= OPIS =

OPIS may refer to:

- Islamabad International Airport, the ICAO code for an airport in Pakistan
- Oil Price Information Service, an agency which provides information on prices of oil related products
- Onboard passenger information system
