= Customer information system =

The term customer information system may refer to:

- a system for managing information about customers in the context of a business's relationship to those customers, often called a customer relationship management system
- a system for providing information to customers of a transport system, often called a passenger information system
