= Onboard passenger information system =

Transport system

Onboard passenger information system (OPIS) is an integrated system for supplying passengers of public transport with information on their current journey through audiovisual information. The systems are installed on-board of public transport vehicles and provide ambient information to passengers both inside and outside of the vehicles. This is in contrast to a station/wayside passenger information system providing information to passengers on the platforms.

== Overview ==
This system provides real-time information to passengers regarding various aspects of their journey, including schedules, station stops, route maps, safety instructions, and emergency procedures. The passenger information system has two modes of conveying information:

- Automatic information – Information (audio/visual) that are triggered automatically by the passenger information system based on the current location, vehicle context, etc.
- Manual information – Information (audio/visual) that are triggered or executed on-demand by on-board crew (e.g., driver, crew) or remote crew (from the operational control center)

== Functions ==
The on-board passenger information system provides relevant information throughout the journey allowing passengers to make informed decisions about their travel plans, including transfers, connections, and arrival times.

PIS also enables the distribution of safety procedures.

The PIS streamlines public transport operations by disseminating information to passengers automatically. By reducing manual announcements and inquiries, the system frees up onboard staff to focus on other tasks.

PIS improves accessibility for passengers with disabilities or special needs by providing multi-channel information delivery, including audio announcements and visual displays, allowing passengers, regardless of their abilities, to access the information they need to navigate the journey independently.

== History ==
In the 20th century, onboard passenger information relied solely on manual announcements by on-board conductors and staff using an analog audio system. Passengers were verbally informed about upcoming stations, arrival times, and other relevant information.

Mechanical display boards such as flip-disc display were used as destination signs. Other static signage, such as stickers, folders, etc., provided visual communication of public transport schedules, vehicle numbers, and other information.

The adoption of LED technology in the latter half of the 20th century modernized onboard communication in public transport. LED displays offered dynamic visual information and were energy-efficient for relaying real-time updates on station stop calling patterns and end destination information. Concurrently with the introduction of LED, digital audio systems began replacing traditional analog audio systems, offering clearer sound quality and the ability to broadcast pre-recorded messages. These systems enhanced accessibility for passengers because of the improved speech intelligibility of said digital audio systems.

The widespread adoption of Global Positioning System (GPS) technology in the 21st century enabled the integration of real-time location tracking into the on-board passenger information system. This allowed onboard systems to determine the train's position and inform passengers about upcoming stations.

The introduction of TFT displays added more visualization to on-board passenger information systems allowing a more graphical representation of the information. It allowed passengers to rely on a wide range of information, including route maps, images, videos, infomercials from the public transport agency, etc.

The proliferation of wireless connectivity, including Wi-Fi and cellular networks, has further enhanced the capabilities of the Passenger Information System. Whereas before the introduction of wireless connectivity, the passenger information system could only rely on local information available on-board of the train, since the introduction of wireless connectivity, passengers can access real-time updates from the passenger information system, improving the overall travel experience.

== Components ==
=== Audio announcement system ===
Broadcasting of audio announcements through the speakers installed on-board of the vehicle. These announcements can be triggered by the automatic information system, providing auditory cues for passengers, including announcements of arrival in the next station, welcome messages, etc. The on-board crew can use specific handsets part of the audio announcement system to provide public address announcements to the passengers on top of the automatic information. Minimally consists of an amplifier, speakers, handsets (to perform public address).

=== Audio intercom system ===
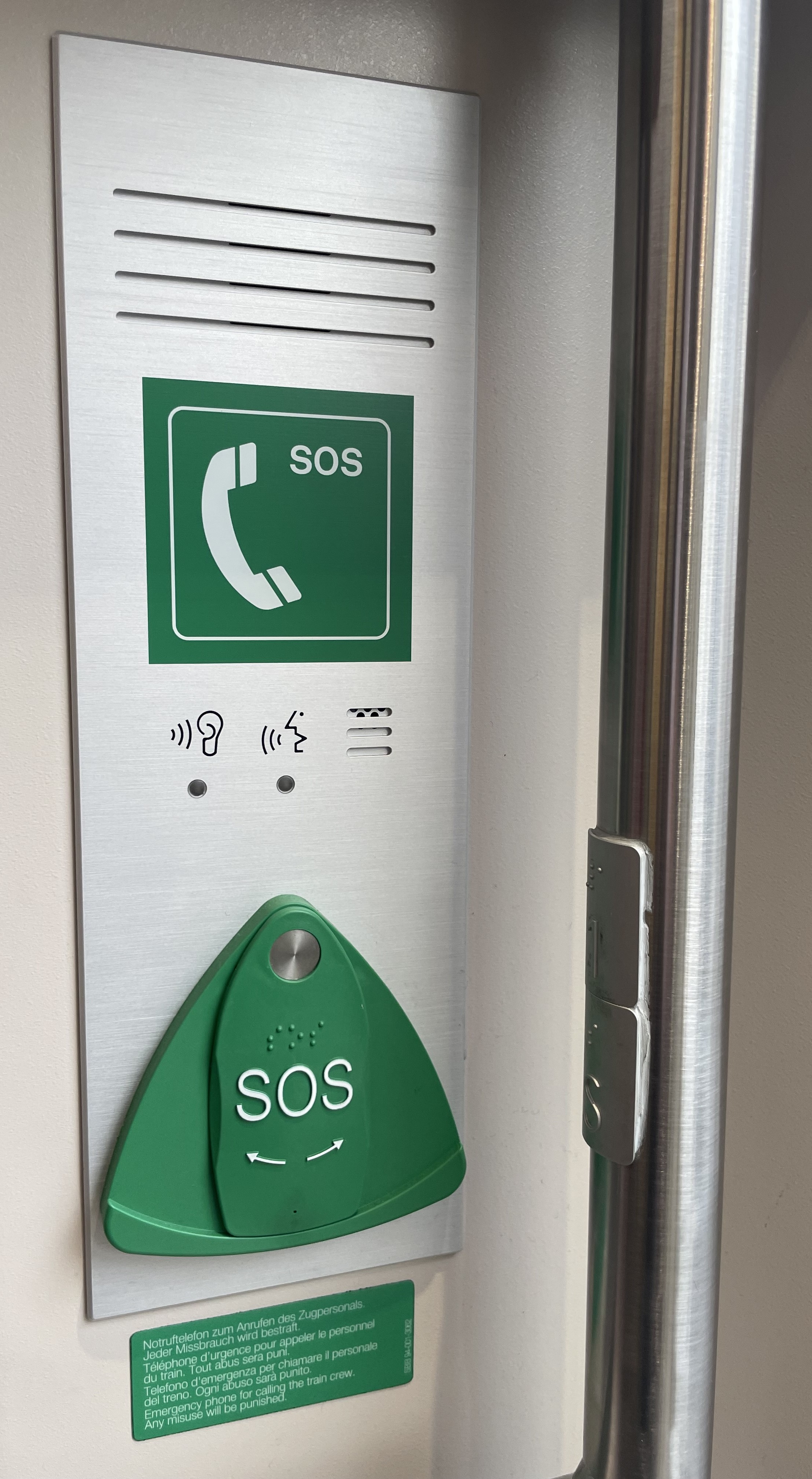
Emgergency call unit typically used in Switzerland

Audio intercom system provides communication between the passengers and on-board staff. This allows for bidirectional communication between the on-board crew members (crew intercom) and the on-board crew members and passengers (passenger intercom). Minimally consists out of a handset (for crew interaction) and passenger communication units (for passenger interaction).

=== LED displays ===
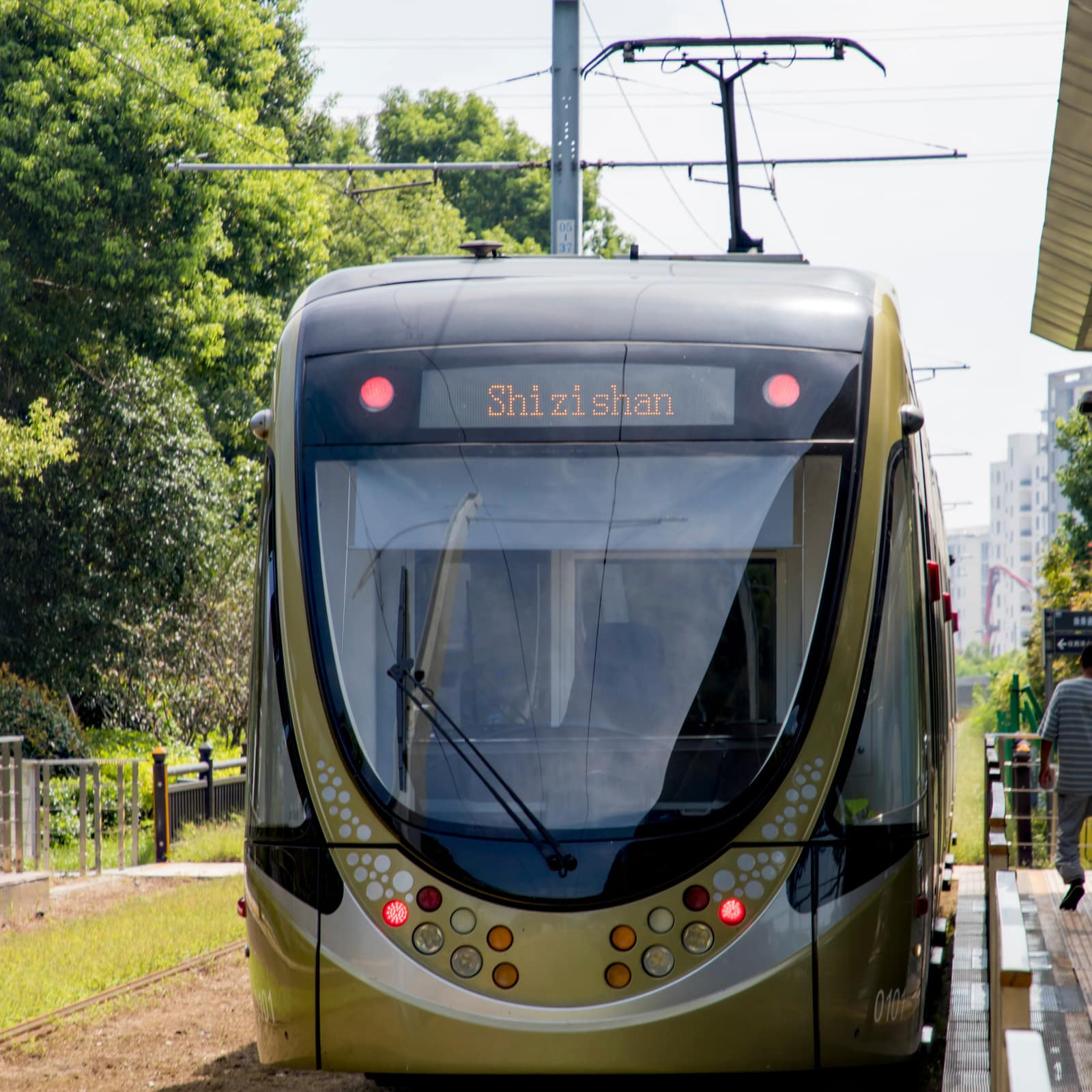
Traditional LED Front Display for railways

Digital display screens inside the vehicle (to address passengers on-board) or outside the vehicle (to address passengers on the platform) displaying mainly textual information to passengers. They typically provide information on upcoming stations, end station, route number of the vehicle, etc. Compared to TFT displays, LED displays are better suited for use on the outside of the vehicle thanks to better contrast, higher readability with direct sunlight, etc.

=== TFT/LCD displays ===
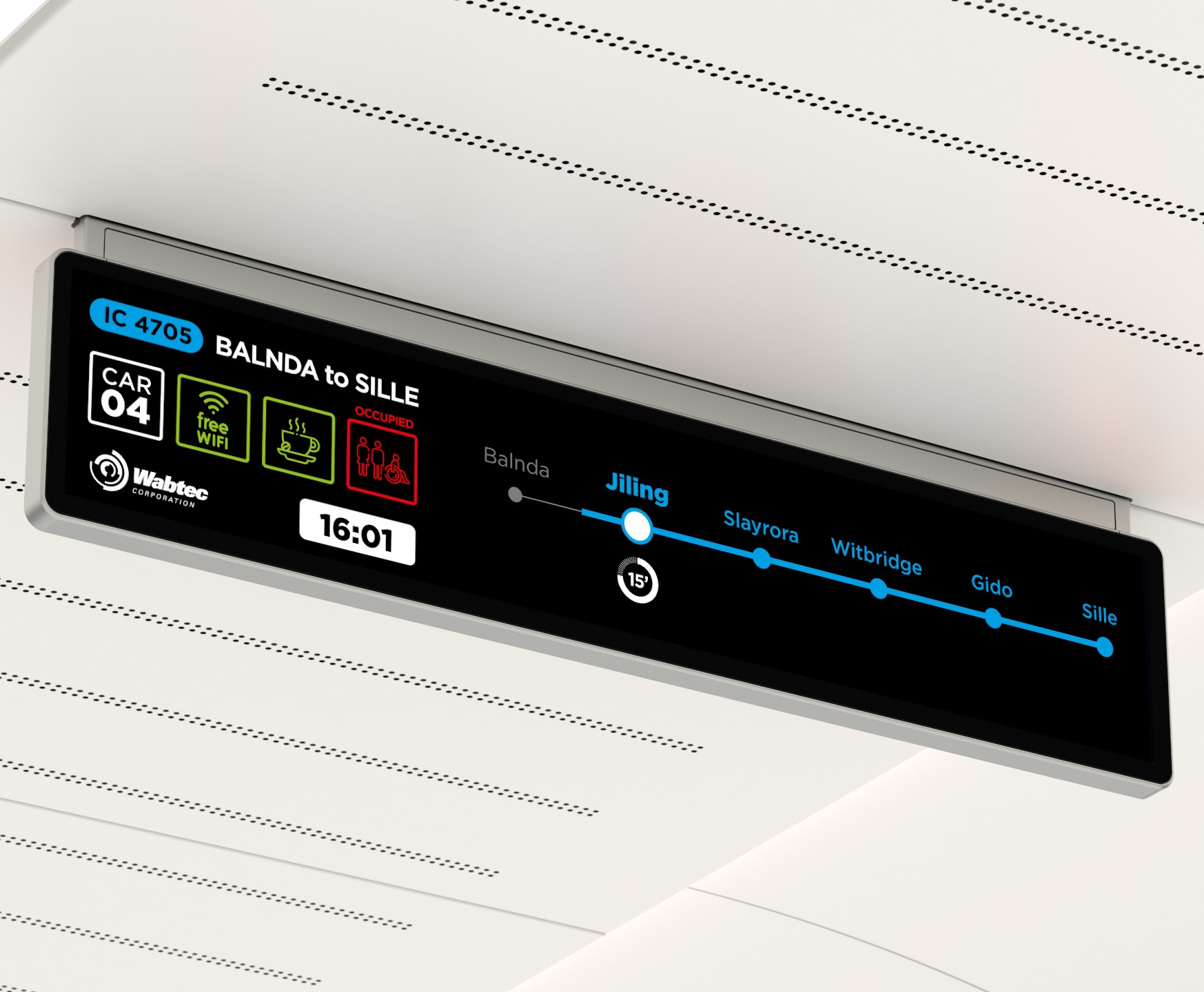
Modern and elegant iSmart doble sided ceiling TFT display

Digital display screens inside the vehicle displaying textual and graphical information to passengers. They typically provide information on the current journey information (upcoming stations, arrival times, dynamic route maps, etc.) as well as infotainment information (advertisements, instruction videos, etc.)

=== Interactive touch screens ===
Installed in select (often locked) compartments of the vehicle and used by the driver/crew to control the Passenger Information System. Typical functionalities include starting the automatic announcements by entering a trip code, launching an ad-hoc pre-recorded announcement, consulting the current status of the PIS system, etc.

=== Controller ===
The central controller contains a software application that is responsible for driving the automatic information distribution across the different components of the onboard passenger information system.

=== Management software ===
Software application that runs off-board (often a Cloud-hosted solution) and that allows public transport operators to manage the PIS system in terms of configuration (e.g., changes to the PIS behavior), operational management (e.g., launching an ad-hoc announcement from the OCC and handle interactions with 3rd party systems (e.g., ITS for exchange of real-time information).

== Characteristics ==
Audio

- multi-branch to allow targeted announcements in different compartments of the vehicle (e.g., vestibule, passenger seating area, etc.)
- automatic volume control based on ambient noise in the vehicle

LED

- high-resolution, multi-color displays - possibility to display more than text

TFT

- graphical visualization of information, dynamic line maps, geographical maps, etc.

Controller software

- multilingual information distribution
- real-time information from different sources

== Interactions with other systems ==
- TCMS/TCN – The Train Control & Management System is an on-board control system present on railway vehicles that has a central role in coordinating control and monitoring across disparate on-board systems. Typical interfaces between Passenger information systems and the TCMS are wheel-pulse information (for tracking purposes), GPS location, door status information, central time server, toilet status, etc.
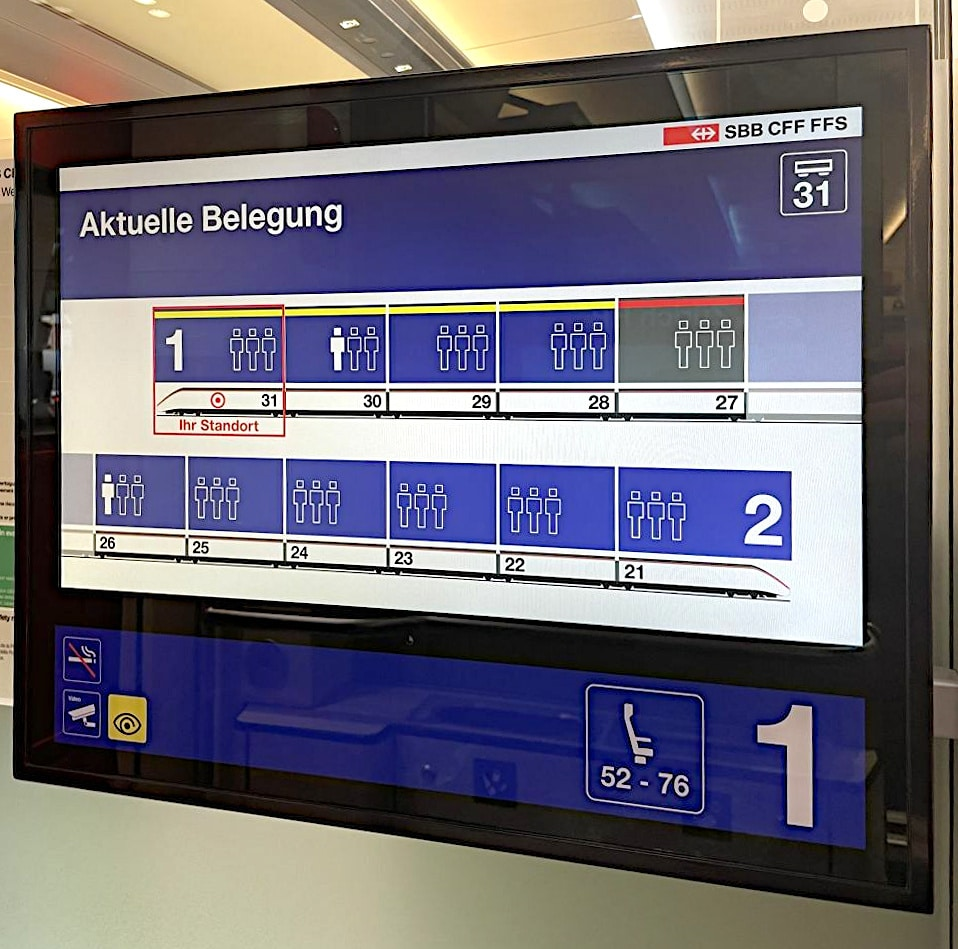
- TFT display showing passenger occupation in a Swiss Giruno train from Stadler
  APC – automated passenger counting systems are often integrated with the passenger information system to allow guiding passengers to the carriages with the least passengers present.
- ITS/ITCS – the PIS systems often interface with ITS systems to retrieve real-time information regarding the current service (e.g., estimated arrival/departure times), connecting services (e.g., departure times/platforms of multi-modal services in the next station), service alerts (e.g., announcements regarding current and/or future disruptions).
- CCTV – interfacing between the PIS system and on-board CCTV systems takes place to report events from the PIS system (e.g., passenger emergency call & location) to the CCTV system, visualization of CCTV streams on the PIS TFT displays, integration of the PIS HMI with the CCTV control functionalities, etc.

== Challenges ==
Passenger Information Systems in public transport have some inherent challenges linked to the different life cycles of the systems (mechanical – electronic – software) in place. Regarding the mechanical vehicle bodies, there are examples of trains that have a lifetime of 30+ years, while the typical lifetime of hardware/electronic systems is between 5–10 years. The expectations of passengers and public transit agencies in terms of the functionalities of the Passenger information systems are evolving on a much higher pace, which can only be realized by tackling them in software. One of the primary challenges in on-board passenger information systems is synchronizing the disparate lifecycles of mechanical, electronic and software components. Coordinating maintenance schedules and upgrade cycles across these domains is essential to prevent disruptions.
