= Annax =

German manufacturer of railway information systems

ANNAX is a German manufacturer of passenger information systems (PIS) for the railway industry. It was founded on 1 January 1996 as a divestment by Robert Bosch GmbH. In 2007, ANNAX took over the traffic business unit of Ascom in Switzerland. In 2018 Wabtec Corporation has acquired ANNAX Group.

== Overview ==
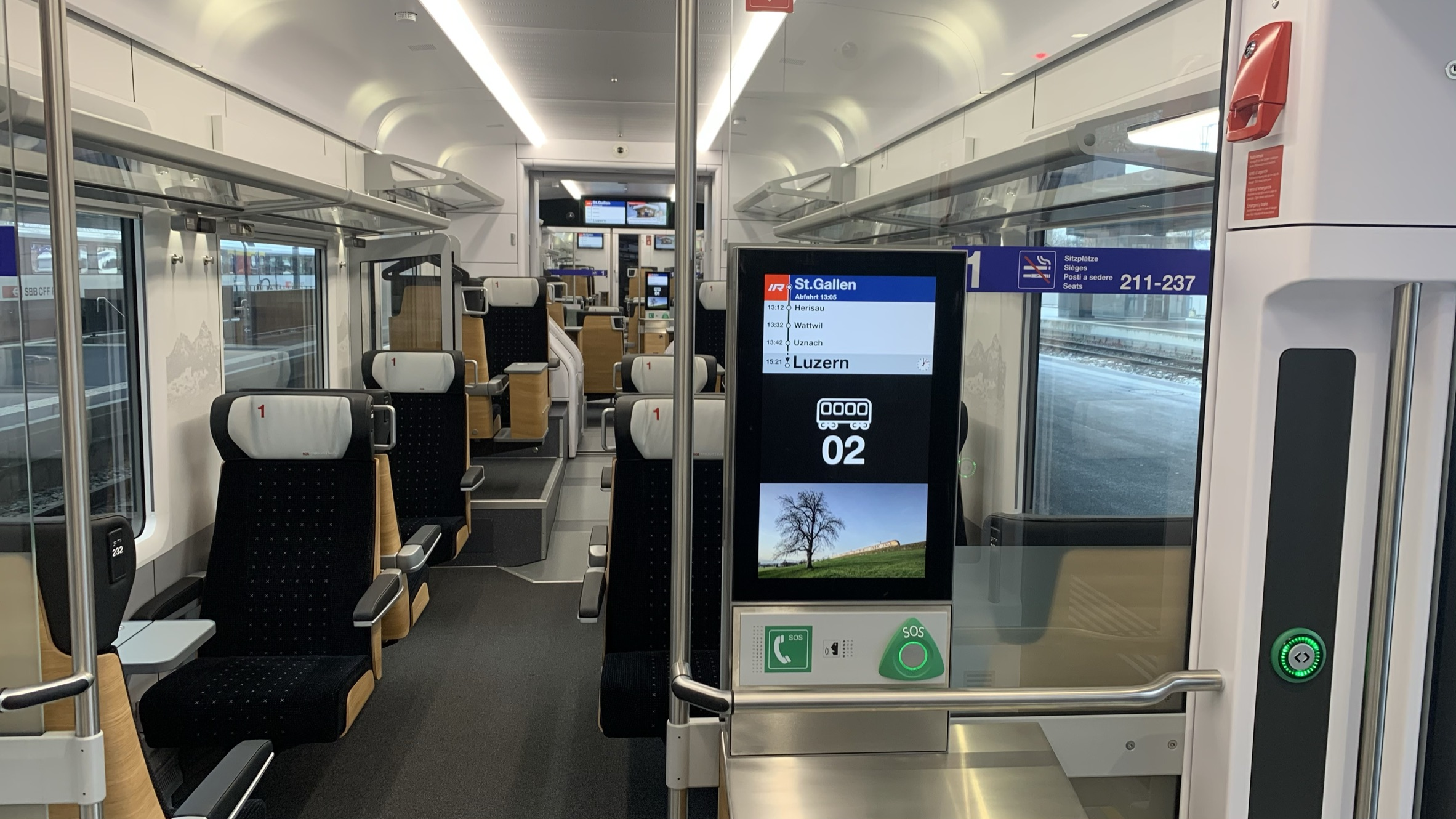
Implemented ANNAX Passenger Information System

Originally, ANNAX was a pure product company, mainly producing displays for various sectors such as sports, industry and railways. Today its focus is on the railway sector. Its product portfolio ranges from LED displays, TFT displays, infotainment displays, audio amplifiers, emergency intercoms, Cab audio control units, WiFi on board, seat reservation systems, passenger counting to video surveillance solutions (CCTV).

ANNAX is a provider of complete passenger information systems (PIS) for visual and auditive announcements and also video security inside all types of trains such as street cars, metros, commuter trains, regional trains, intercity trains as well as for the latest high-speed trains.

It has manufacturing sites in Germany, China and Switzerland.
