= Kintetsu 21020 series =

Japanese electric multiple unit train type

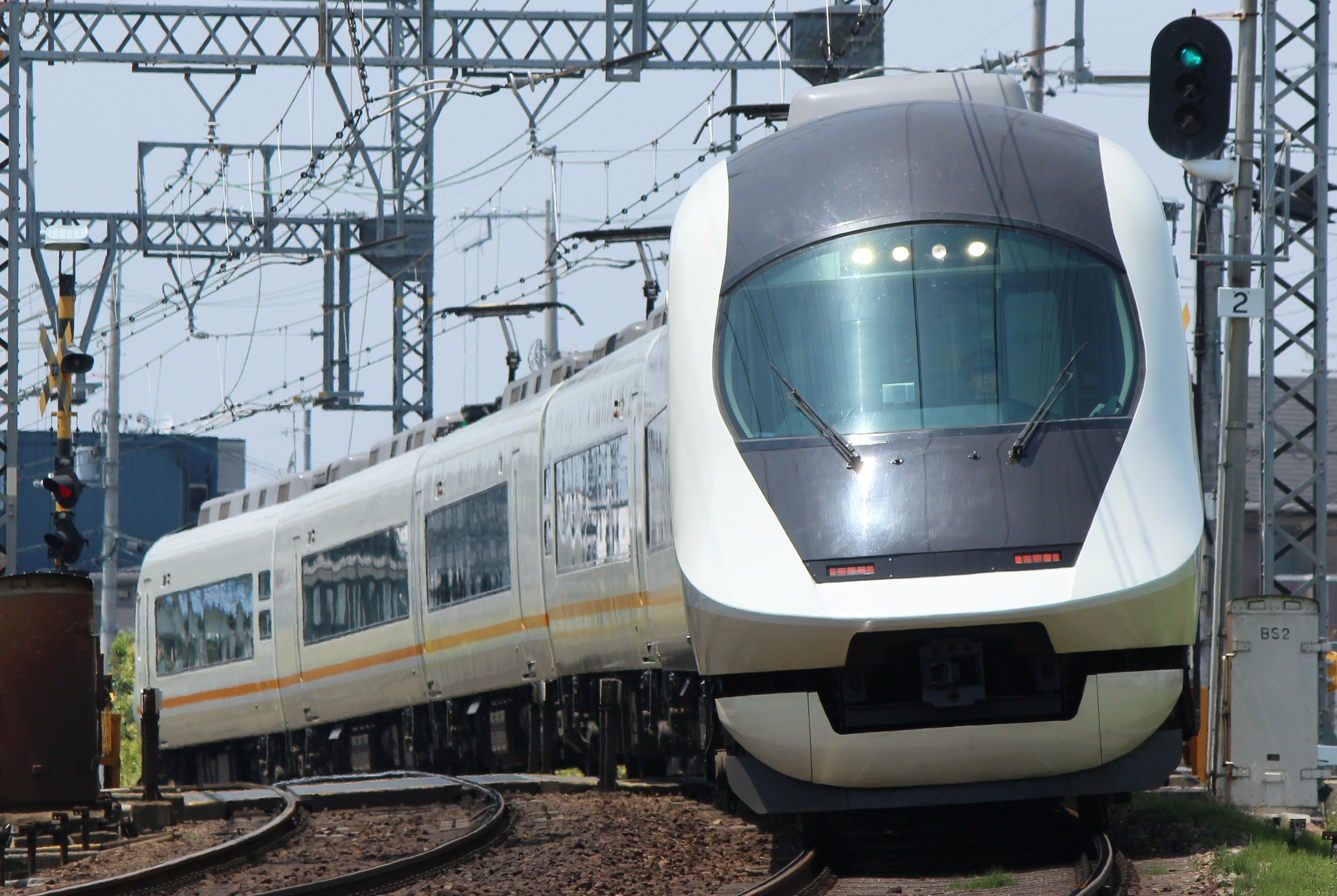
- A 21020 series set in May 2013
- Manufacturer: Kinki Sharyo
- Number built: 12 vehicles (2 sets)
- Number in service: 12 vehicles (2 sets)
- Formation: 6 cars per trainset
- Operators: Kintetsu Railway
- Lines served: Nara Line; Nagoya Line

Specifications
- Electric system(s): 1,500 V DC (overhead wire)
- Current collector(s): Pantograph
- Track gauge: 1,435 mm (4 ft 8 1/2 in)

The Kintetsu 21020 series (Japanese: 近鉄21020系電車), nicknamed Urban Liner Next, is a limited express train of the Kintetsu Railway. the urban liner next runs from Osaka-Namba to Kintetsu Nagoya station the train type received the Good Design Award and the Blue Ribbon Award in 2003.

== Formation ==
Sets are formed as follows:

| Designation | Tc | M | M | T | M | Tc |
| Numbering | 21120 | 21220 | 21320 | 21420 | 21520 | 21620 |

== Design ==
All seats are transverse.

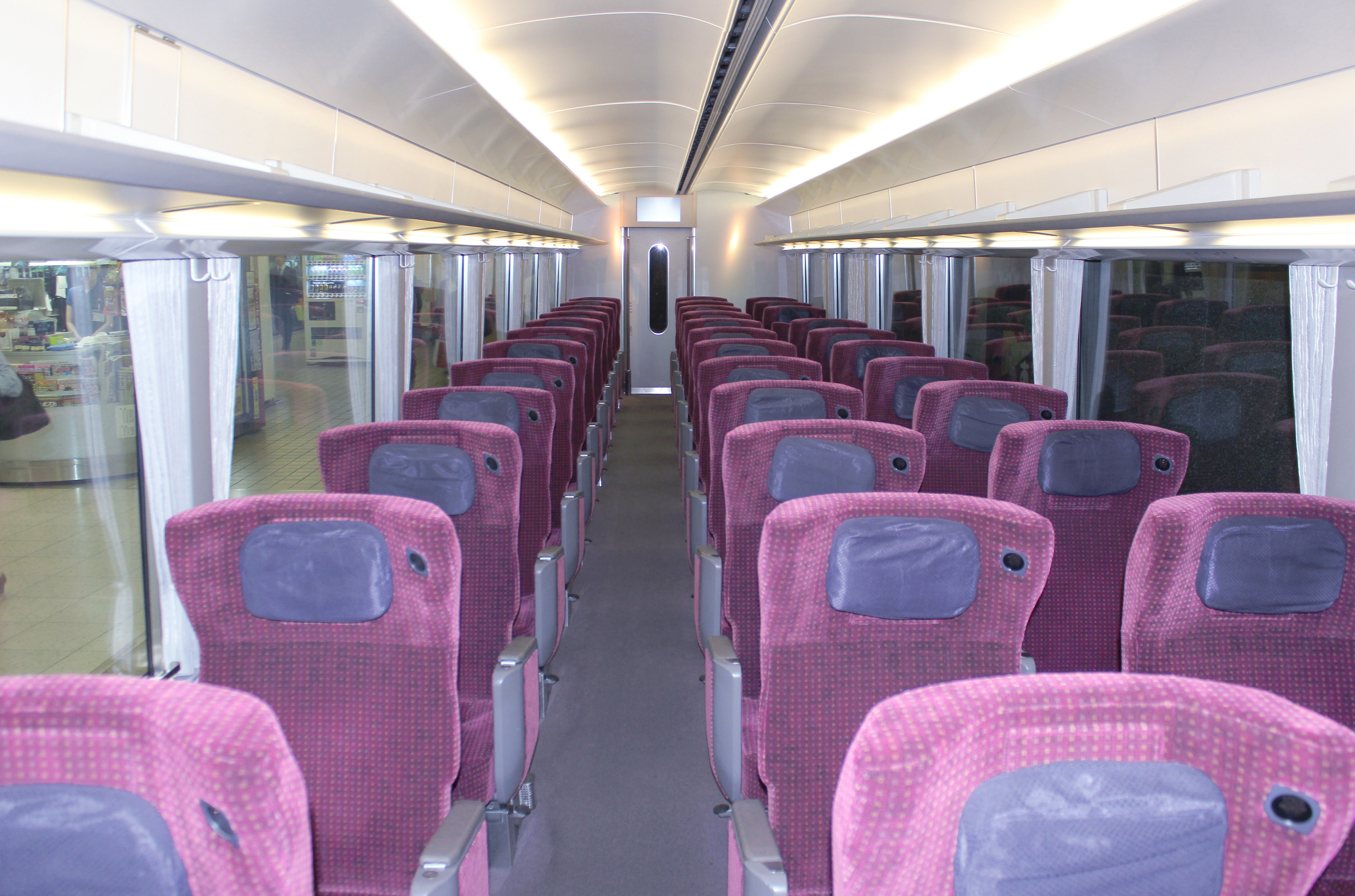
"Deluxe" seating in 2013

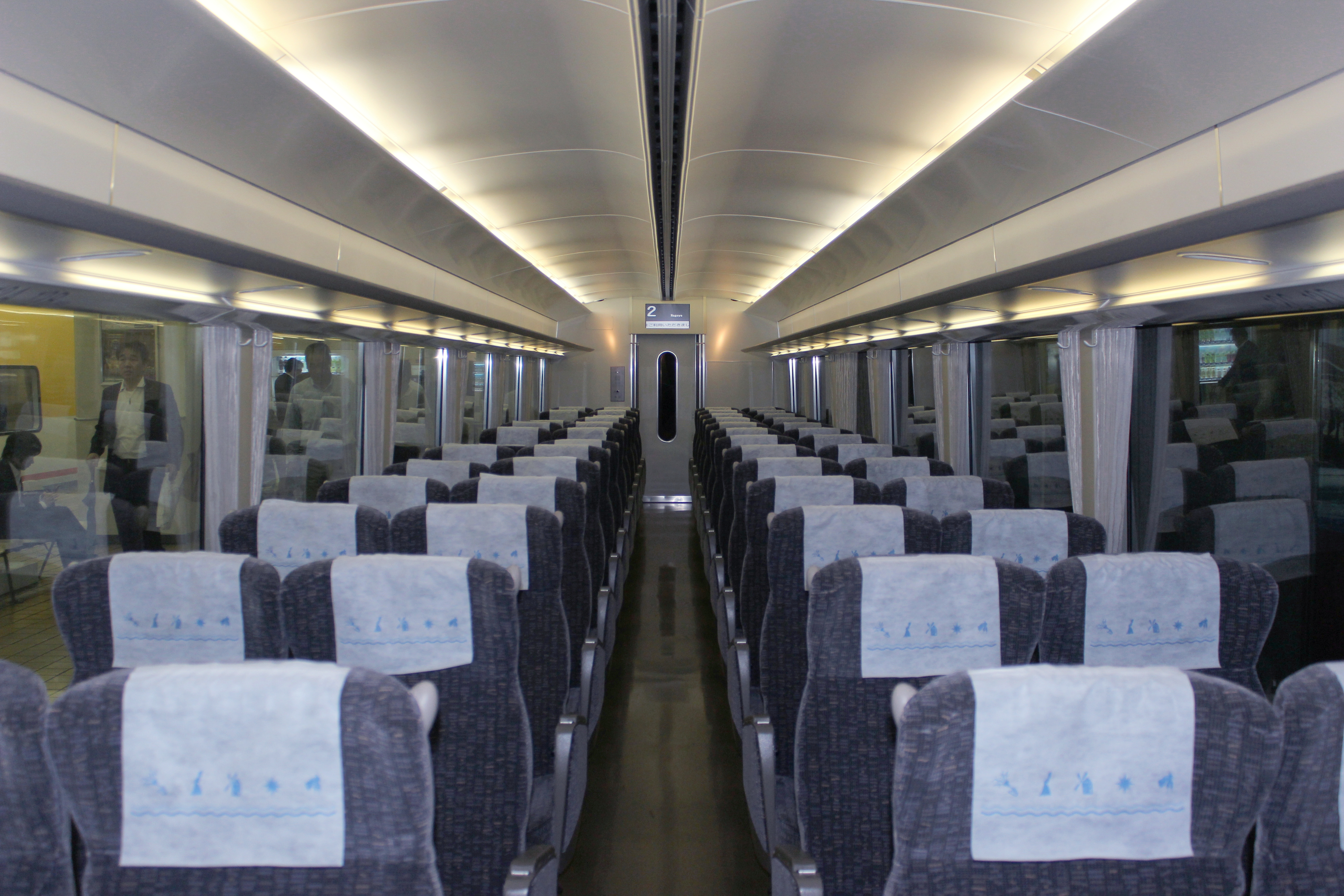
Regular seating in 2013

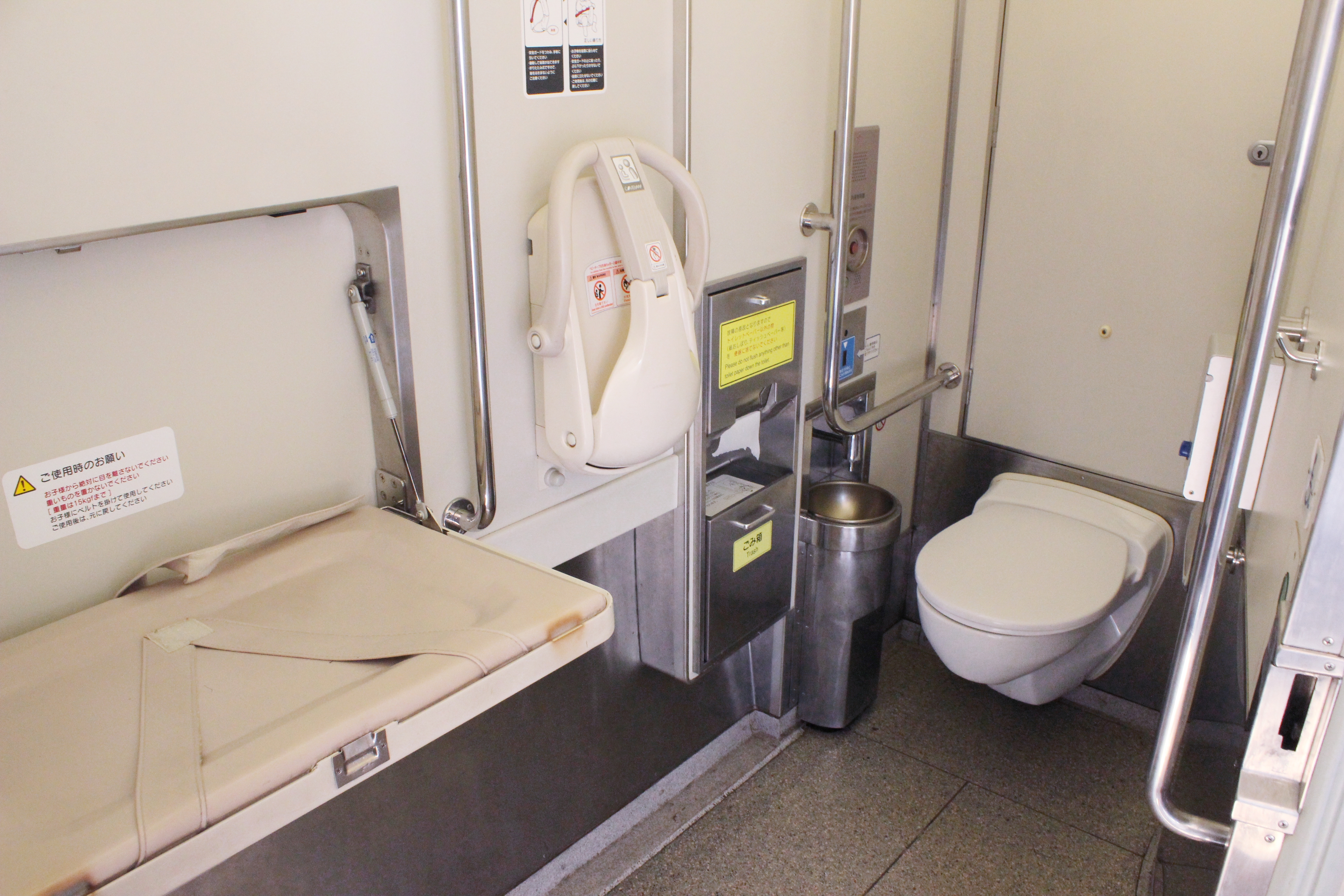
Universal access toilet

== History ==
The Kintetsu 21020 series began service in 2003.
