= Passenger information system =

Public transport information delivery method

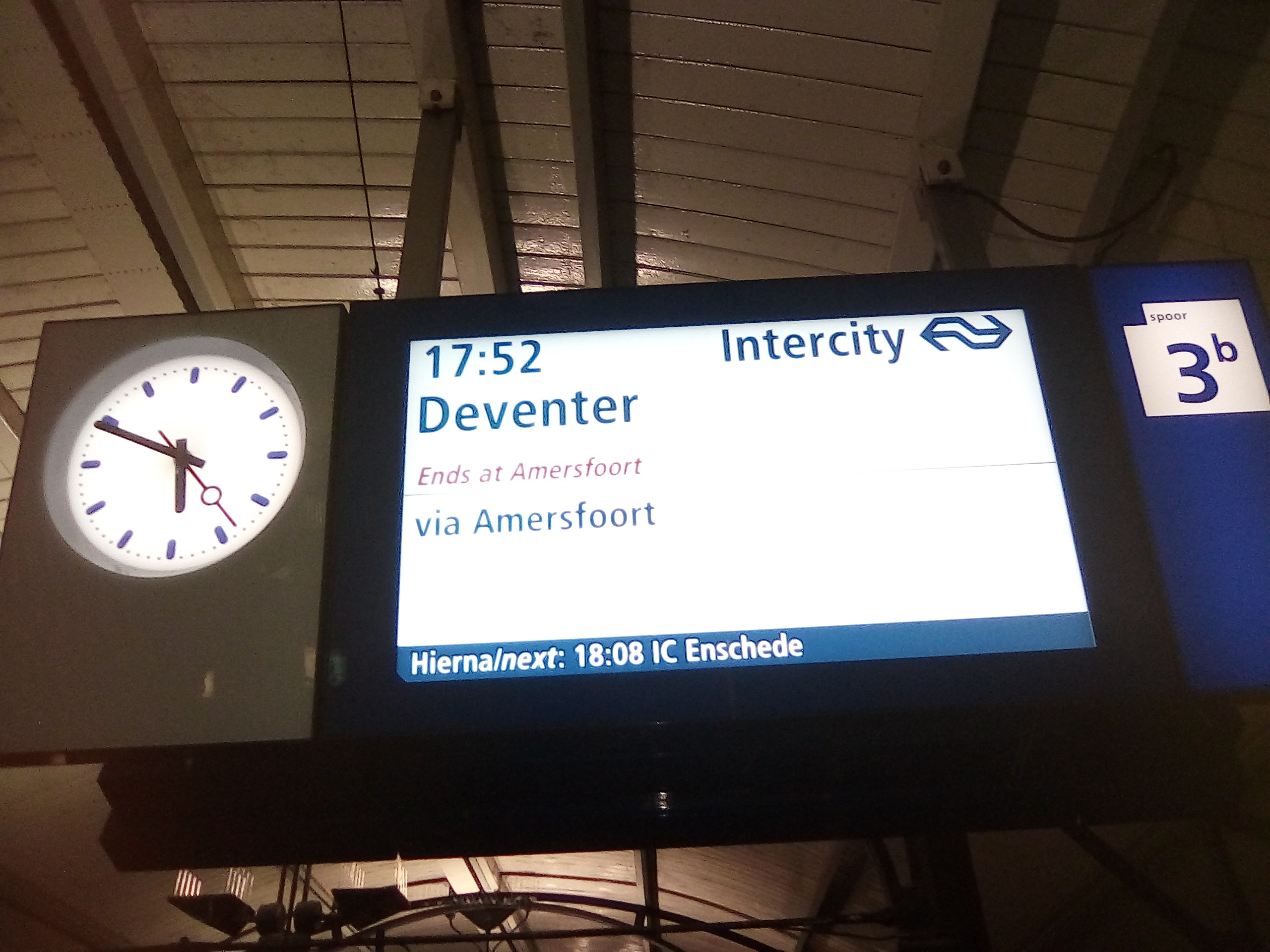
Central Train Indicator at Hilversum railway station announcing the Intercity towards Deventer; probably because of a disruption, it today ends at Amersfoort.

A passenger information system (PIS), passenger information display system (PIDS) or passenger information display (PID), is an automated system for supplying users of public transport with information about the nature and the state of a public transport service through visual, voice or other media. It is also known as a customer information system or an operational information system, often integrated with fleet management systems. Among the information provided by such systems, a distinction can be drawn between:

- Static or schedule information, which changes only occasionally and is typically used for journey planning prior to departure.
- Real-time information, derived from automatic vehicle location (AVL) systems or vehicle tracking system and changes continuously as a result of real-world events, which is typically used during the course of a journey (primarily how close the service is running to time and when it is due at a stop, as well as incidents that affect service operations, platform changes, etc.).

Static information has traditionally been made available in printed form though route network maps and timetable booklets at transit stations. However, most transit operators now also use integrated passenger information systems that provide either schedule-based information through a journey planner application or schedule-based information in combination with real-time information.

Real-time information is an advance on schedule-only information, which recognises the fact that public transport services do not always operate exactly according to the published timetable. By providing real-time information to travellers, they are better able to conduct their journey confidently, including taking any necessary steps in the event of delays. That helps to encourage greater use of public transport, which for many countries is a political goal.

Real-time information is provided to passengers in a number of different ways, including mobile phone applications, platform-level signage, and automated public address systems. It may include both predictions about arrival and departure times, as well as information on the nature and the cause of disruptions.

== Issues with passenger information provision ==
There are four principal considerations for the provision of passenger information (static or real time):

- Data availability. Information can be provided only if it is available, and collecting information (often via telematics systems using a GPS tracking unit) can be resource-intensive. Also, there may be difficulties with co-ordinating data sharing between multiple organisations.
- Data accuracy. Collecting information is error-prone. Also, prediction algorithms are not perfect and so real-time announcements may be in error.
- Getting information to the passenger. A variety of dissemination mechanisms may be used, but it is not always easy to ensure that the correct information reaches the passenger when it is most needed. Information overload must be avoided.
- Latency or response time. Information provision must react quickly to a passenger request or a real-world update. There is little point in announcing a service three minutes after it has departed.

== Real-time arrival prediction systems ==
Bilingual real-time information is provided on every platform in the MTR passenger railway system in Hong Kong.

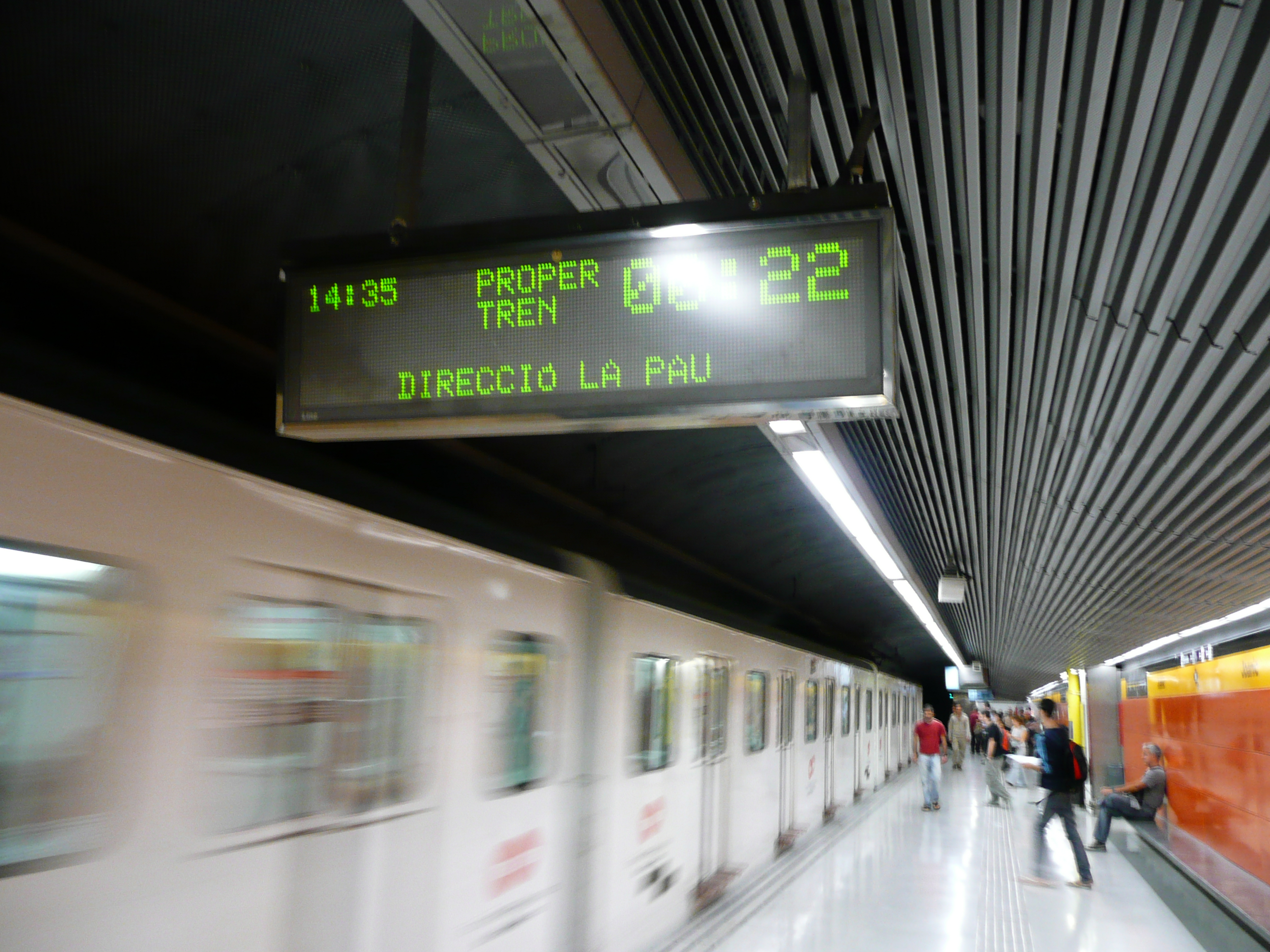
LED information display at Joanic station on the Barcelona Metro. The LED displays count down to the last second the time needed for a train to arrive at a station.

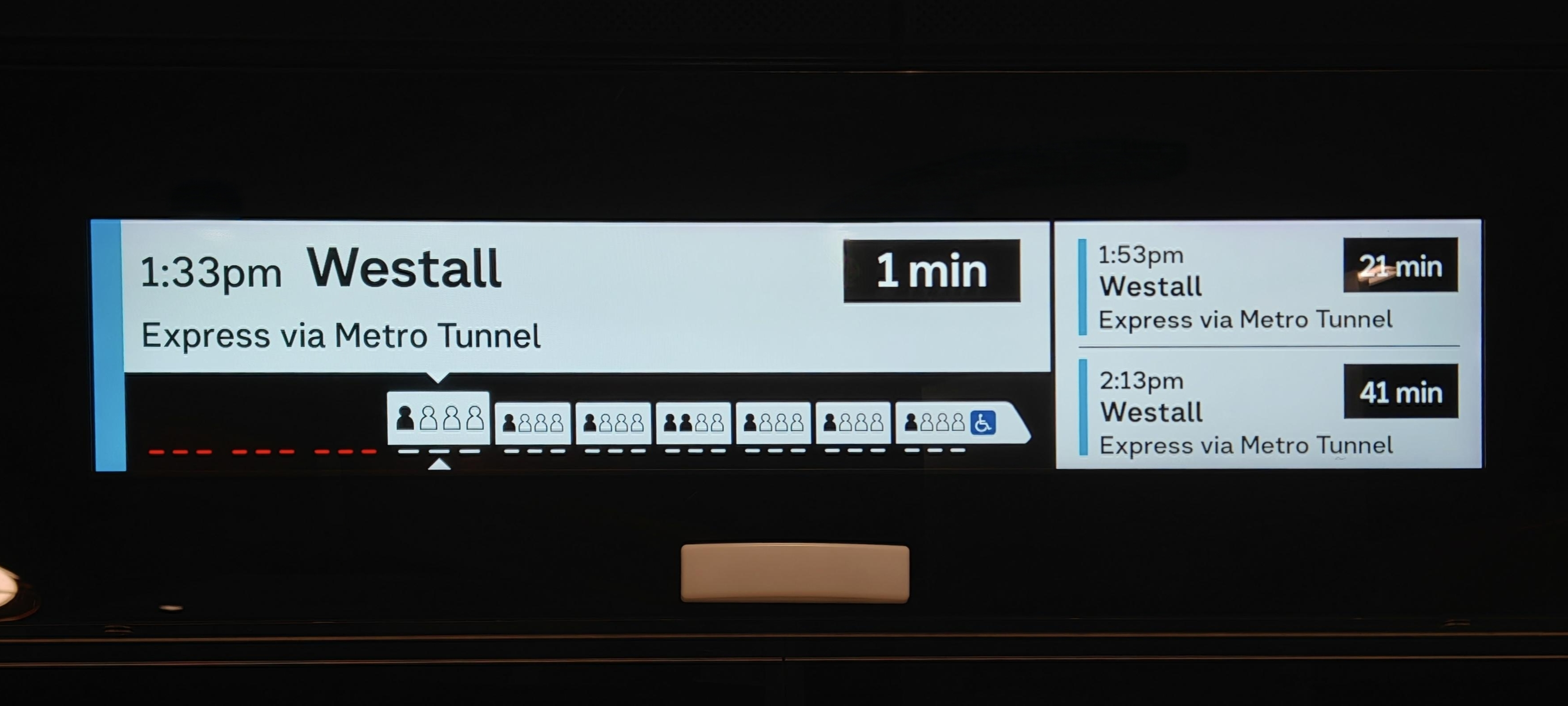
Platform Screen Door PID, Parkville Station, Melbourne

Current operational information on service running is collected from automatic vehicle location (AVL) systems and from control systems, including incident capture systems. The information can be compared algorithmically with the published service timetable to generate a prediction of how services will run in the next few minutes to hours. That may be informed by additional information. For instance, bus services are affected by congestion on the road network, and all services may be affected by adverse weather conditions.

=== Economic rationale ===
The capital and revenue costs for traveller information systems can be calculated with reasonable accuracy. However, the derivation of tangible financial benefits is far more difficult to establish and as so there is very little research. That directs the business model for information systems towards the "softer" merits such as traveller confidence. There must be an actual value, as individuals are willing to pay for systems that give them access to real-time data relating to their journey. The difficulty is establishing what that is for each individual person and perhaps each individual piece of roadside hardware. Even less is known about the long-term effects of access to these types of services. The only long-term study is from 2012.

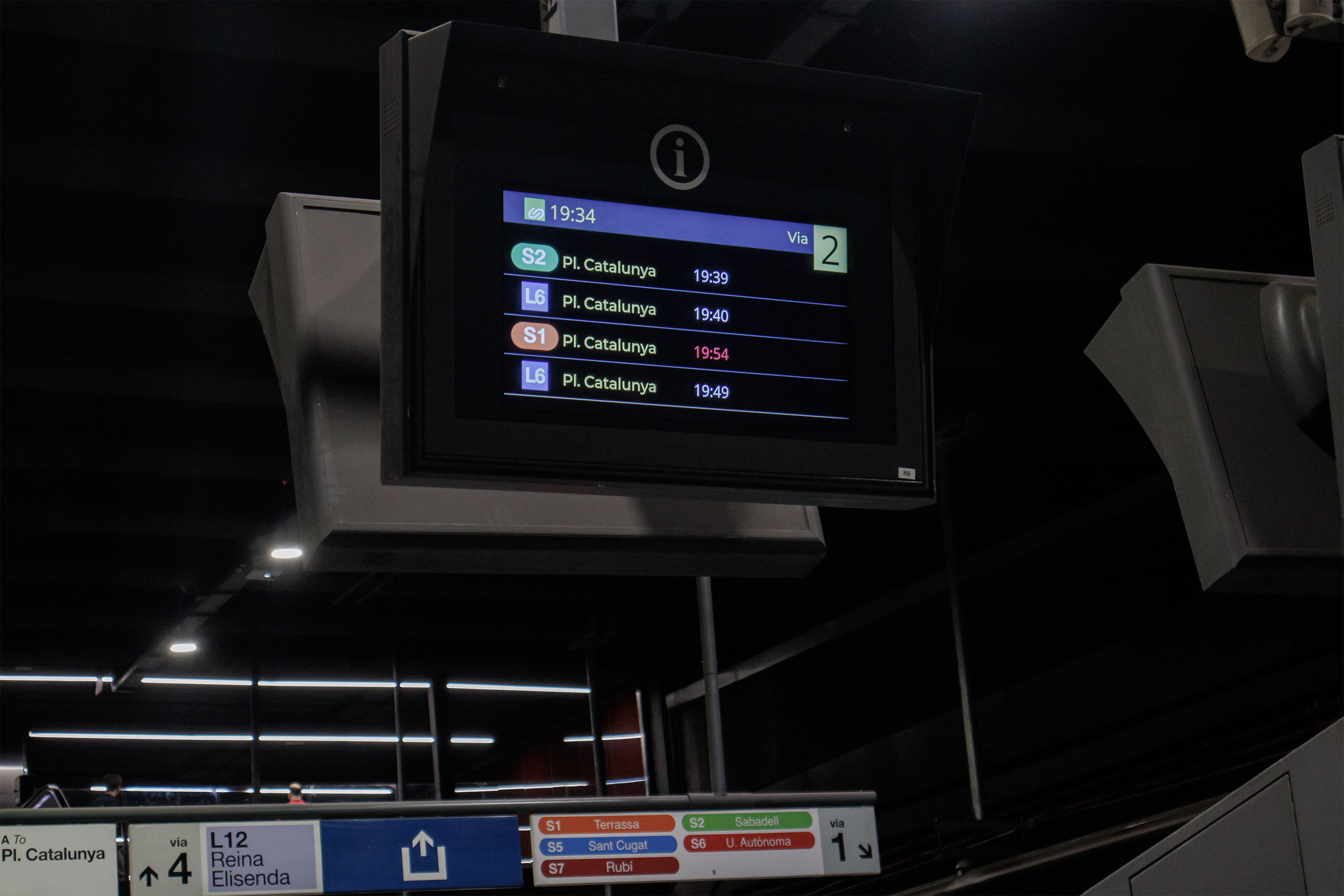
Information screen taken from the ceiling announcing delays on FGC line S1 at Sarrià station, Barcelona

=== Communication channels ===
Information may be delivered via any electronic media, including:

- Mobile phone application
- LED displays and screens inside stations
- E-paper displays and screens at bus stops and shelters
- Internet through a website
- Telephone (either a staffed bureau service or an automated answering system)
- Touch screen kiosks for self-service (e.g. in customer offices)

Additional considerations include:

- How the system presents information for disabled travellers
- Whether the system provides information in multiple languages

=== Information ===
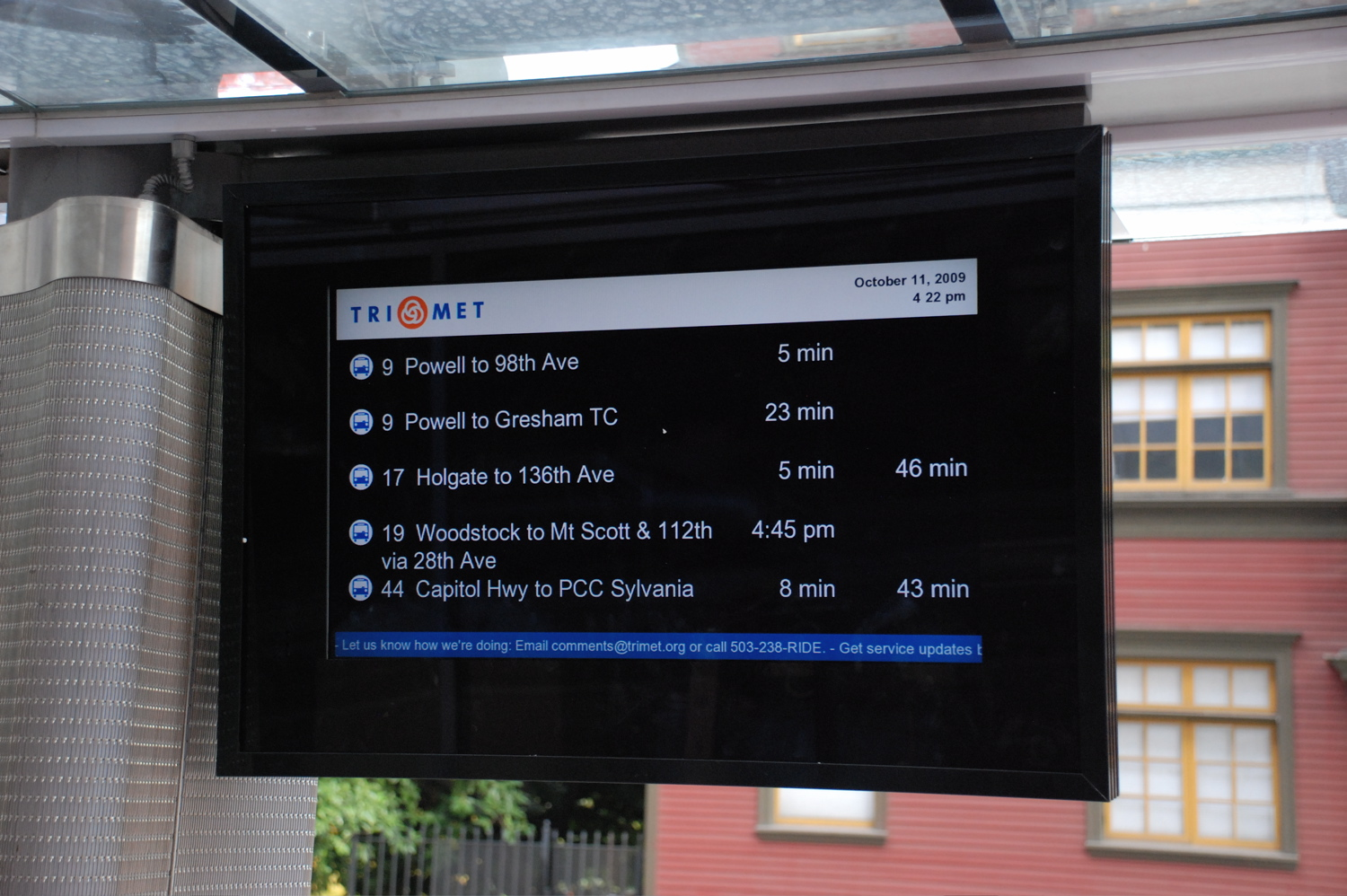
Information display in a shelter at a TriMet bus stop in downtown Portland, Oregon

The information provided by a passenger information system depends on its location and the technical scope (e.g. the size of the display screen)

At a station or stop, it is normal to provide up-to-date predictions of:

- Which service is operated by the next vehicle to arrive, including its route and destination. For train services in Europe, the train type is typically also indicated
- When the vehicle will arrive.
- How closely it is running to timetable.
- Similar information for the following few services.
- General advice on current travel disruptions that may be useful to the passenger in understanding the implications for their travel plans.

On a vehicle, it is normal to provide up to date predictions of:

- When the vehicle will arrive at the next station or stop (express or long-distance services).
- Advice on connecting services.

Personalised channels (web, mobile device, or kiosk) is normally set up to mimic the view from a station or stop, but they may in addition be linked to journey planners. Using such systems, a passenger may (re)plan their journey to take into account current circumstances (such as cancelled services or excessive delays).

== Examples ==
=== France ===
In Paris, France, SIEL indicator systems (abbreviated from Système d’information en ligne) are installed in the RER, the Paris Métro and on 250 bus routes on the RATP bus system.

On the RER, two types of indicators are used. The first-generation model indicates only the termini of trains stopping at a station through the use of square lights beside the words bearing the name of a terminus. The second-generation model includes an LED display above the square lights indicating the terminus and train service. The displays are used only on the RER line A, RER line B and at Gare de Châtelet – Les Halles station on RER line D. They can be inaccurate at times because of the lack of communication between SNCF and RATP, the two operators of the RER.

On the Paris Métro, there are two types of information display systems. The LED numerical display installed in all Métro lines (except line 14) has been in use since 1997. The television display is installed on all stations on line 14. The displays show the time needed for a train (and the subsequent train after it) to reach a particular station.

On the bus network in Paris, monochrome LCDs have been used since 1996 to indicate the time needed for a bus on a bus route to arrive at a bus stop, after a two-year trial period on a few bus routes.

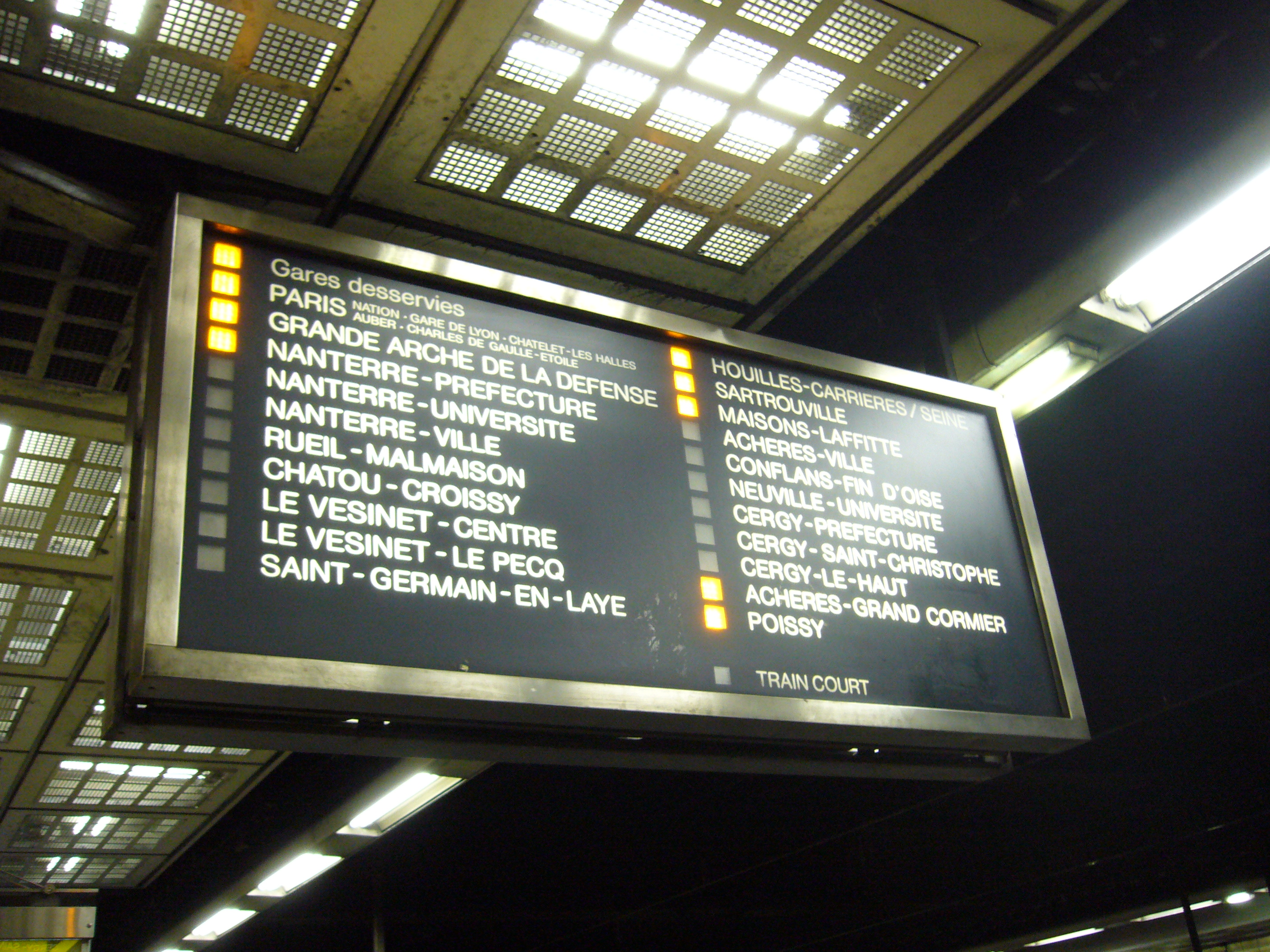
1st generation termini indicator on the RER line A

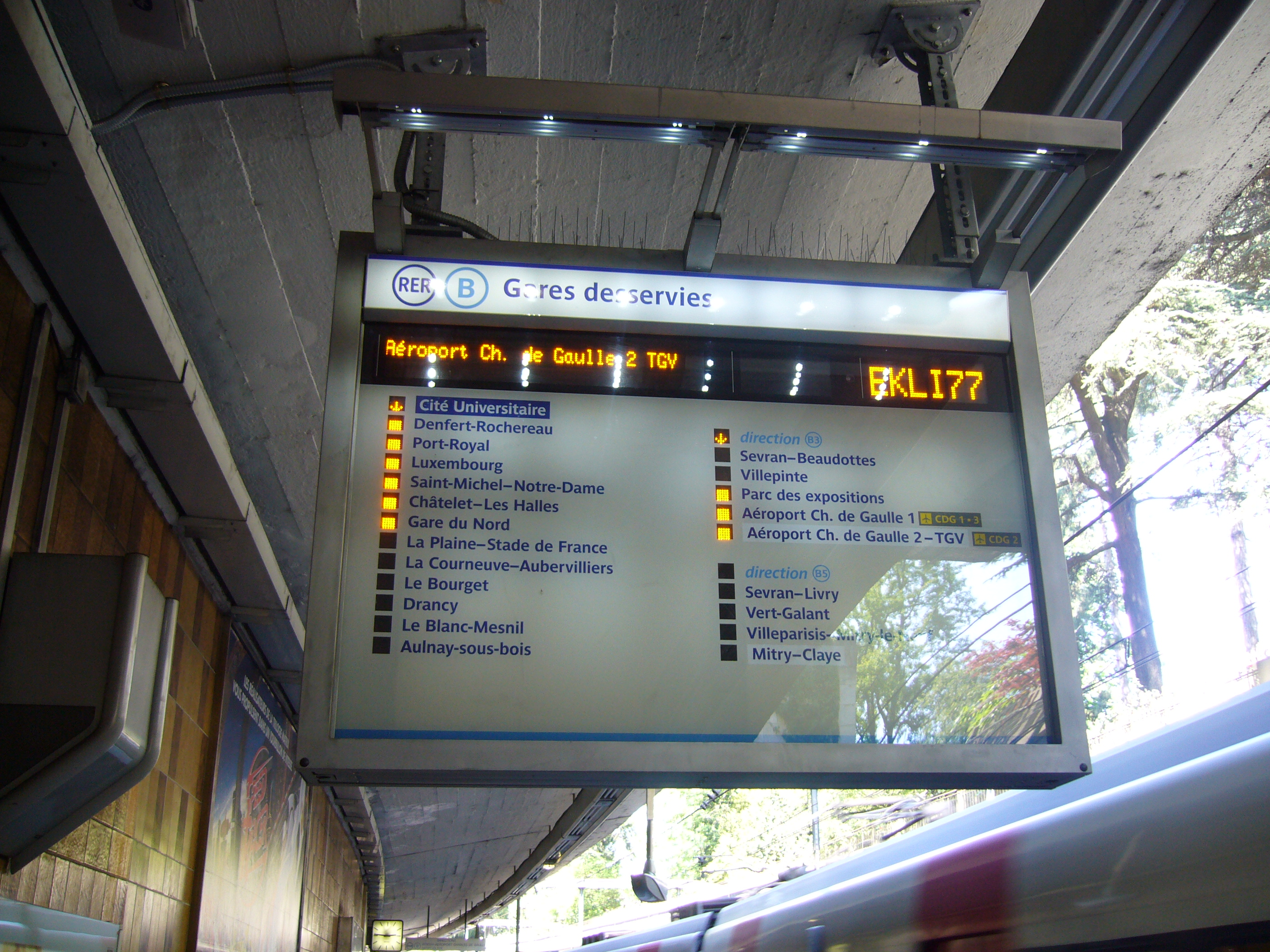
2nd generation termini indicator on the RER line B

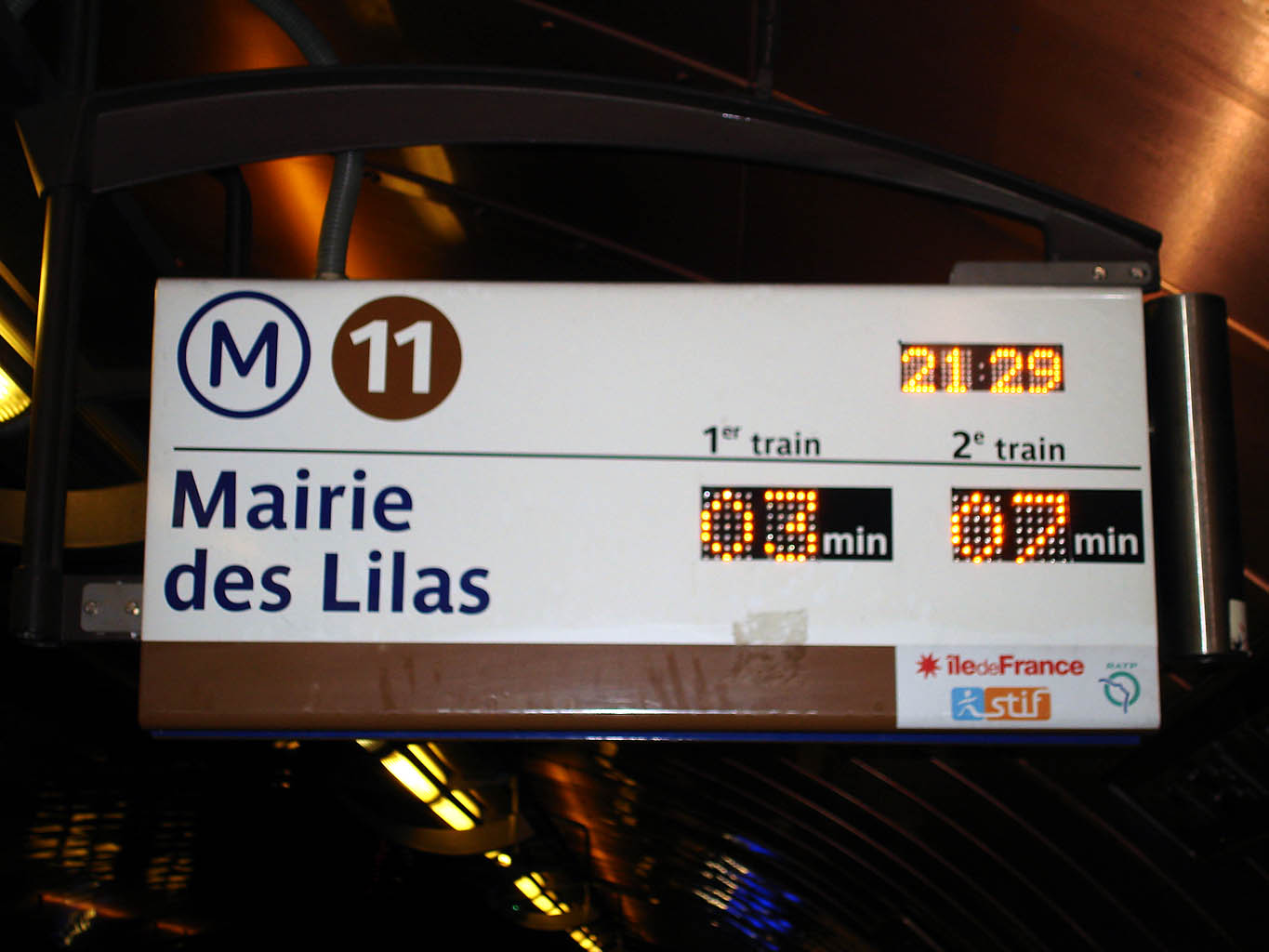
LED indicator on the Paris Métro

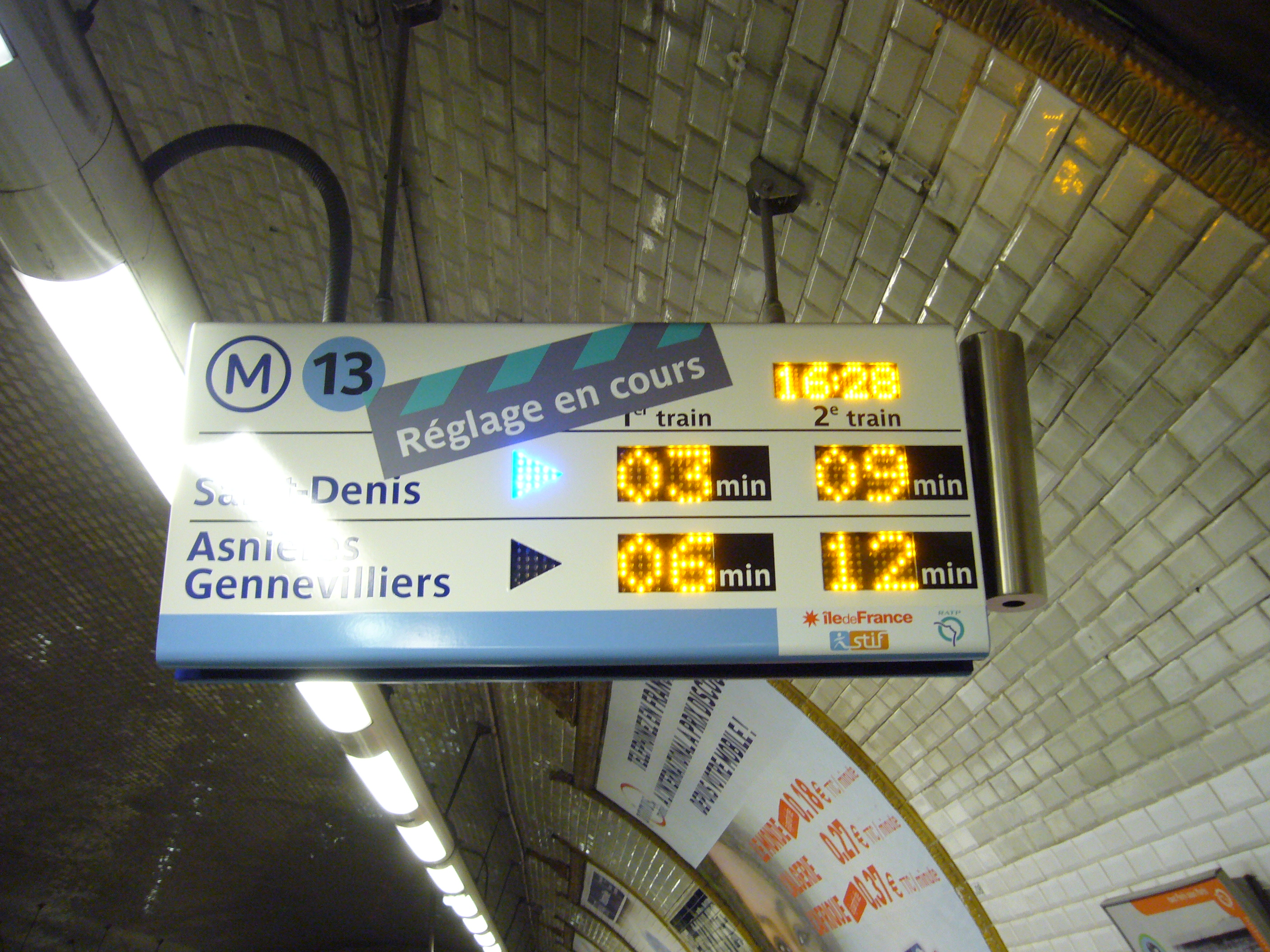
A variant of the Métro's LED indicator used on Paris Métro Line 13 utilizing a lighted arrow indicating the terminus of the next train

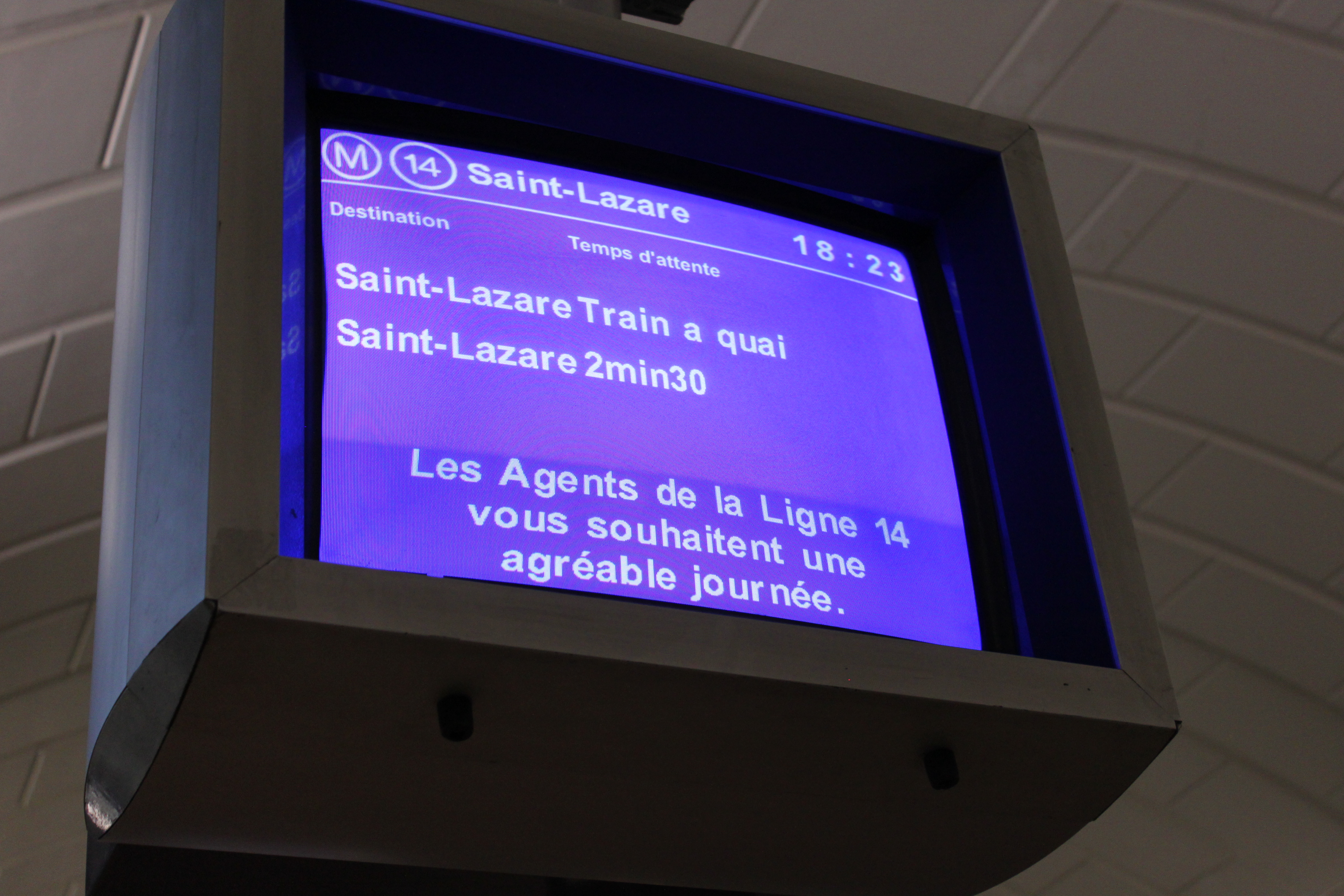
TV screen previously used on Paris Métro Line 14

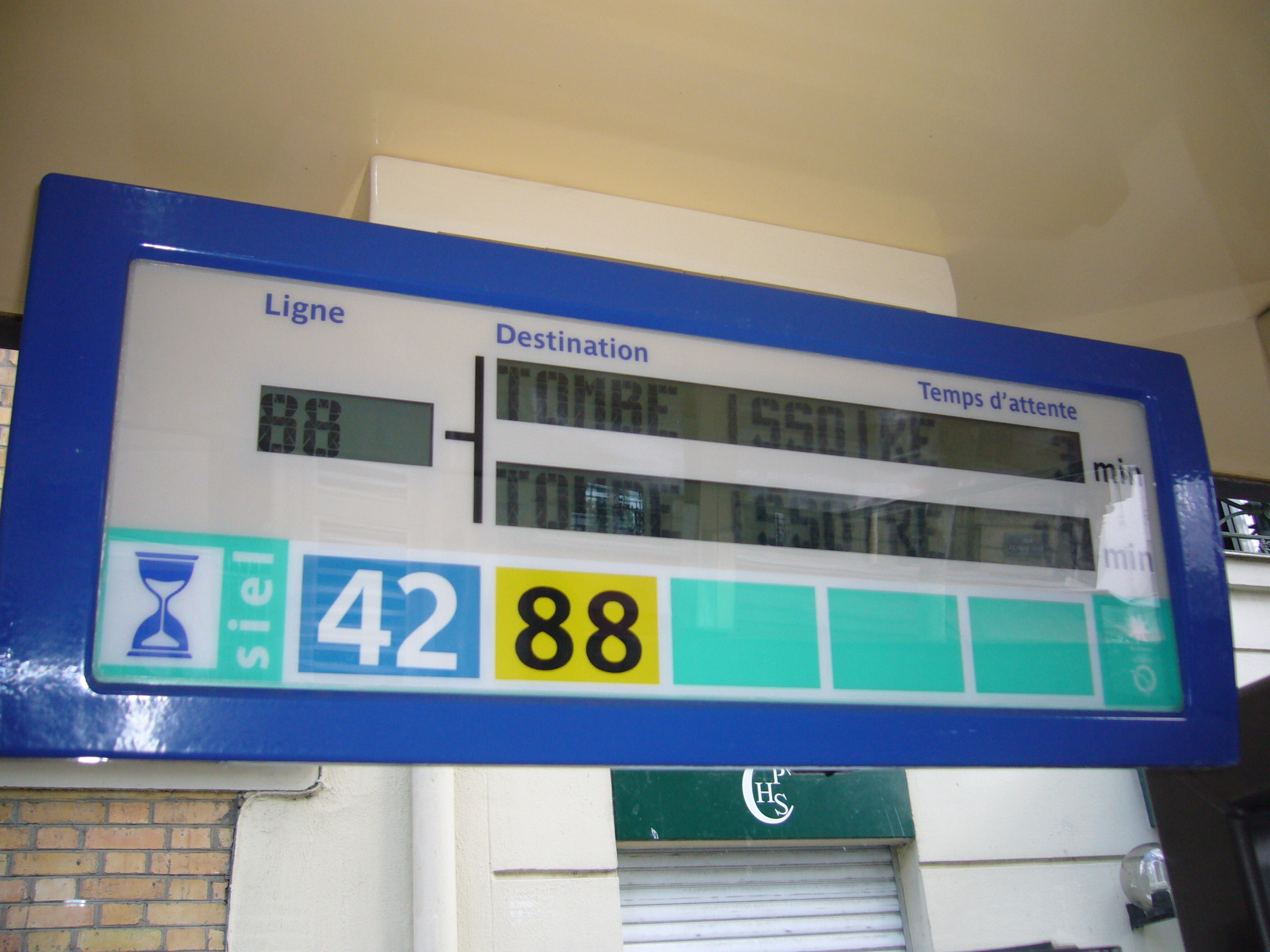
LCD used on Paris's bus system

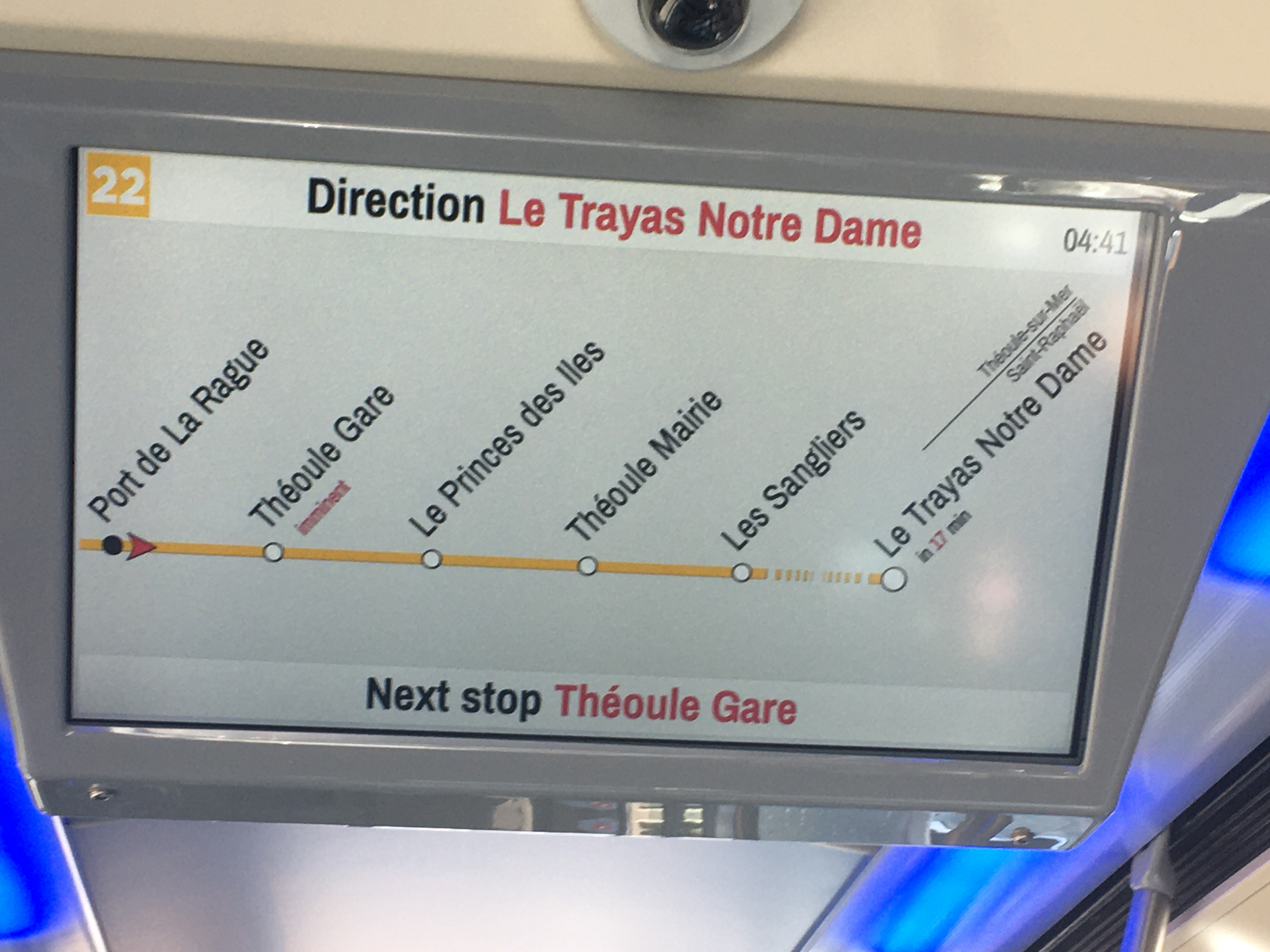
A SIV system on Palm Bus line 22's interior, also featured in Toulouse, Paris, Toulon, etc

=== Japan ===
In Japan, passenger information systems in commuter trains are typically installed above each passenger door. However, in one-person operated trains and buses, these displays are often located above the driver's seat at the front of the vehicle so that passengers can check fares when paying. In limited express trains and Shinkansen, the displays are usually installed above the partition doors leading to the deck areas of each car.

Information is generally provided in both Japanese and English. However, on lines and vehicles frequently used by foreign visitors, such as airport rail link, displays often support additional languages such as Chinese and Korean. In regions with large Brazilian populations, such as the Tōkai and northern Kantō regions, Portuguese-language displays are also provided (e.g., on Meitetsu Buses).

==== Overview ====
The adoption of passenger information systems in Japanese railway cars began to spread in the late 1980s. By utilizing the monitor’s train position detection functions calculated based on wheel rotation counts, etc., the timing of text display and automatic announcements can be synchronized.

In recent years, performance improvements in monitor systems and integration with communication devices such as VIS have led to expanded functions and display content.

Systems that receive data from the ground via digital transmission using train radio or mobile phone networks such as FOMA or Mobile WiMAX are becoming widespread. These systems display information such as news, advertisements, and train operation updates. Examples include:

- Train Channel (JR East)
- Tokyo Metro Vision (Tokyo Metro)
- TOQ Vision (Tokyu Corporation and Yokohama Minatomirai Railway)
- SaiNet Vision (Saitama Railway)
- Seibu Smile Vision (Seibu Railway)
- West Vision (JR West)

With the enactment of the Transportation Barrier-Free Act (ja:交通バリアフリー法) in the 2000s, now called the Barrier-Free New Act (ja:バリアフリー新法), new vehicles are required to include these display systems not just as service equipment, but as essential tools for informing hearing-impaired passengers about next stops, transfer guidance, and, for trains, which side the doors will open on. As a result, the systems have come to play a greater role as elements of universal design.

There are also cases, such as the Izukyū 2100 series trains, where onboard display systems are installed but used only during operation as limited express services or other premium services.

JR East discontinued its onboard news ticker service on March 12, 2021, citing the widespread availability of smartphones enabling passengers to access information independently. This service, which displayed news from various media outlets, had been in place since 2002 on its Shinkansen lines (Tōhoku, Jōetsu, Hokuriku, Yamagata, Akita) and limited express services such as Hitachi, Tokiwa, and Narita Express. Similar services on the Tōkaidō and Sanyō Shinkansen were also terminated, with Tōkaidō ending on March 13, 2020, and Sanyō on March 31, 2023.

==== Display Formats ====
===== Route Map Type =====
Seen in Tokyo Metro’s 01 series (Ginza Line) and 02 series (Marunouchi Line), the route map-style display shows the destination, next stop, and direction of travel using illuminated or flashing lamps. Although relatively simple, this type has the advantage of allowing passengers to grasp the entire route intuitively. However, due to increasing route complexity from through-services and the challenge of updating maps with new stations, lines, or timetable changes, LED-based text displays became the mainstream format from the late 1980s.

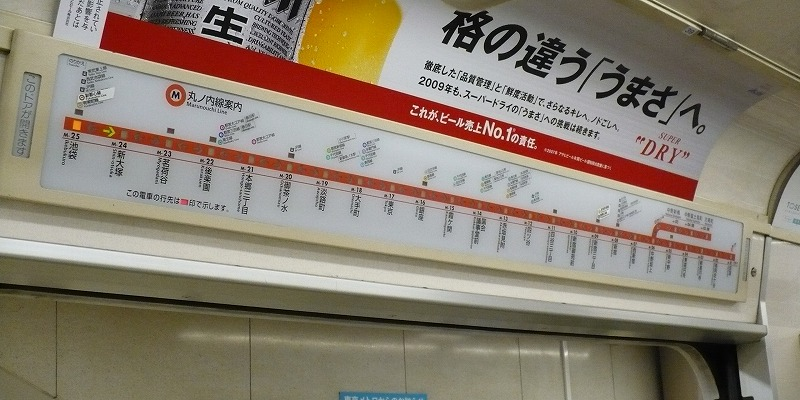
Route map type display on Tokyo Metro 02 series

===== LED Type =====
This type became widespread from the late 1980s. It uses strings of light-emitting diodes (LEDs) to display text and is now the most common format. Compared to route map-style displays, LED systems are more flexible when making updates. They can visually emphasize information through color combinations, scrolling, or blinking. Most are three-color displays, but since the late 2000s, full-color displays have also been introduced.

Some systems are capable of two-line vertical displays, while others separate destination and general information across two parallel screens (e.g., the Tobu 30000 series). In some cases, vacuum fluorescent displays (VFDs) are used instead of LEDs (e.g., Izukyū 8000 series).

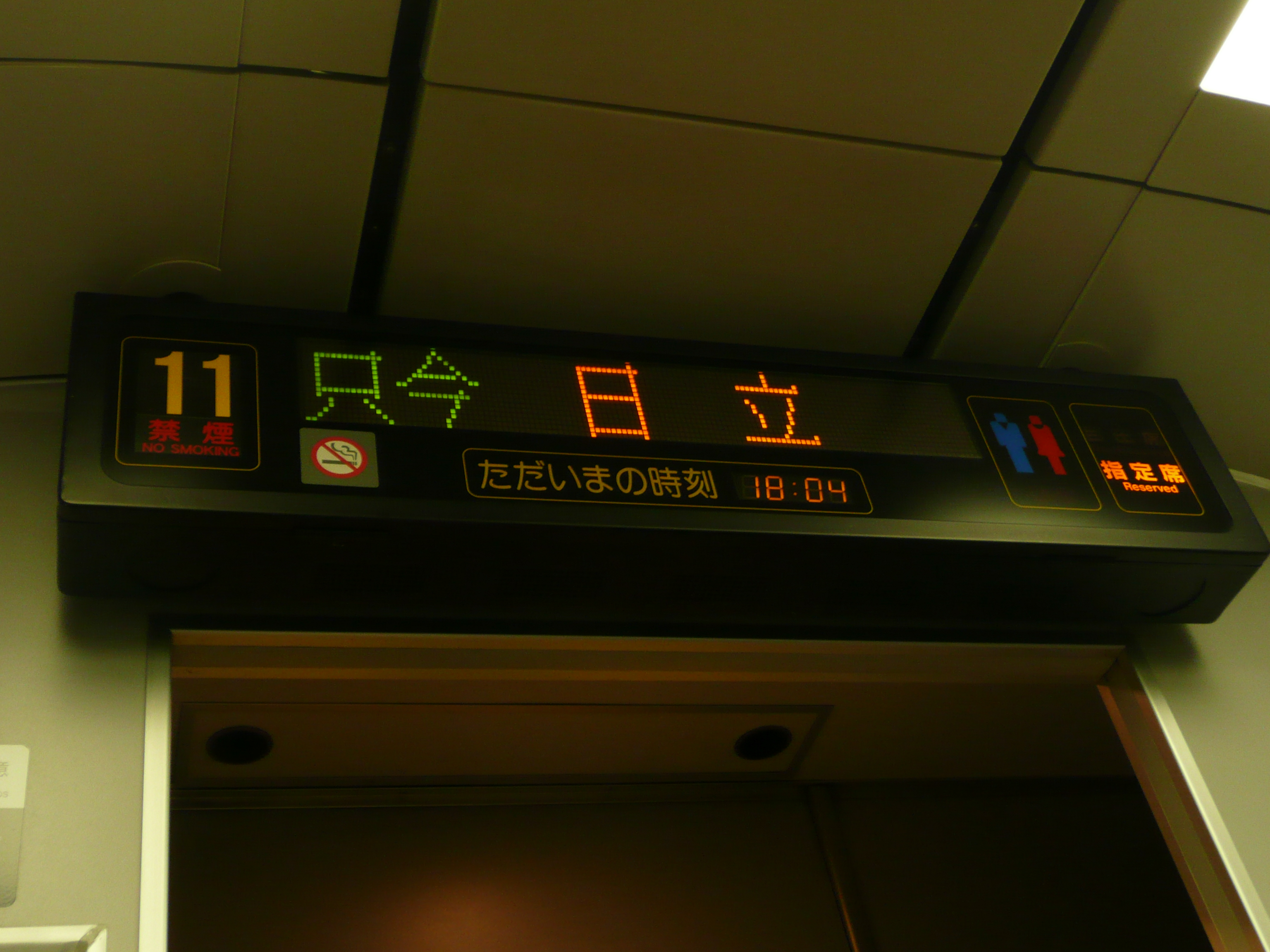
Example of three-color LED display: JR East 651 series train

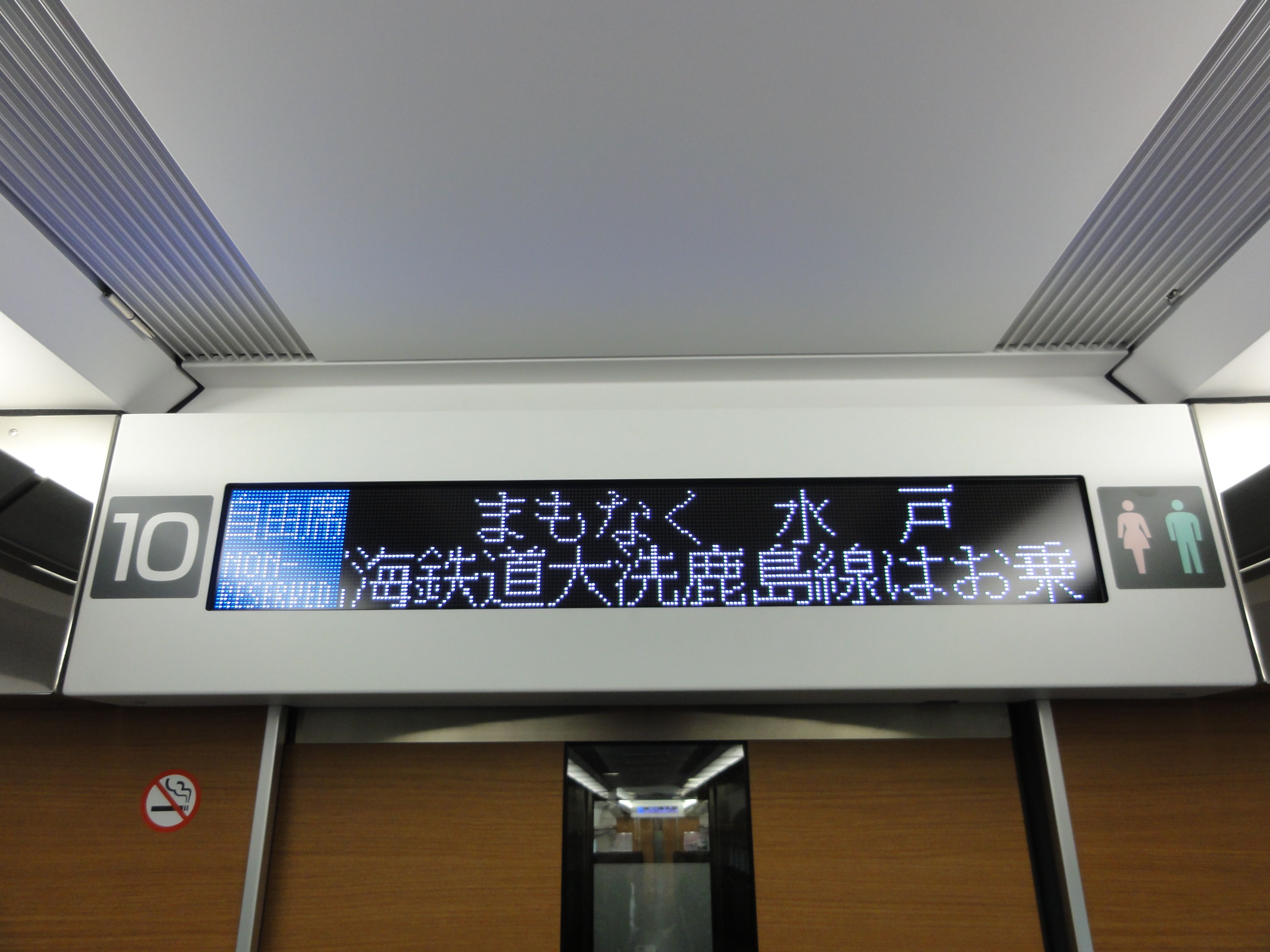
Example of full-color LED display: JR East E657 series train

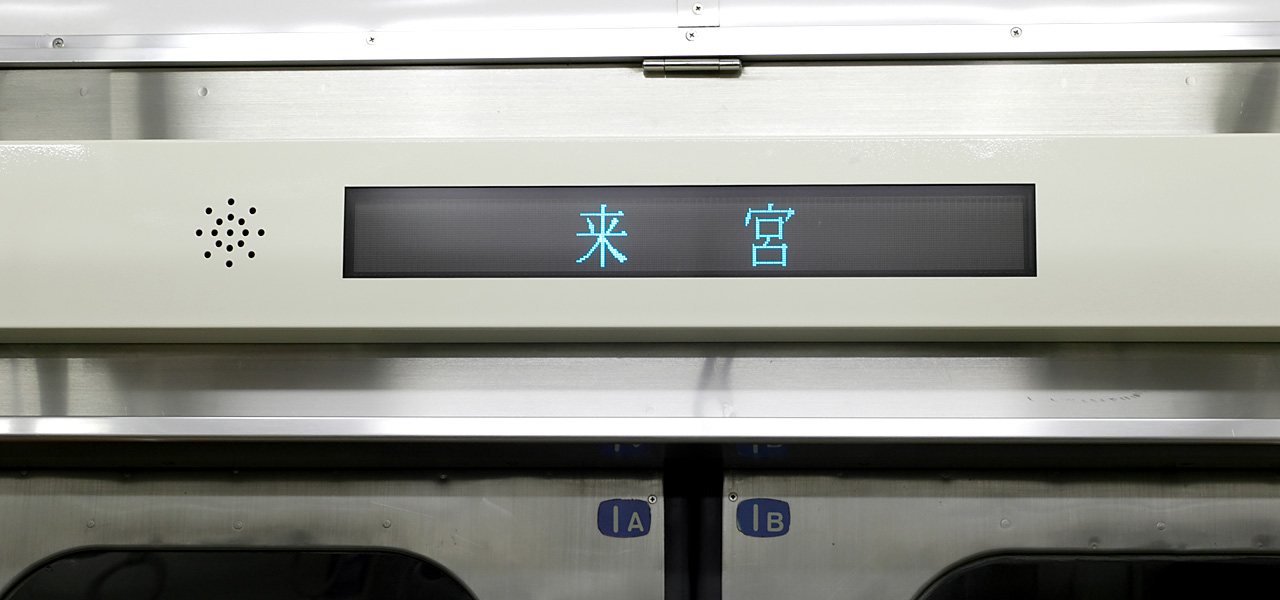
Example of VFD display: Izukyū 8000 series train

===== LCD Type =====
This system uses liquid-crystal displays (LCDs), allowing for a wide range of visual presentations including graphics and video. After being experimentally introduced by some operators in the 1990s (such as on the Tobu 9050 series), it became widely adopted in the mid-2000s. In addition to displaying information such as upcoming stops and service updates, some vehicles use LCDs for digital signage to show advertisements. Certain trains also have the capability to display forward-facing views from the lead car (e.g., Odakyu 50000 series, Kintetsu 21020 and 50000 series).

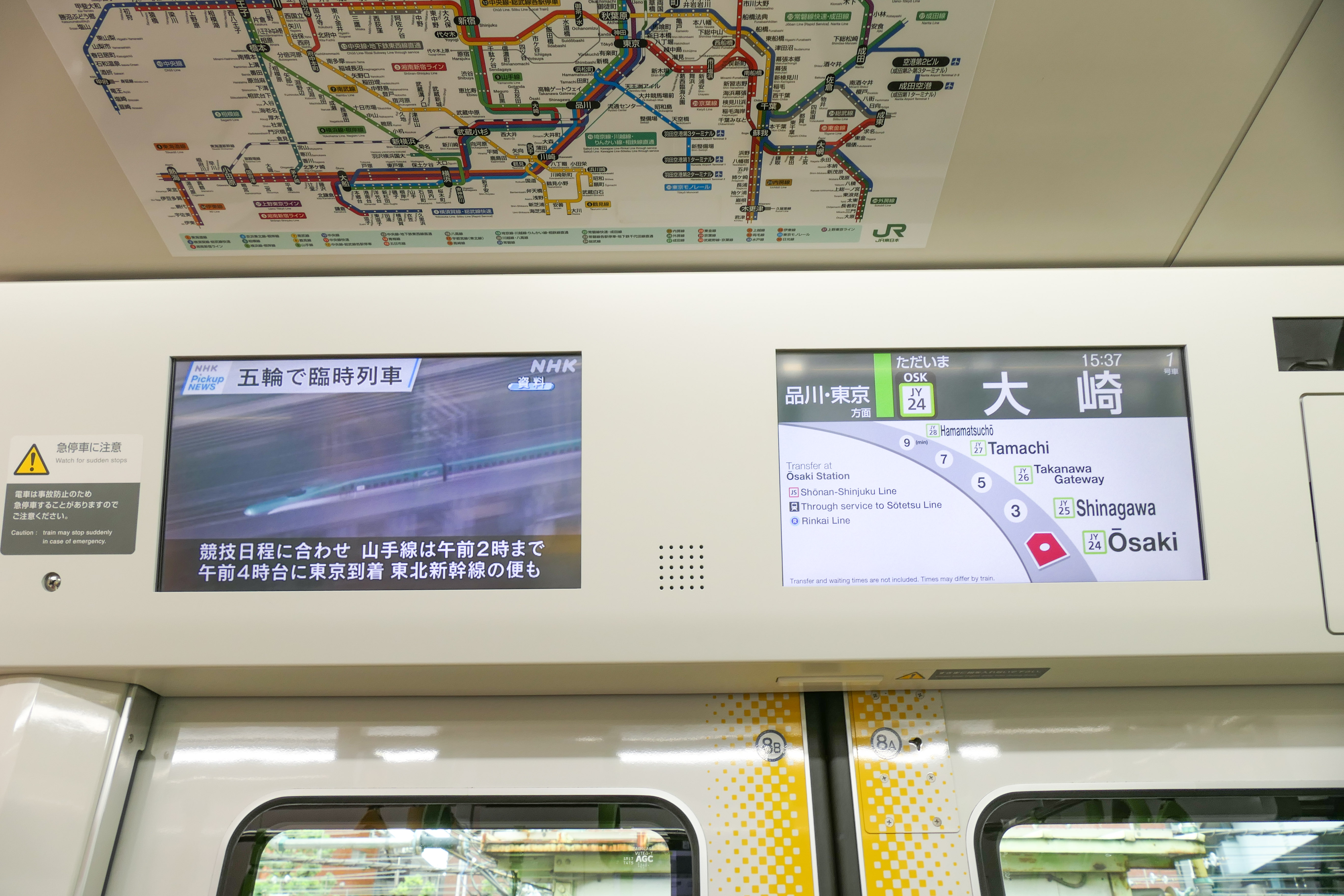
Example of LCD: JR East E235 series

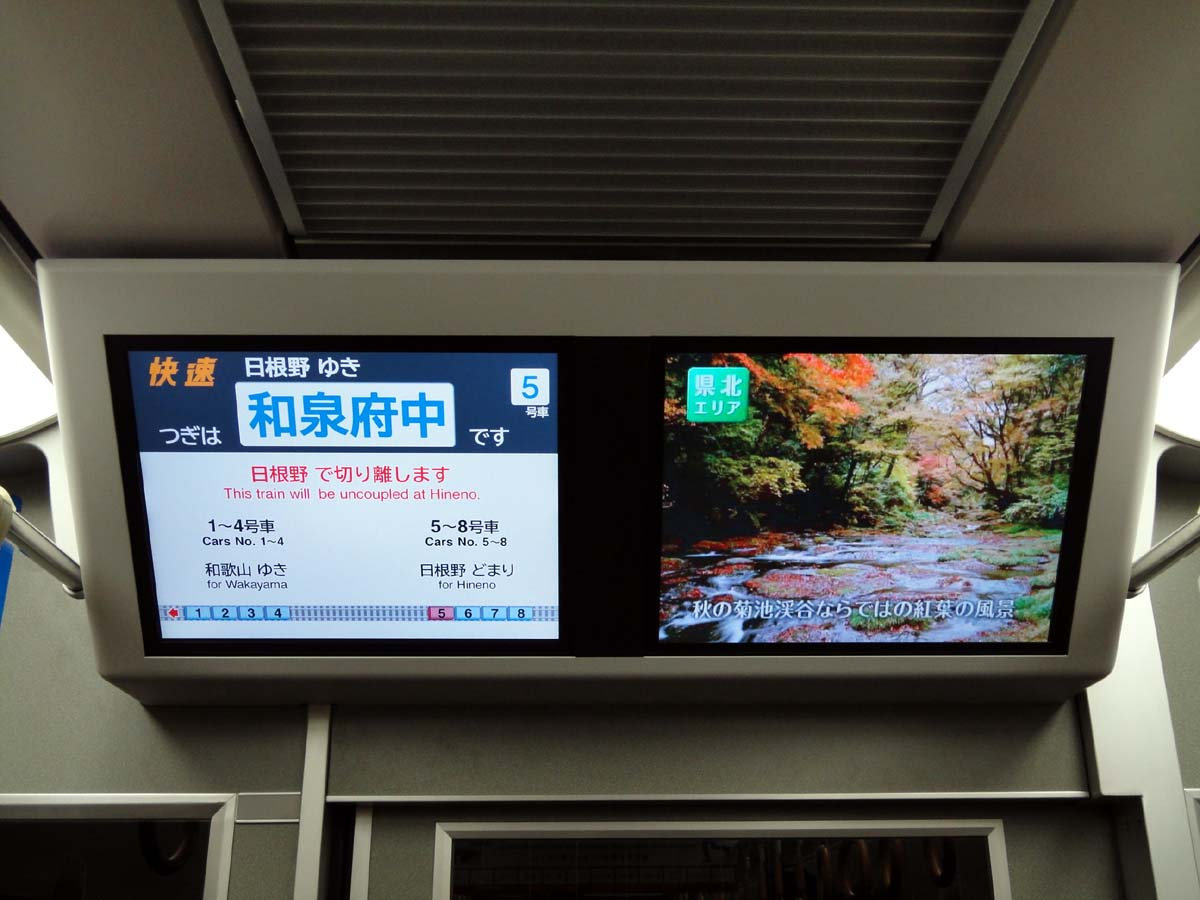
Example used for advertisements: JR West 225 series

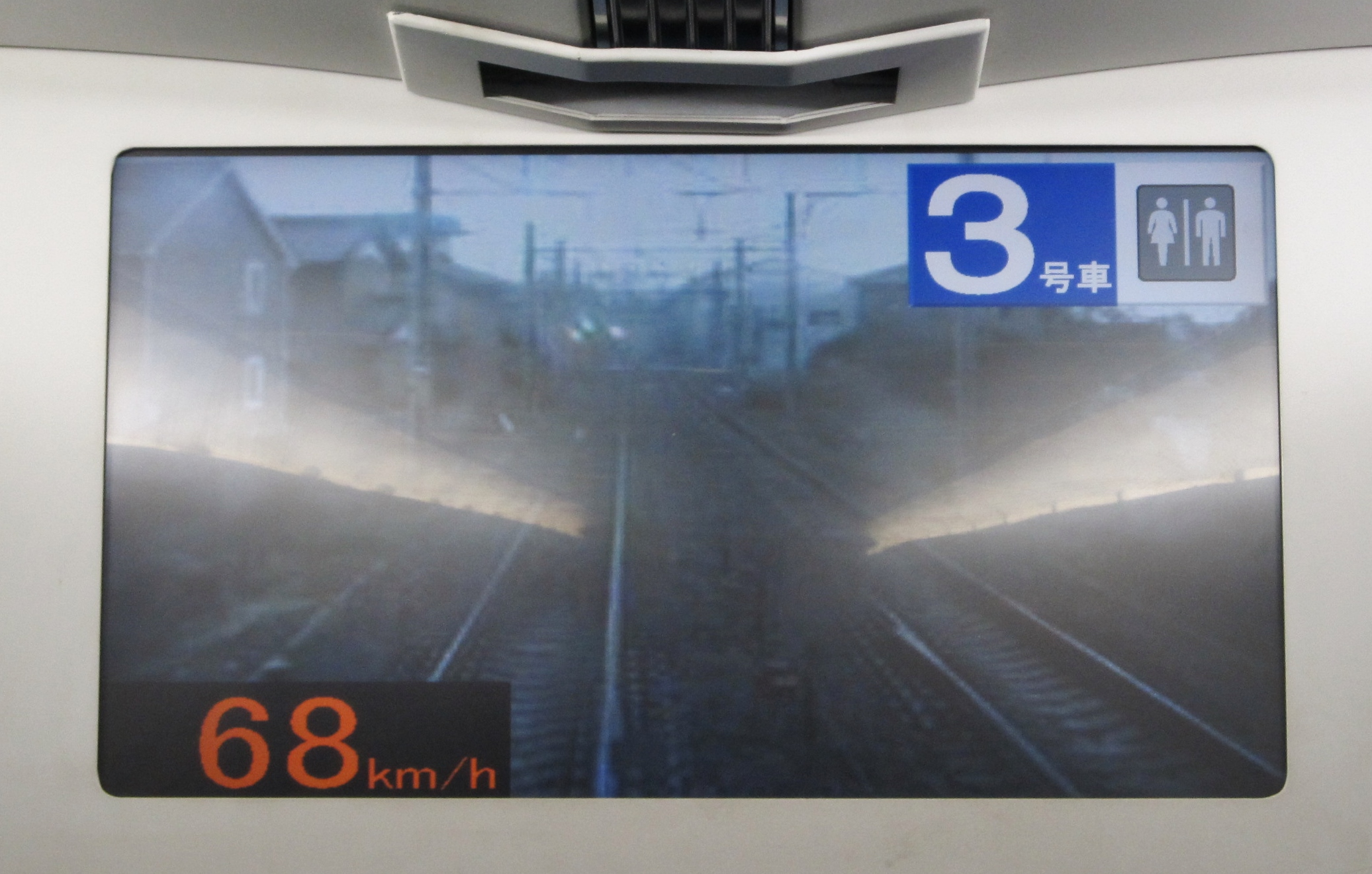
Example showing front view: Meitetsu 2000 series

===== Plasma Display Type =====
Before LED displays became widespread, some vehicles, such as the Shinkansen 100 (the early models) and 300 series, were equipped with plasma display panels (PDPs). These displays could only show red monochrome. Some trains (like the Shinkansen 500 series and JR West 681 series) were equipped with PDPs capable of displaying eight colors, but due to degradation and limited functionality, they were later replaced with three-color LED displays.

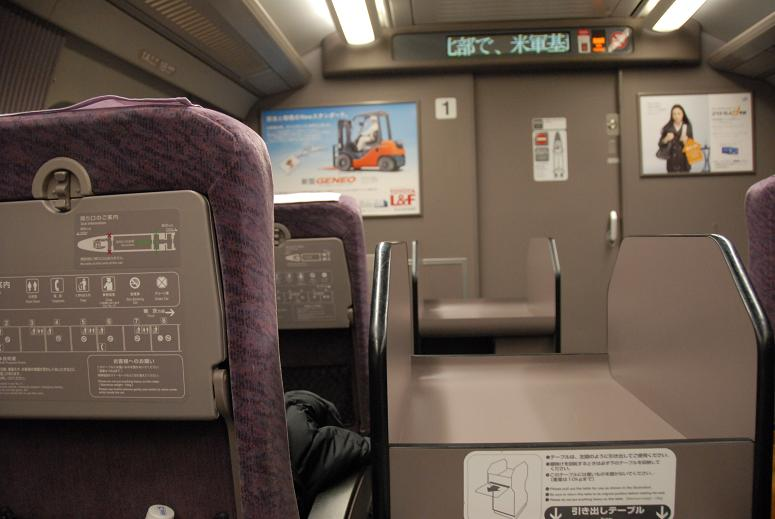
Example of 8-color PDP display: 500 Series Shinkansen

===== Illuminated Panel Type =====
This is a simple system that lights up only the next station on a panel. It is difficult to adapt to temporary stops or additional stations. The earliest known use dates back to 1930 on the Osaka Municipal Subway’s 100 series. As of 2010, this type was still in use on the JR Kyushu KiHa 125-400 series, which operates the limited express Umisachi Yamasachi.

===== Other Types =====
On the Tobu 6050 series used on rapid and semi-rapid services on the Tōbu Nikkō Line, destination and service type indicators are installed near the gangway doors and crew compartments. These were introduced to reduce passenger confusion between trains bound for the Kinugawa Line/Yagan Railway through services and those bound for Tōbu–Nikkō, replacing the older practice of hanging destination boards inside the cabin.

In the Japanese National Railways (JNR) era, similar destination indicators were installed inside express diesel cars operating in the Tōhoku region, where train splitting and combining were frequent. Keisei Electric Railway also used interior destination boards in its earlier "Red Train" models.

==== Installation Methods ====
Display units are generally installed either at the ends of passenger cabins or above passenger doors.

Displays installed at the ends of cars are often placed at both ends. This configuration is common in cars with cross seats, but visibility is reduced from the rear of the train. To address this, some newer trains have improved visibility by increasing display size or adding additional units in the middle of the cabin (e.g., Shinkansen 800 series).

For door-top installations, there are several variations. Some trains display above every door, while others have alternating displays above left and right doors (staggered layout), and some displays only on one side in the direction of travel (e.g., some JR Kyushu 813 and 817 series trains).

While LCDs are usually installed above doors, some trains, such as JR East’s E259 series, JR West’s 321 and 225 series, Keio 5000 series, and Seibu 40000 series, have them installed in three locations per car, with two displays on each side aligned parallel to rail sleepers. Kintetsu also installed LCDs in the smoking areas of its 21000 series "Urban Liner Plus" and 21020 series "Urban Liner Next" (now removed and covered with panels).

Additionally, trains like the JR East E235 series and Tokyu 2020 series have LCDs installed above luggage racks, primarily for advertising purposes.

==== Buses ====
As mentioned earlier, displays in buses are most commonly installed above the driver’s seat or directly behind the driver's compartment. However, on certain services such as the free terminal shuttle buses at Haneda Airport, displays are also mounted above the passenger doors—similar to train configurations—since boarding and alighting occur from all doors, unlike on regular route buses.

=== Germany ===
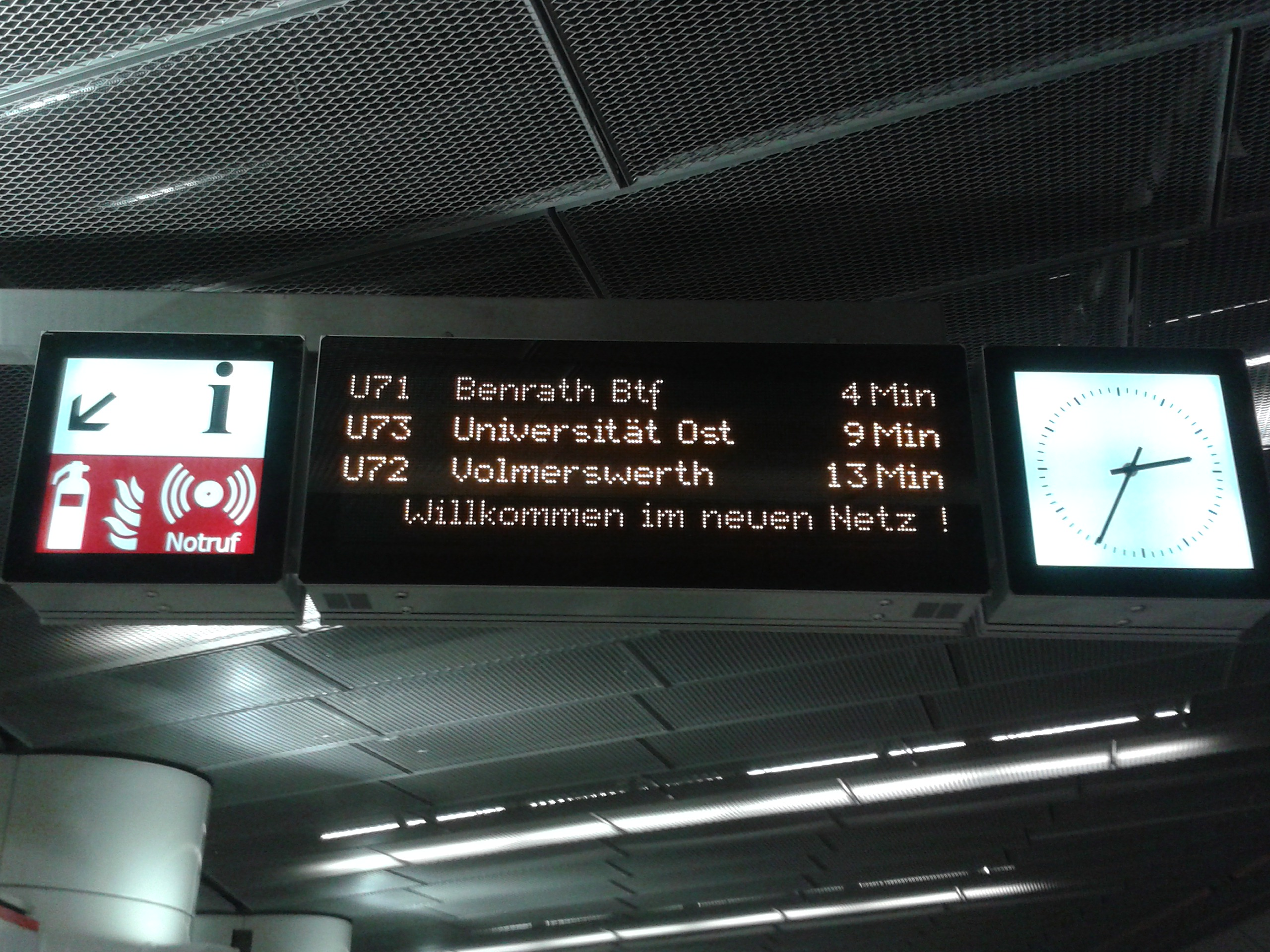
Stadtbahn passenger information display in Düsseldorf's new station at Heinrich-Heine-Allee with greeting message "welcome to the new network..."

Deutsche Bahn AG offers a Travel Information System (German: Reiseinformationssystem (RIS)). It shows current train times compared to the published timetable, as well as known delays and expected arrival and departure times of the trains. The information is made available to the train conductor (via SMS) as well as to the passenger via loudspeaker in the train station or schedule boards on the internet. The corresponding VRR and VRS information systems also process RIS data. The data can also be queried in real-time via mobile devices like mobile phones.

The RIS was started in 2003, and by 2007, it was planned to have 30,000 trains equipped with the necessary train describer (electronic train number). In an accompanying program the older split-flap displays were replaced by electronic dot-matrix signage. Large stations have platform displays with multiple rows, but the Deutsche Bahn network operator developed the Dynamic Font Indicator (German: Dynamischer Schriftanzeiger (DSA)) standard system for smaller stations with a single row. In 2011, a federal funding was granted to equip 4500 additional stations with DSA signage, making for most of the 6500 DSAs by 2015.

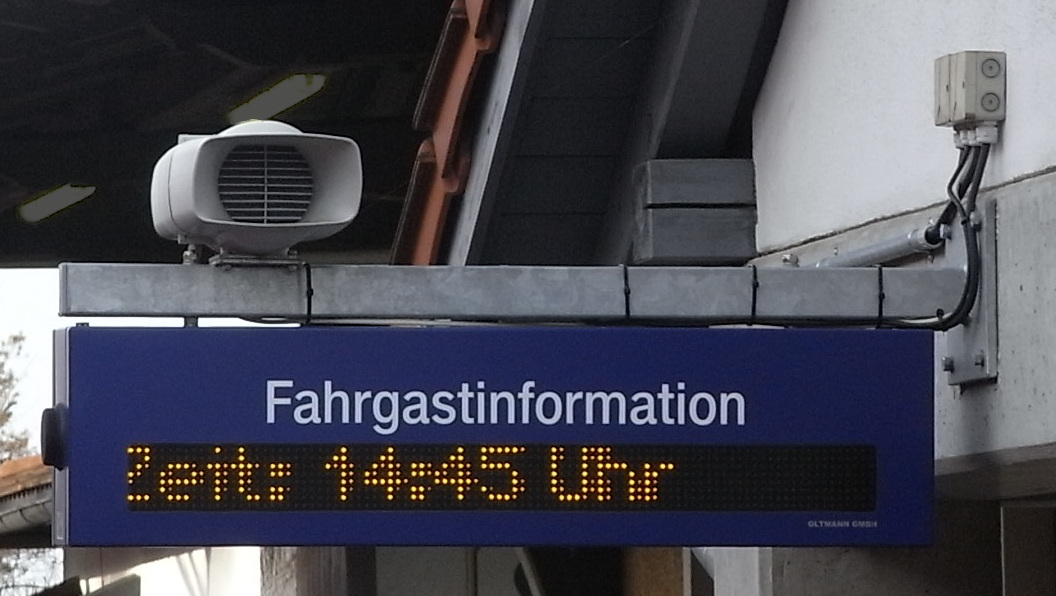
DSA passenger information system

The federal grant came along with a Federal Railway Authority (German: Eisenbahn-Bundesamt (EBA)) order in 2010 to have all stations connected to the travel information system to announce delays with electronic signage or loudspeakers. The Deutsche Bahn operator tried to block that order legally for stations with a very low frequency but lost all lawsuits in 2015. It was given 18 months to equip the remaining stations with DSAs. The DSA system has a GSM radio module to receive a text message to be displayed in a horizontally-moving news ticker style. A loudspeaker may optionally be mounted on top. When there is no delay, the current time is shown statically on its 96×8 LED dot-matrix display.

=== United Kingdom ===
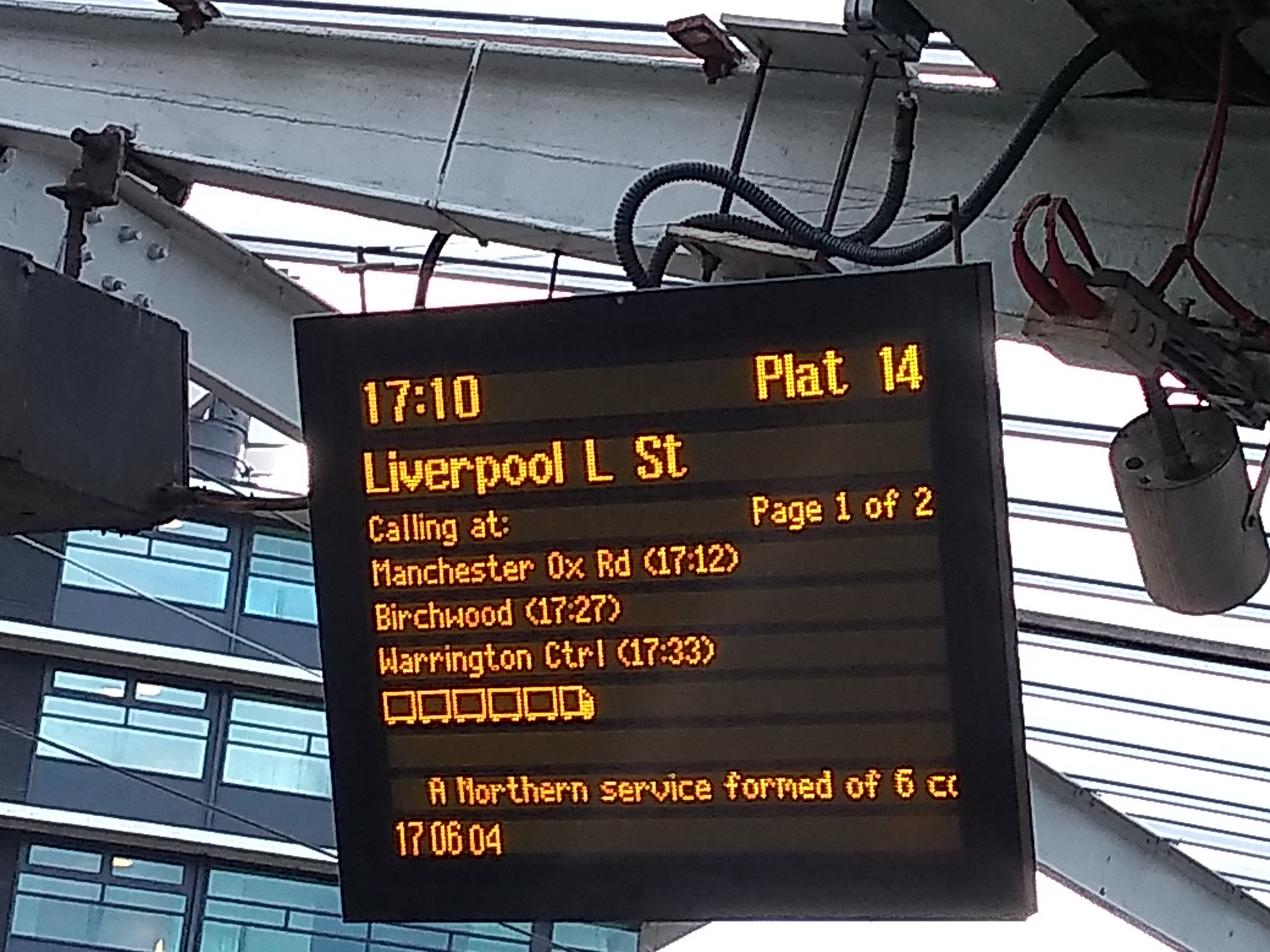
A typical British passenger information display at Manchester Piccadilly

National Rail stations are equipped with visual platform displays and audio announcements, which indicate the next service or services from the platform and warn passengers to stand clear of trains that are not scheduled to stop, not in use or are about to depart. Additionally, concourses and ticket offices have large screen displays that show all of the services available at the station for the next hour or more and, at major stations, the full route of the service and any restrictions applicable (e.g. ticket types, catering services, bicycle carriage). Many smaller and less well-used railway stations have, instead of such systems, "passenger help points", which connect the user by telephone to a control room by pressing an "Information" button.

The information is available online at the National Rail website and on mobile devices.

Most London Underground stations have "countdown" displays on each platform. They are simpler than the national rail displays since most platforms serves only a single line, and there are few or no variations in carriage restrictions and destinations served. Audio announcements are also made regularly.

Local authorities and some transport operators provide electronic versions of the bus timetables to the Traveline information service, which covers all public transport modes, and from there to other information services such as Google Transit.

The deployment of real-time bus information systems is a gradual process and currently extends to around half of the national fleet and a high proportion of town-centre stops but relatively few suburban and rural locations. The first use of such systems was in Brighton and Hove. The Traveline NextBuses information service provides the next departures from any bus stop in the UK, and some trams as well. The information has the real-time feed that has been connected in; otherwise, the scheduled times are given.

The government-sponsored Transport Direct project provided journey planning across all transport modes (including private car) and was increasingly linked to real-time information systems prior to its discontinuation in 2014.

=== United States ===
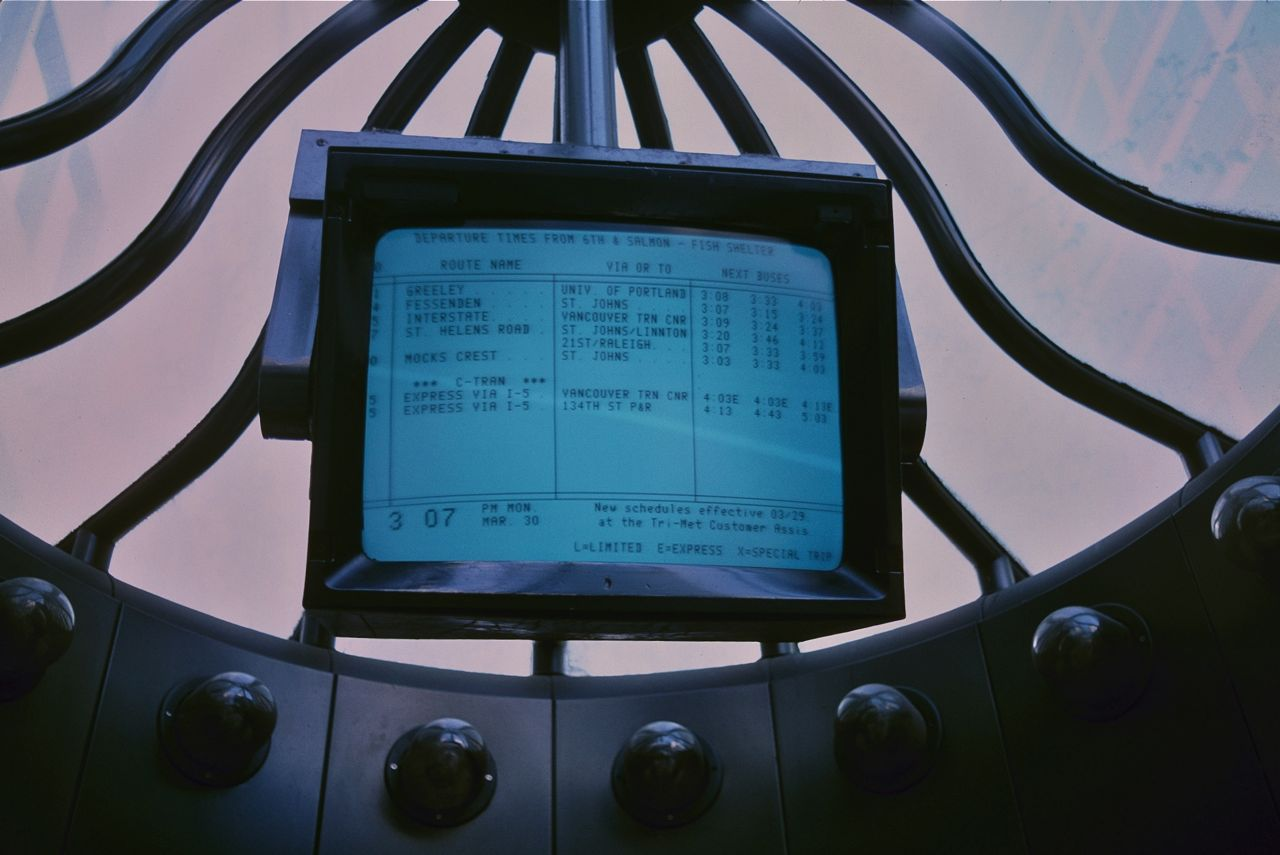
The CCTV schedule-information monitors in each shelter of Portland Transit Mall were considered groundbreaking in urban transit use when the mall opened. This photo was taken in 1987.

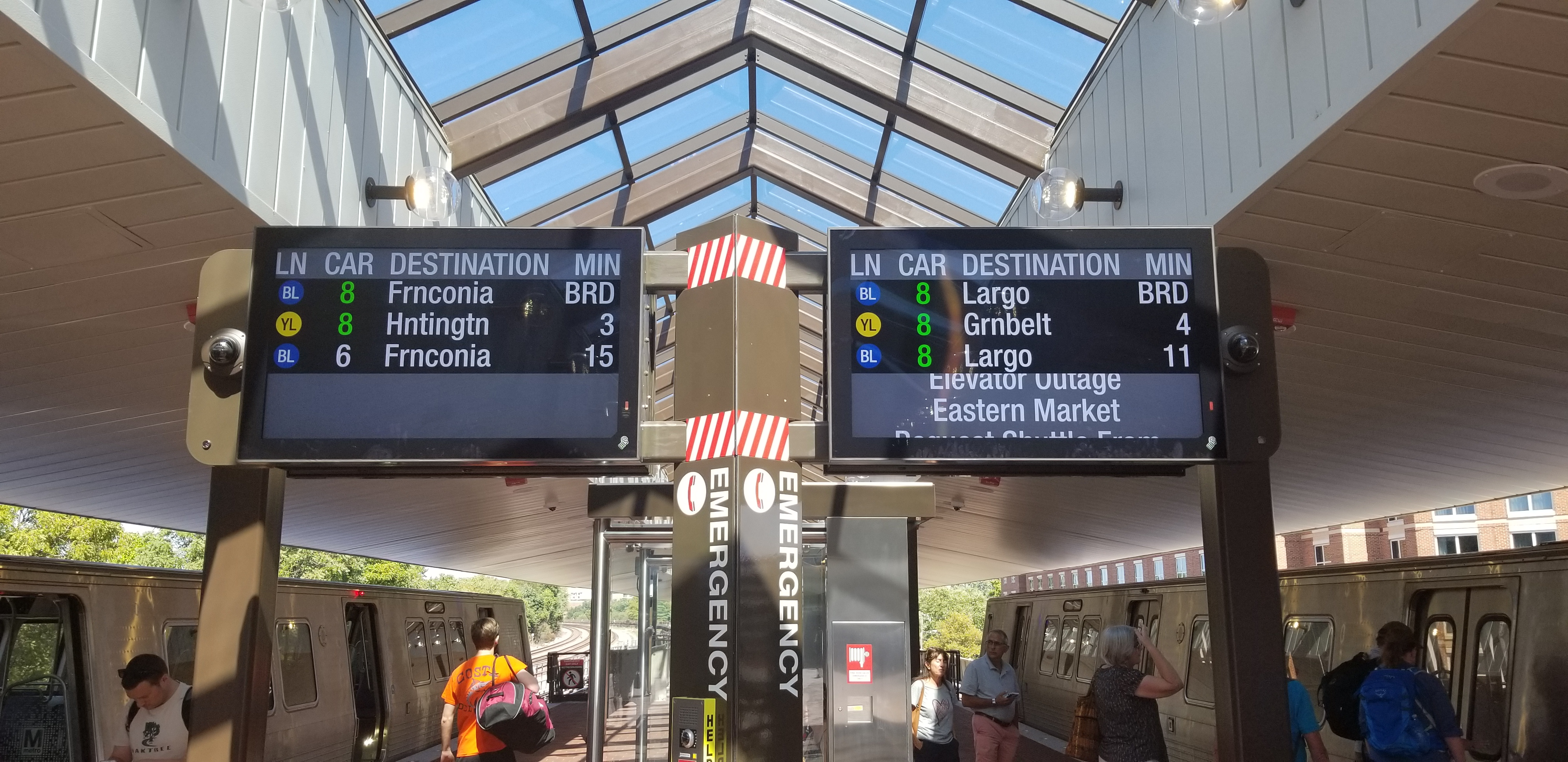
A PIDS at the King Street–Old Town station of the Washington Metro

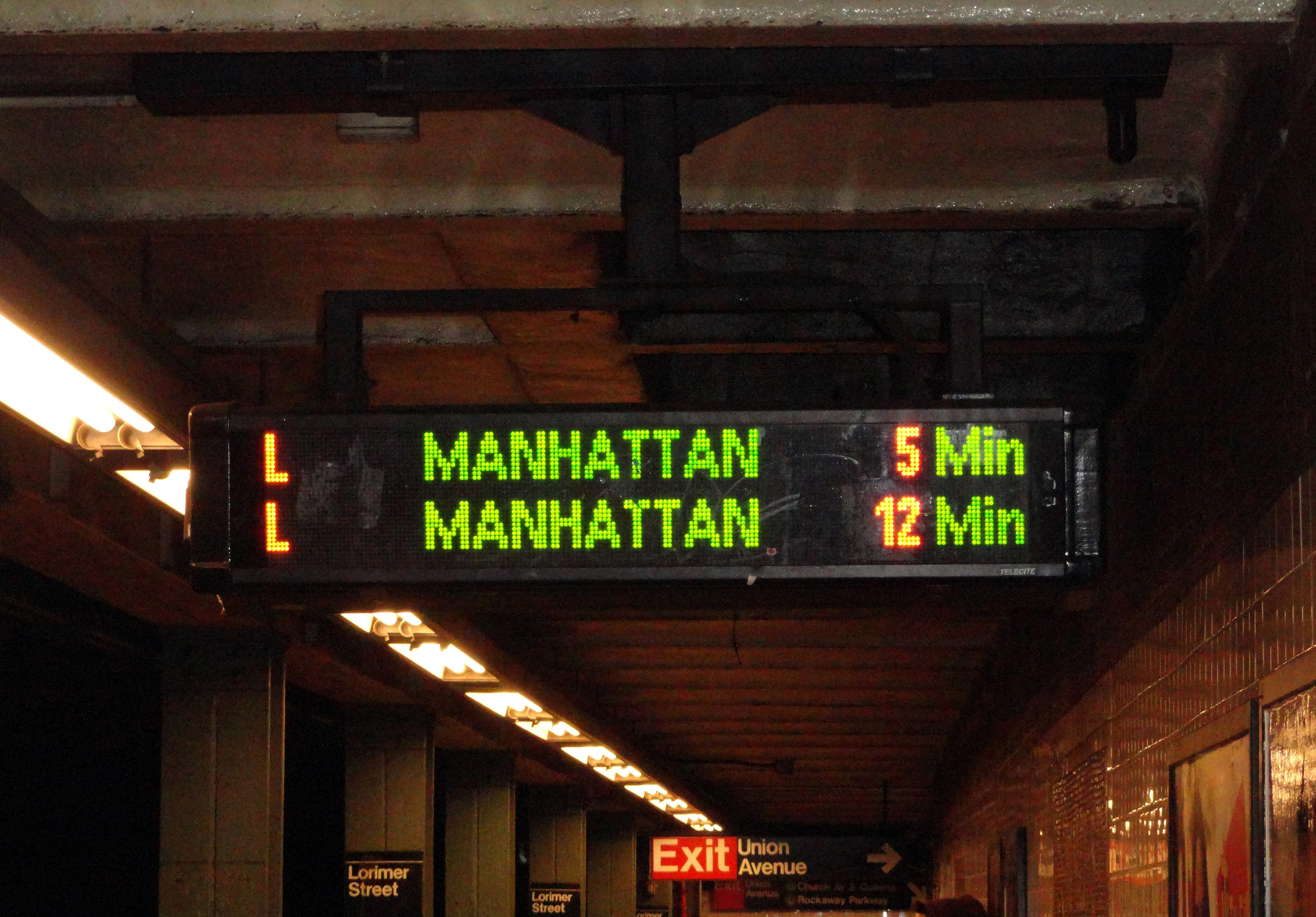
A PIDS at the Lorimer Street station of the New York City Subway

Real-time passenger information was brought to riders in the US by NextBus corporation, a small start-up, in 1999. The first systems were installed in Emeryville, California, and later in San Francisco, California. As of 2012, both initial systems are still in operation.

The Washington Metro installed a passenger information display system (PIDS) in all of its stations in 2000. The system provides real-time information on next train arrivals, delayed trains, emergency announcements, and related information. Metro also provides current train and related information to customers with conventional web browsers, as well as users of smartphones and other mobile devices. In 2010, Metro began sharing its PIDS data with outside software developers for use in creating additional real-time applications for mobile devices. Free apps are available to the public on major mobile device software platforms (iPhone/iPad, Android, Windows Phone, Palm). The system also began providing real-time train information by phone in 2010.

The New York City Subway began installing its public address/customer information screens, commonly known as "countdown clocks", in its stations in 2007. In 2012, the system began offering SubTime, a website and iPhone app for real-time train arrival estimates for several of its subway services. The arrival data are shared with outside software developers to support creation of additional apps. There are also PIDS installed on some MTA Regional Bus Operations routes over the years, but mostly, the MTA offers real-time bus tracking through another website/app called MTA Bus Time.

The Boston MBTA Red, Orange, and Blue Lines introduced countdown clocks in early 2014, and the Green Line introduced them the following year. The eastern end of the Green Line introduced clocks in early 2016. They reflect how many "stops away" the train is, rather than how many minutes it will take to arrive. Amtrak has deployed PIDS throughout the Northeast Corridor.

As of 2010, PIDS are being deployed with unified messaging, which can include information streamed to mobile devices, phones and translated directly to voice announcements. Text to Speech products have been designed to convert PIDS data to speech in a choice of over 20 languages.

== See also ==
- Fleet digitalization
- Fleet telematics system
- General Transit Feed Specification
- Identification of Fixed Objects in Public Transport (IFOPT)
- Intelligent transportation system
- IEEE Intelligent Transportation Systems Society
- Journey planner
- Onboard passenger information system
- Platform display
- Real Time Information Group (RTIG), UK organisation
- Service Interface for Real Time Information (SIRI), technical specifications and standards
- Transmodel, CEN European Reference Data Model
