= 415 series =

Japanese train type

415 series 401 series/403 series/421 series/423 series
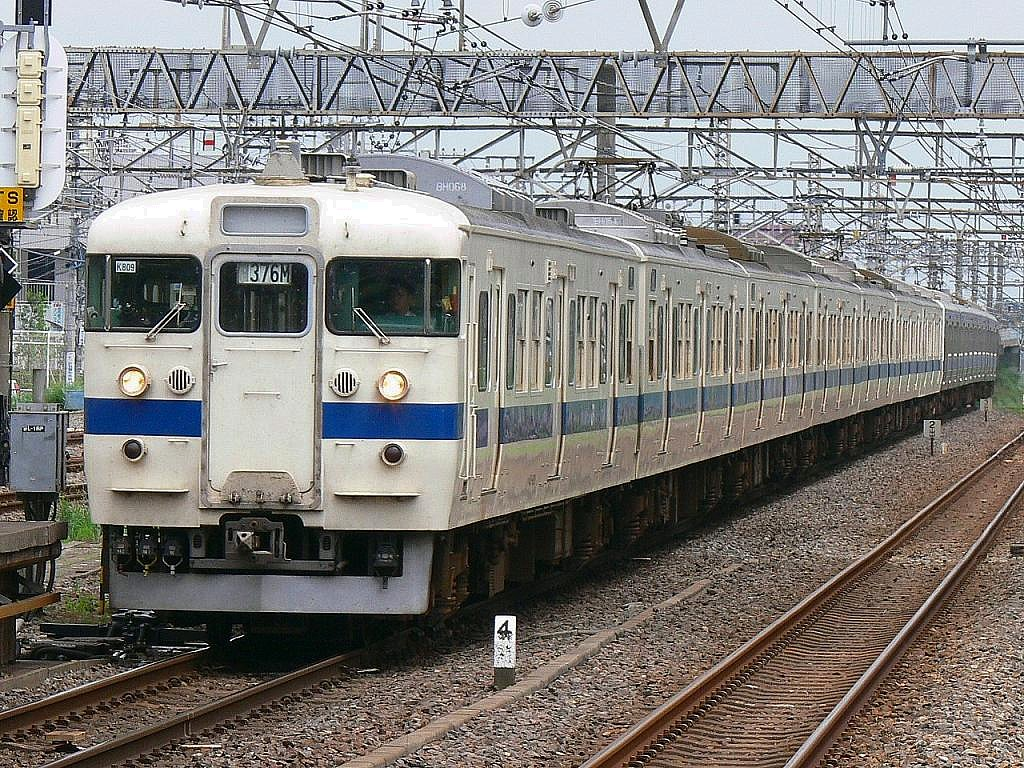
- A 415 series train on the Jōban Line approaching Abiko Station in July 2006
- Manufacturers: Hitachi, Kawasaki Heavy Industries, Kinki Sharyo, Nippon Sharyo, Tokyu Car Corporation, JR-West
- Constructed: 1971–1991
- Entered service: 1971
- Number built: 674 vehicles
- Successor: E531 series
- Formation: 3/4/7 cars per trainset
- Operators: JNR (1971–1987); JR East (1987–2016); JR Kyushu (1987–present); JR-West (1991-2021)
- Line served: Various

Specifications
- Car body construction: Steel/stainless steel
- Car length: 19.5–20 m (63 ft 11 11/16 in – 65 ft 7 3/8 in)
- Width: 2,950 mm (9 ft 8 1/8 in)
- Height: 3.654–3.67 m (11 ft 11 7/8 in – 12 ft 1/2 in)
- Maximum speed: 100 km/h (62.1 mph)
- Traction system: Resistor control (401 series and 421 series sets) MT46 (403 series and 415 series sets) MT54
- Power output: 100 kW (MT46B) (401 series); 120 kW
- Electric system: 1,500 V DC / 20 kV AC 50 Hz/60 Hz overhead catenary
- Current collection: Pantograph
- Track gauge: 1,067 mm (3 ft 6 in)

The 415 series (415系, 415-kei) is a dual-voltage AC/DC outer-suburban electric multiple unit (EMU) train type introduced in 1971 by Japanese National Railways (JNR), and later operated in Japan by East Japan Railway Company (JR East), Kyushu Railway Company (JR Kyushu), and West Japan Railway Company (JR-West).

== Variants ==
The 415 series was introduced in 1971, and has since spawned six variants, as listed below.

- 415-0 series
- 415-100 series
- 415-500 series
- 415-700 series
- 415-800 series
- 415-1500 series

The 415 series is descended from the 401, 403, 421 and 423 series.

== 401/421 series ==
401 series / 421 series
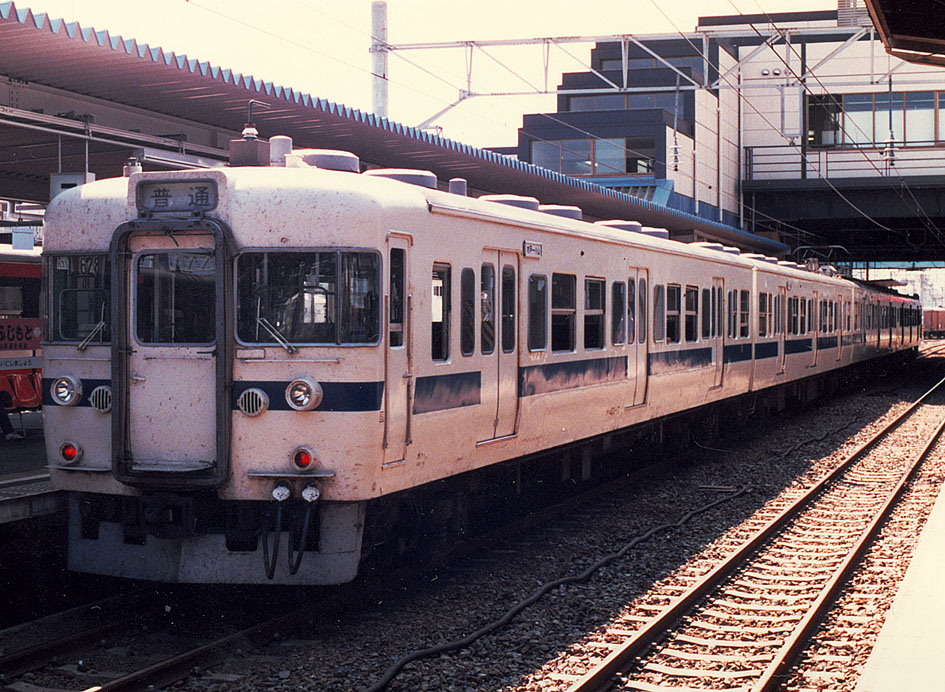
- A Joban Line 401 series set in January 1985

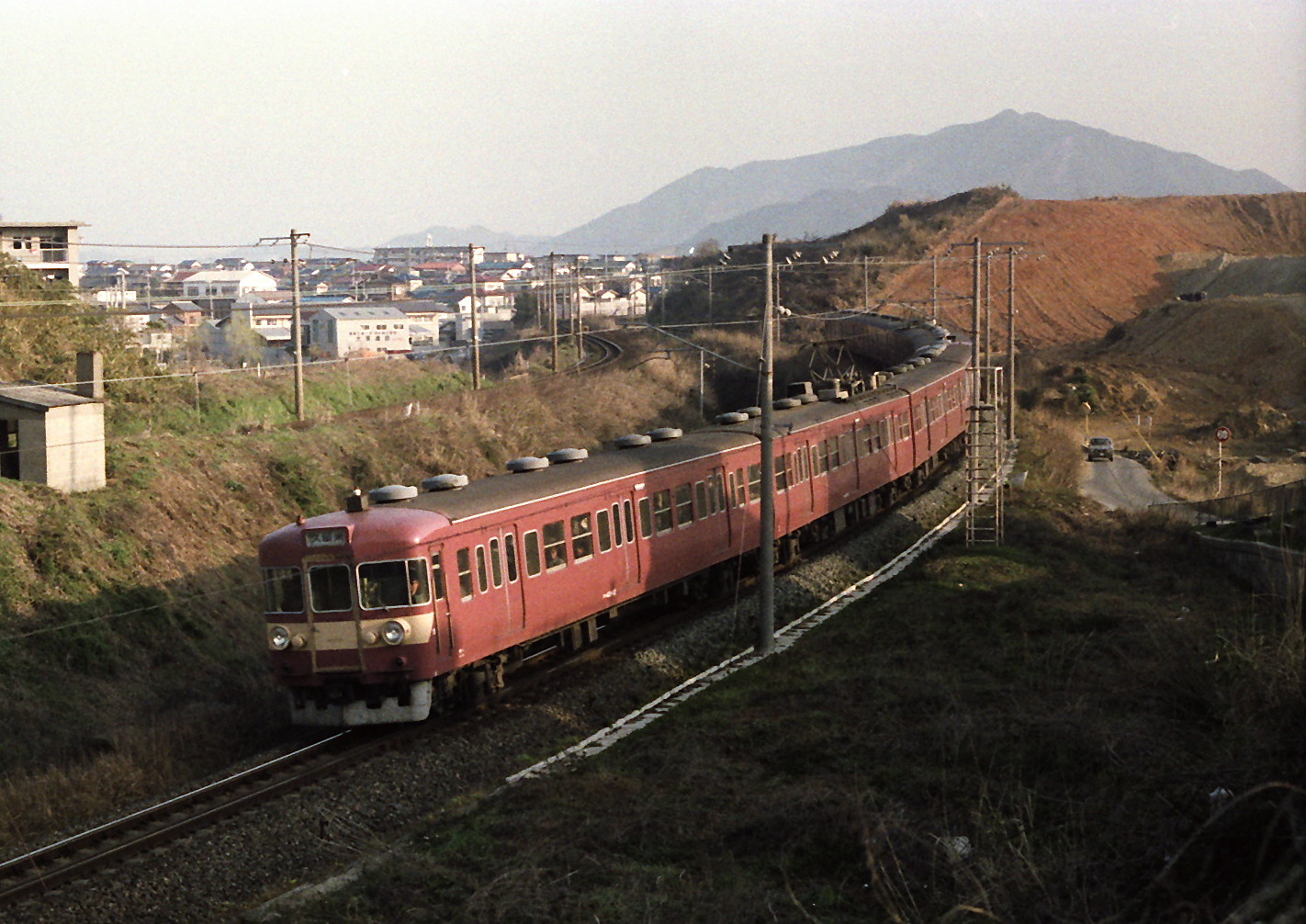
- A 421 series train on Sanyō Main Line in March 1978
- In service: 1960–1991 (401 series); 1960–1996 (421 series)
- Manufacturers: Tokyu Car Corporation; Kinki Sharyo (421 series); Nippon Sharyo (401 series); Kawasaki Sharyo; Hitachi
- Constructed: 1960–1966
- Entered service: 1960
- Refurbished: 1964–1966 (SaYa 420 for 421 series)
- Scrapped: 1978–1991 (401 series); 1979–1996 (421 series)
- Number built: 401 series: 100 vehicles (25 sets); 421 series: 92 vehicles (23 sets)
- Number in service: None
- Number preserved: None
- Number scrapped: 100 vehicles (401 series); 92 vehicles (421 series)
- Successor: E501 series, 811 series, 813 series
- Formation: 4 cars per trainset
- Operators: 401 series: JNR (1960–1987); JR East (1987–1991); 421 series: JNR (1960–1987); JR Kyushu (1987–1996)
- Lines served: 401 series: Joban Line; 421 series: Sanyo Main Line; Kagoshima Main Line

Specifications
- Car body construction: Steel body
- Width: 2,900 mm (9 ft 6 3/16 in)
- Doors: 3 pairs per side
- Maximum speed: Service:100 km/h (62 mph); Design:110 km/h (68 mph)
- Traction system: Resistor control
- Traction motors: MT46B
- Power output: 100kW per motor
- Transmission: Gear ratio: 17:82
- Power supply: 20kVA Motor Generator
- Electric systems: 401 series: 1,500 V DC & 20 kV AC (50 Hz); 421 series: 1,500 V DC & 20 kV AC (60 Hz)
- Current collection: Pantograph
- Bogies: DT21B (motored); TR62 (trailer for 401 series); TR64 (trailer for 421 series)
- Track gauge: 1,067 mm (3 ft 6 in)

The 401 series & 421 series was introduced for Joban Line and Sanyo Main Line respectively in 1960 and produced until 1966. They were introduced on the Jōban Line. They were equipped with MT46B motors with 100 kW (130 hp) of power output. The last 401 series trains were withdrawn in 1991, while the last 421 series trains operated by JR Kyushu remained and withdrawn from service until 1996.

== 403/423 series ==
The first 403 series set was introduced in 1965, along with the similar 423 series. The 403 series was capable of running on railway lines with 1.5 kV DC and 20 kV AC 50 Hz, while 423 series is capable of 1.5 kV and 20 kV AC 60 Hz railway electrification. The last 423 series was withdrawn in 2001, while the 403 series remained in service until 2008.

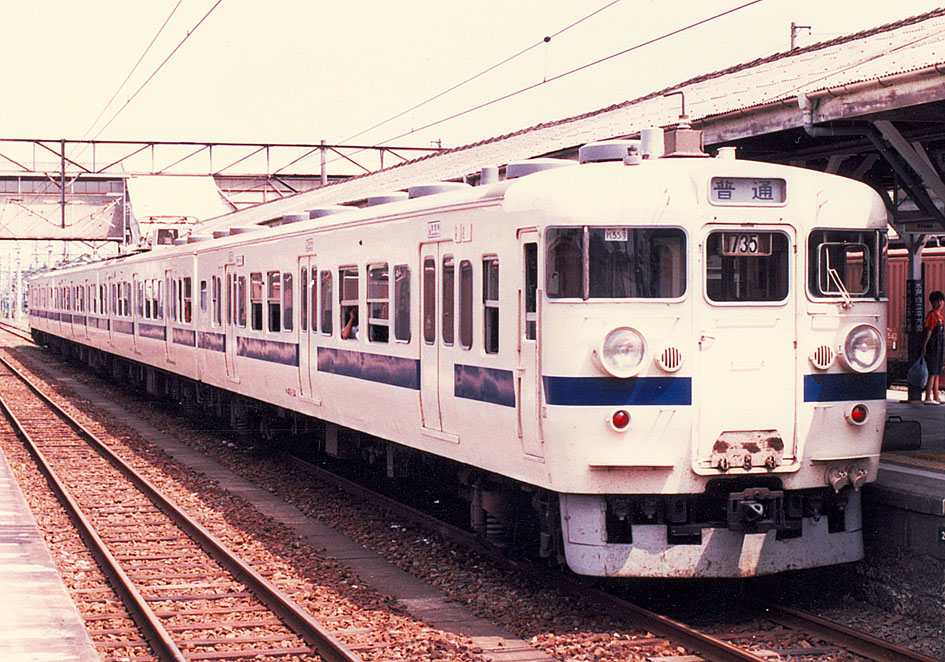
403 series set K55 on the Jōban Line in 1985

== 415-0 series ==
This was the original version of the 415 series train, and was manufactured from 1971 to 1974, and had air-conditioners installed in 1977. The Jōban Line and Mito Line trains were withdrawn in March 2007 in favour of the new E531 series trains, but 415-0 series were still in operation with JR Kyushu as of January 2013.

=== Kyushu ===
The first 415-0 series sets allocated to Kyushu were 4-car units delivered in December 1974. These were formed KuHa 411-300 + MoHa 415 + MoHa 414 + KuHa 411-300. Originally delivered in the JNR livery of brick red ("Red No. 13") with cream ("Cream No. 4") warning panels on the cab ends, these sets were repainted between 1986 and 1987 into a new livery of white with blue bodyside stripe, carried up until the present day. Some sets later received life-extension refurbishment with transverse seating replaced by longitudinal seating.

=== Livery variations ===
JR Kyushu set FM5 was re-painted in the old JNR livery in 2000 to commemorate the millennium celebrations in Japan. It operated in this livery until it was withdrawn in 2012.

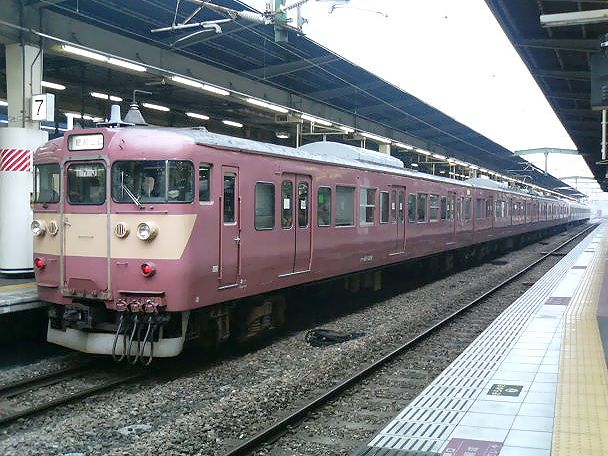
JR Kyushu 415-0 series set FM5 in JNR-era livery, June 2006

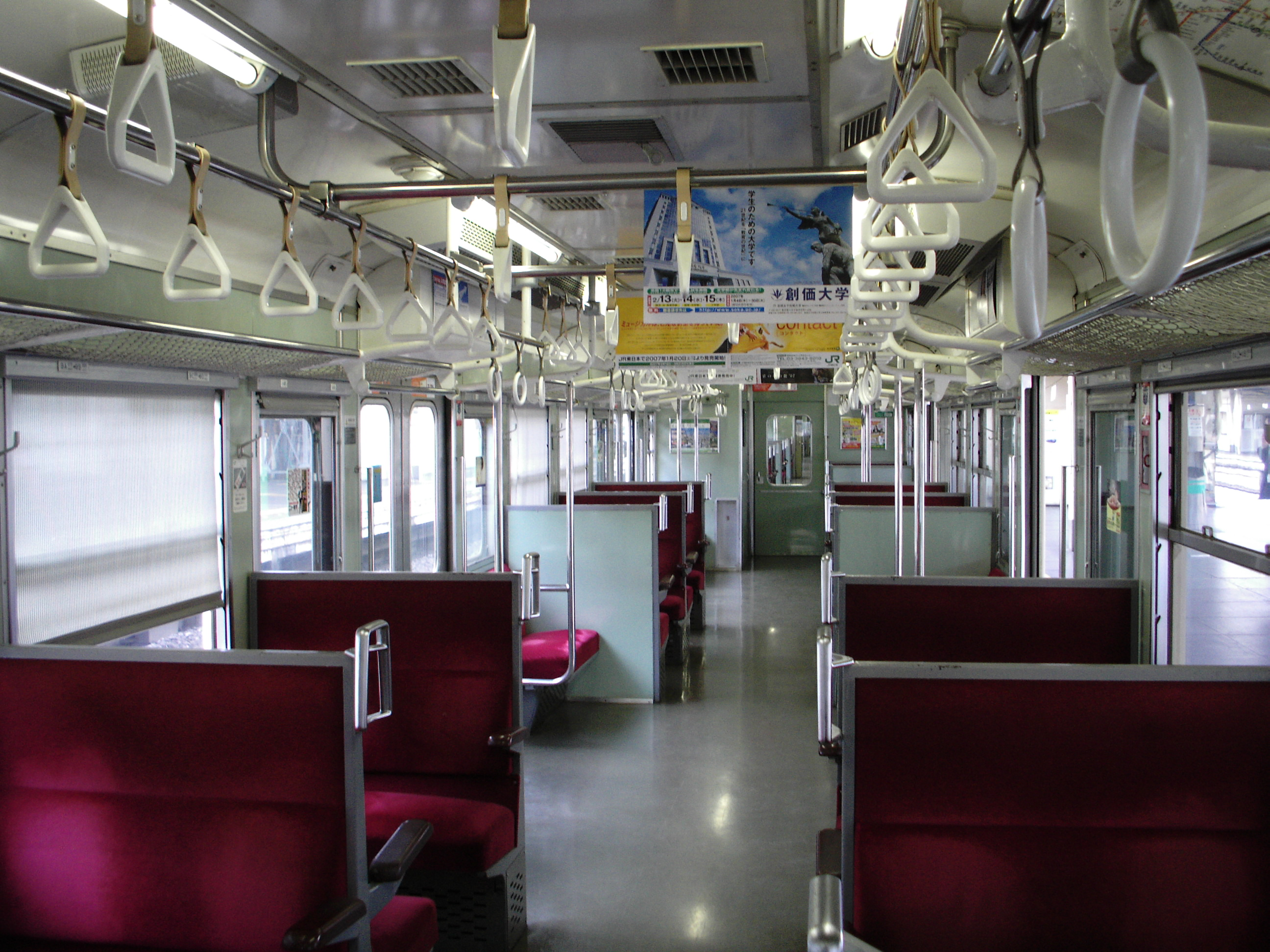
Interior of a 415-0 series trainset

== 415-100 series ==
This subseries was introduced in 1978, and most of the trains are operated by JR Kyushu, although a few trainsets were operated by JR East on the Jōban Line (the latter were withdrawn in March 2007, again in favour of the E531 series trains). The 415-100 series trainsets were built in the same exterior style as the 113-2000 series trains, but the seat pitch for transverse seating was increased from 1,420 mm to 1,490 mm, and toilets were fitted only in the KuHa 411-200 cars.

=== Kyushu ===
The first 415-100 series sets allocated to Kyushu were 4-car units delivered from September 1978. These were formed KuHa 411-100 + MoHa 415-100 + MoHa 414-100 + KuHa 411-200. Some sets later received life-extension refurbishment with transverse seating replaced by longitudinal seating.

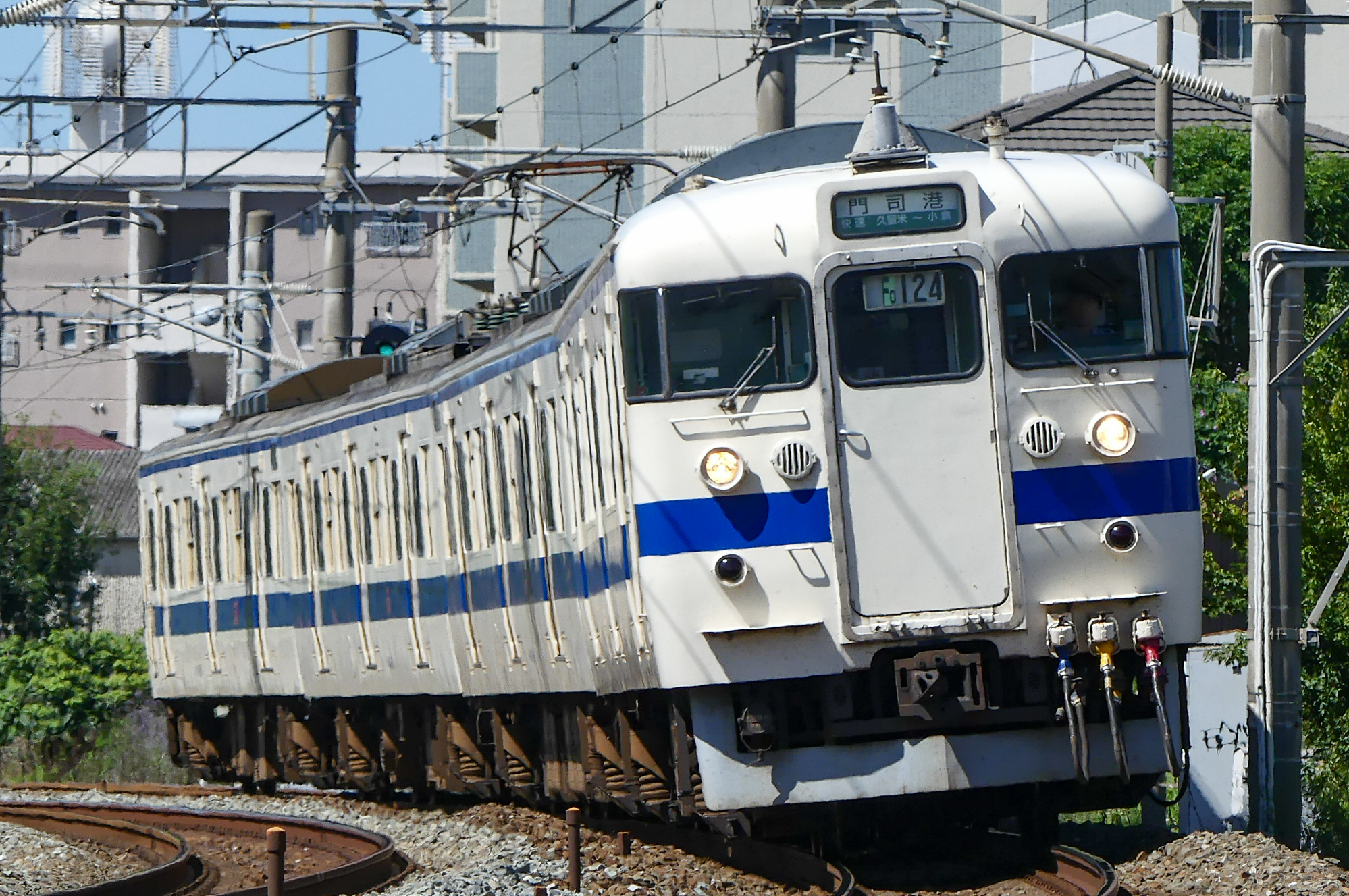
JR Kyushu 415-100 series in August 2017

== 415-500 series ==
The 415-500 sub-series was introduced from January 1982 on the Jōban Line, based at Katsuta Depot. These units had all longitudinal seating. Five 4-car sets were transferred to Minami-Fukuoka Depot in 1987 for use on Kagoshima Main Line duties, but these were all transferred to Kagoshima Depot by March 2007. A further two 4-car sets were transferred from JR East to JR Kyushu, entering service in March 2009.

After serving for more than a decade in service, the remaining cars in this subseries were retired following the timetable revision on 23 September 2022.

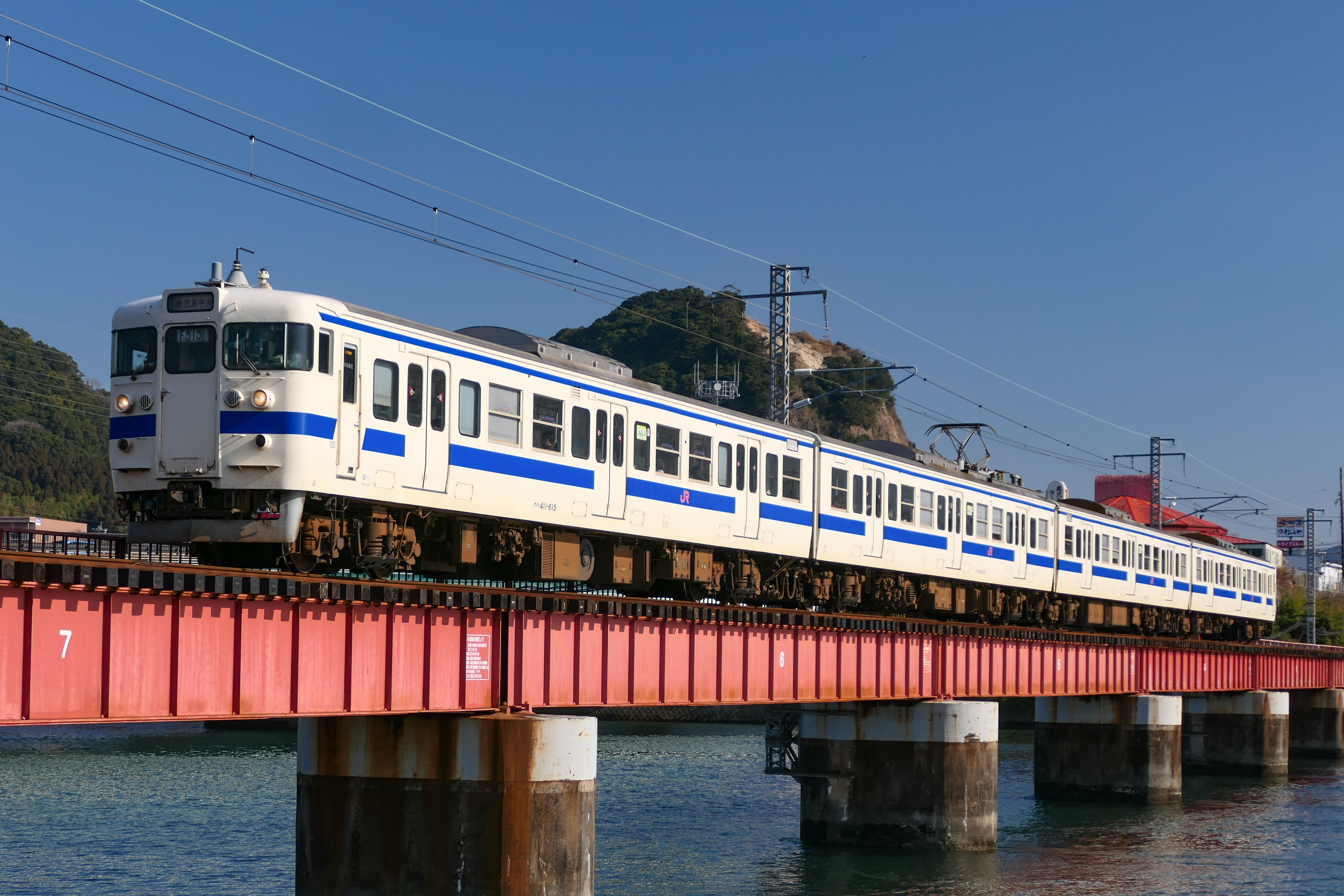
JR Kyushu 415-500 series in January 2022

== 415-700 series ==
Only seven cars were manufactured, and from 1985 to 2007 was operated as part of the 7+4+4-car formations on the Jōban Line. It was withdrawn in March 2007 and scrapped in July 2008.

== 415-800 series ==
Introduced by JR-West in 1991 for service on the Nanao Line and the IR Ishikawa Railway Line. The 415-800 series trainsets are based on the 113-800 series trains.

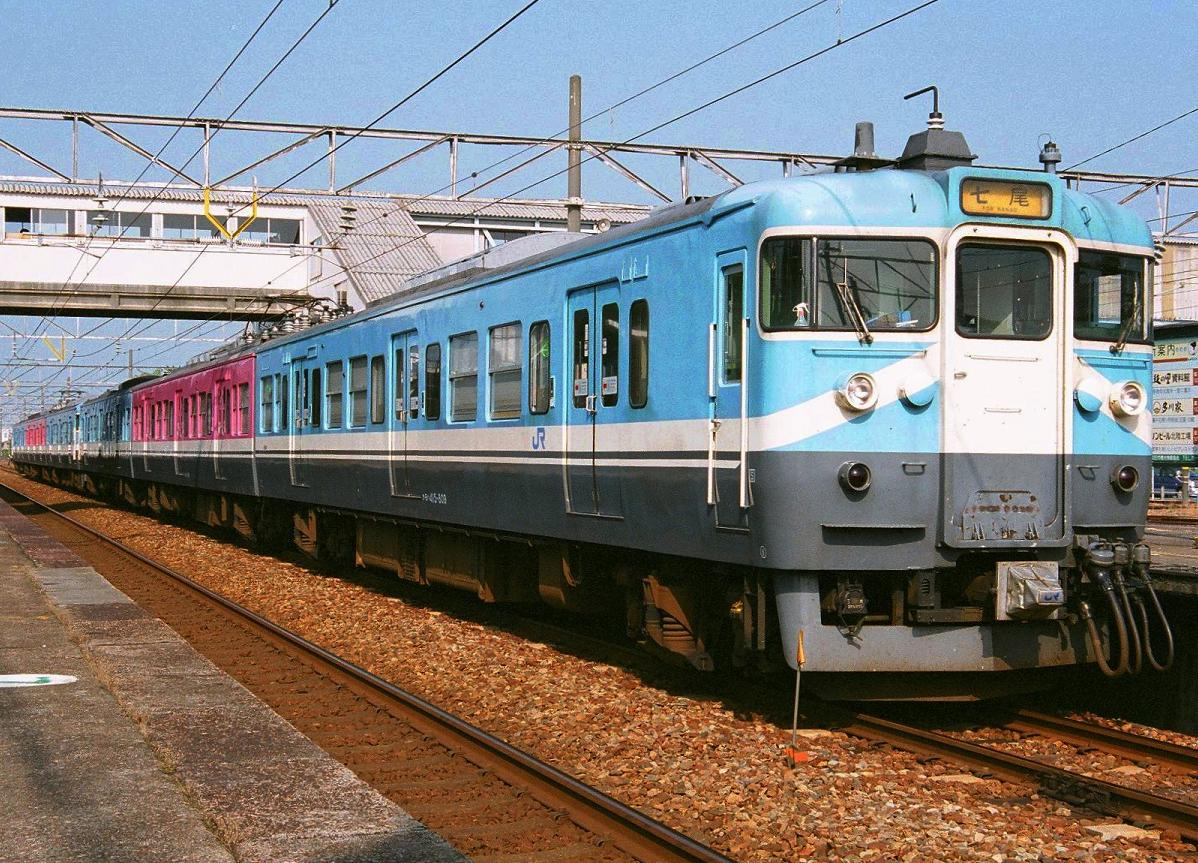
JR-West 415-800 series, July 2004

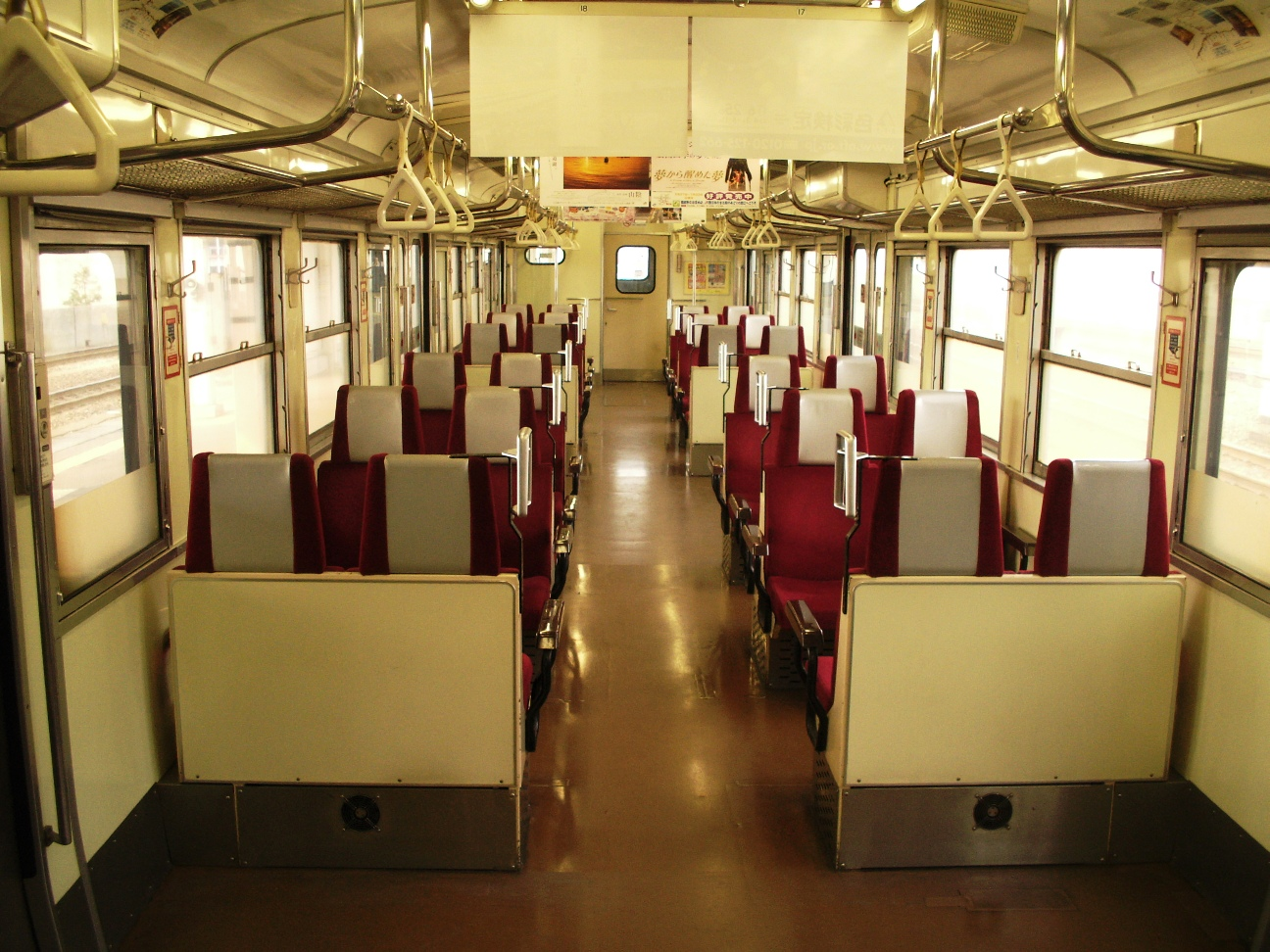
Interior of a 415-800 series trainset

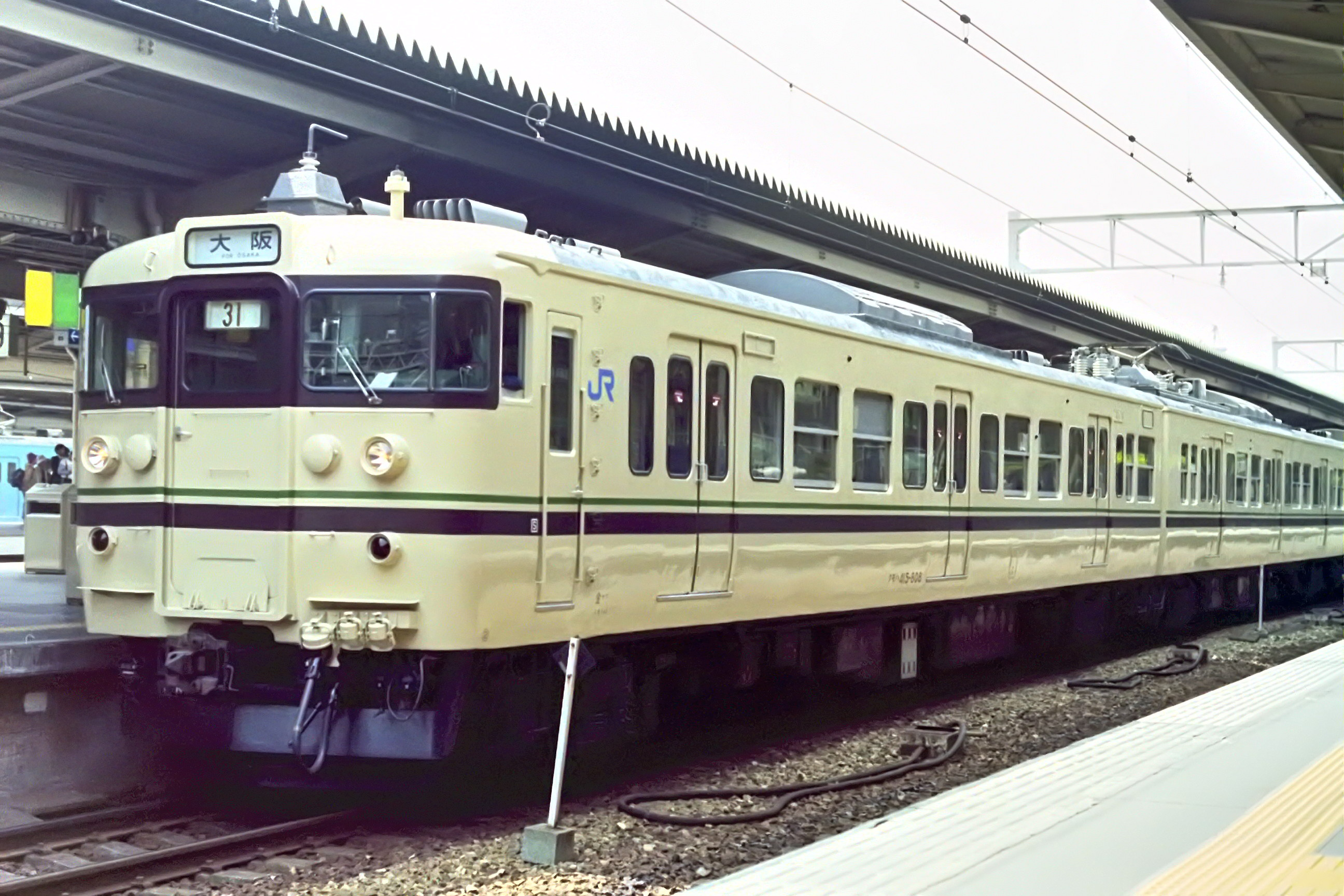
Fukuchiyama Line livery, Used on the Fukuchiyama Line from 1991

== 415-1500 series ==
Introduced in February 1986, the stainless steel bodies 415-1500 series trainsets look externally similar to the 211 and 213 series trains, and can be operated in 4- or 7+4+4-car formations (Jōban Line only). These trains can be coupled with the 415-500 and 415-700 series trains, and are lighter than previous variants.

An experimental bi-level cab car was built by Nippon Sharyo in 1991. The car, designated as Kuha 415-1901, had a capacity of 156 passengers. It was scrapped in 2006.

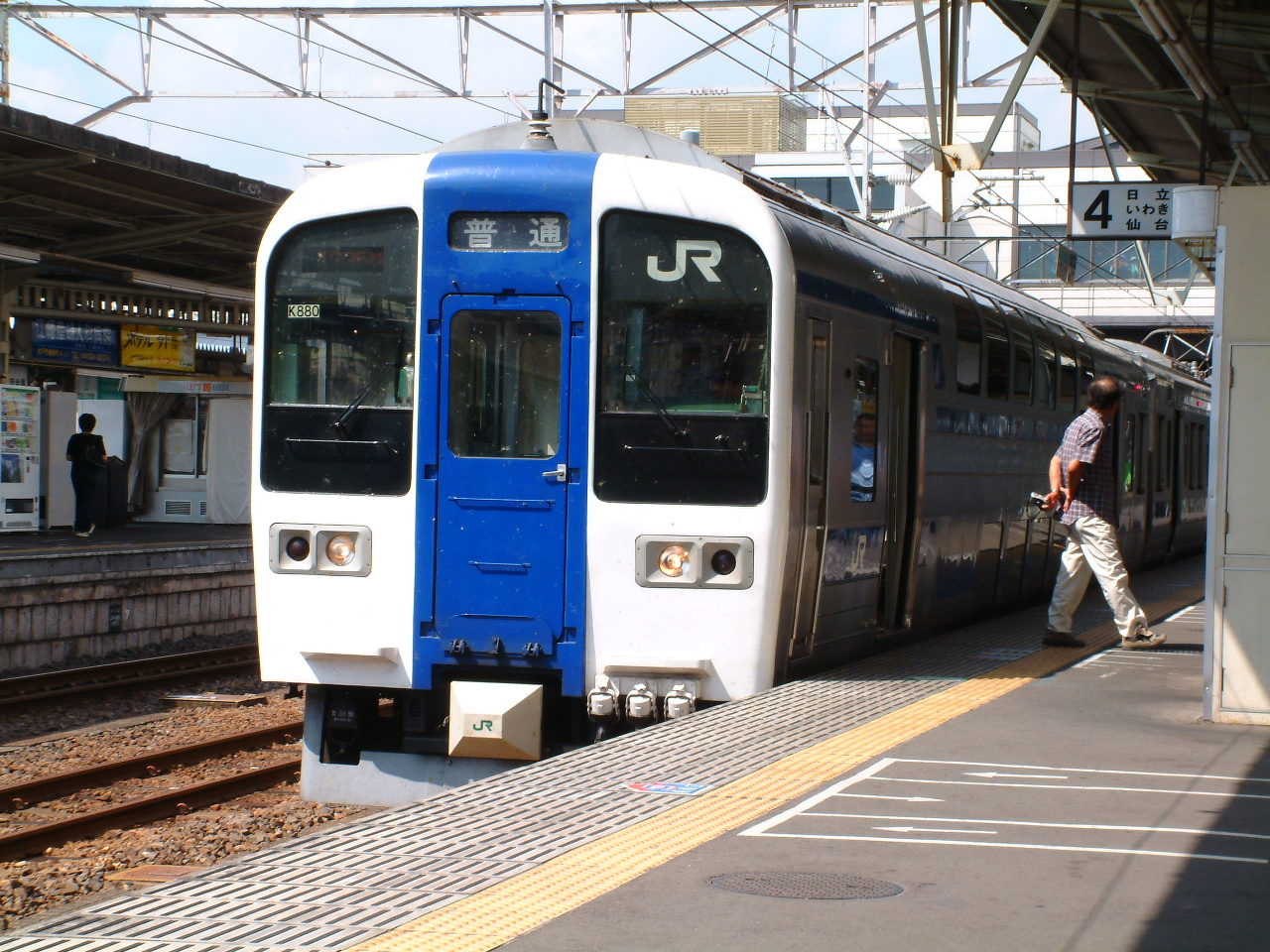
Experimental double-deck car KuHa 415-1901, August 2002

=== Kyushu ===
12 4-car 415-1500 series sets (F1510 - F1521) were delivered to Kyushu between September 1986 and February 1987. Set F1501 was also later transferred from JR East to JR Kyushu in 2009, allocated first to Minami-Fukuoka Depot, and later to Mojiko Depot (from March 2012).

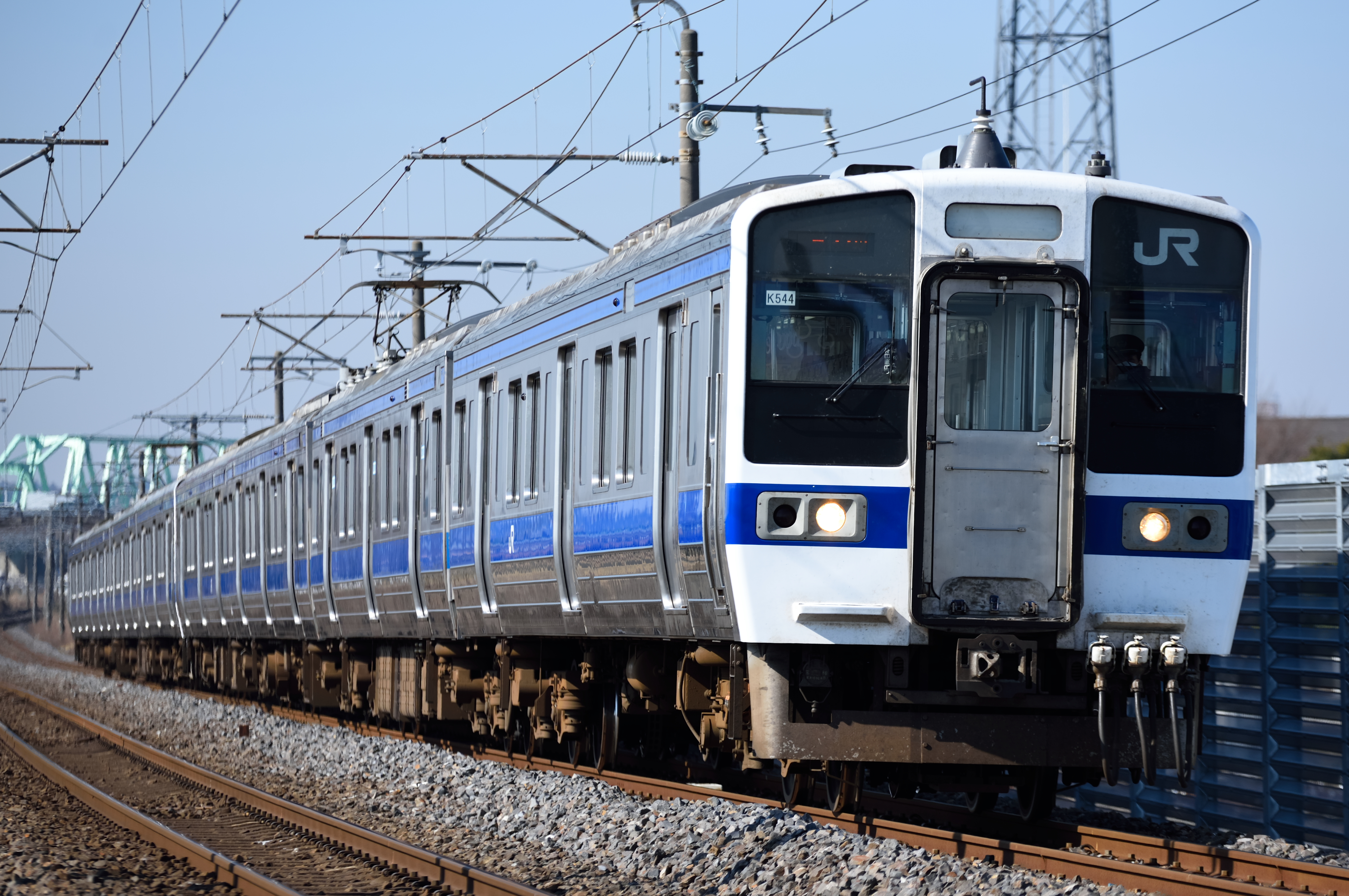
JR East 415-1500 series in March 2016

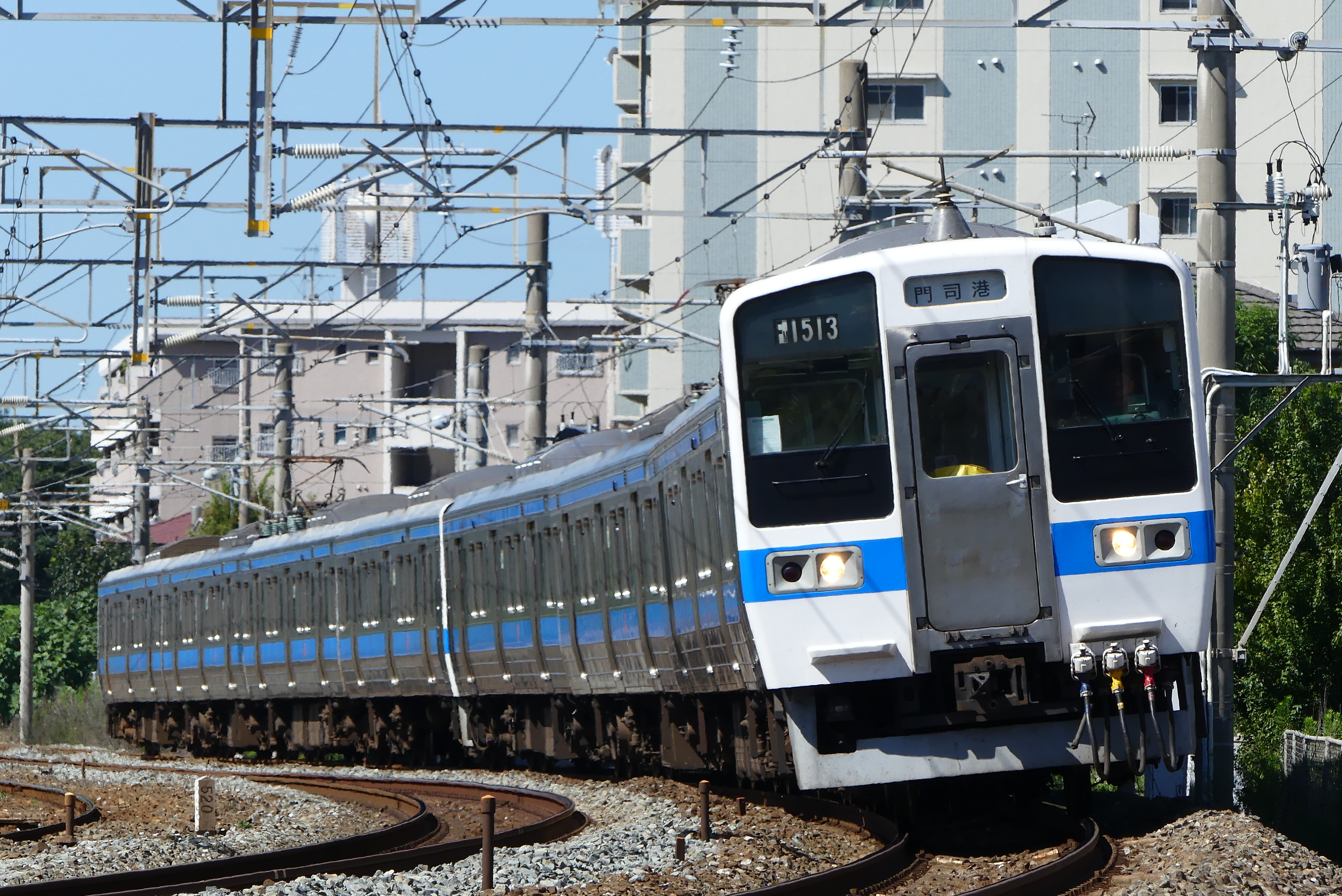
JR Kyushu 415-1500 series in August 2017
