= 811 series =

Japanese train type

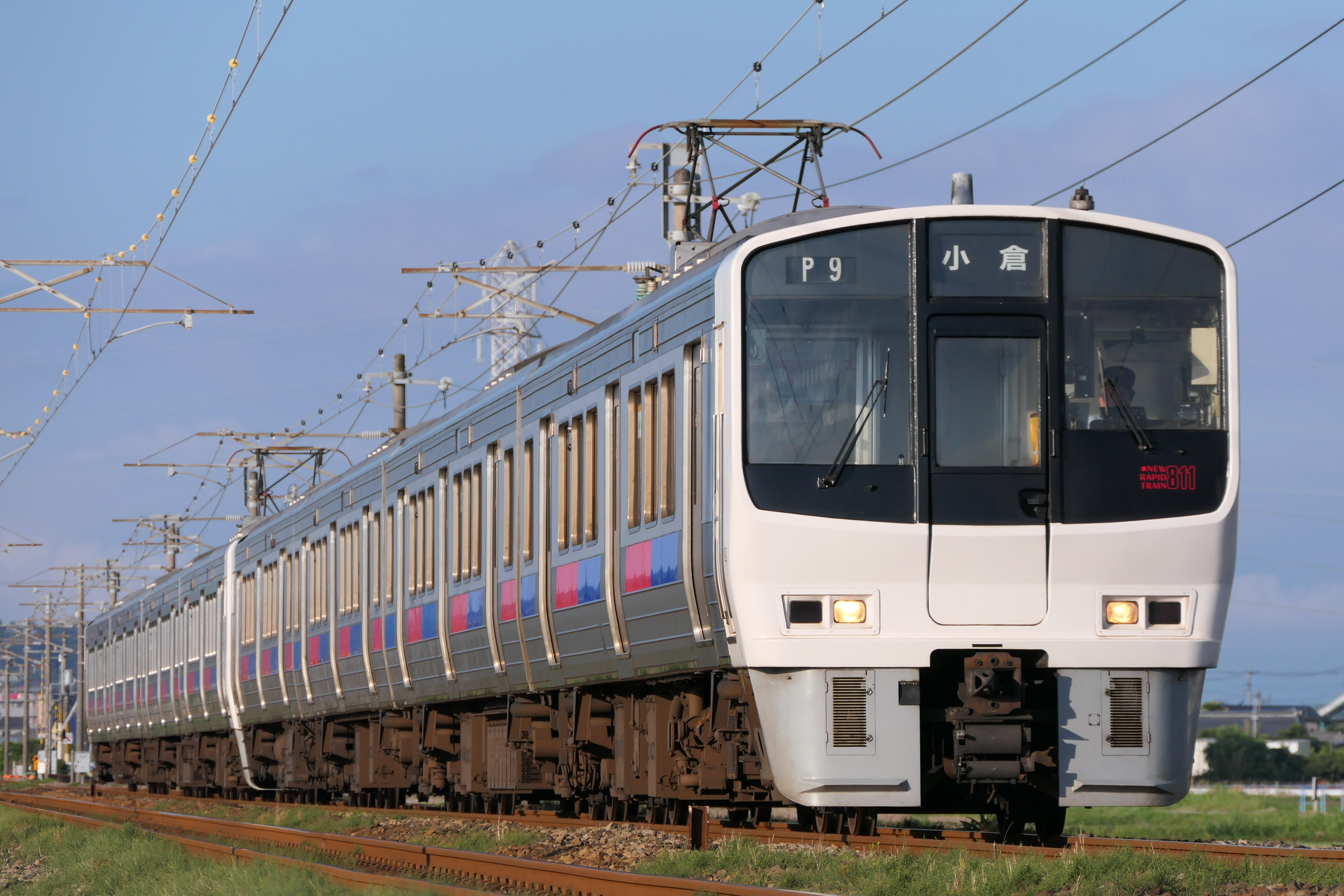
- An 811-0 series set in June 2019
- Manufacturers: Hitachi, Kinki Sharyo, JR Kyushu
- Replaced: 421 series
- Constructed: 1989–1993
- Entered service: 21 July 1989
- Refurbished: 2017–
- Number built: 112 vehicles (28 sets)
- Number in service: 108 vehicles (27 sets)
- Number scrapped: 4 vehicles (set PM2, accident damage)
- Formation: 4 cars per trainset
- Operator: JR Kyushu
- Depot: Minami-Fukuoka
- Lines served: Kagoshima Main Line, Nagasaki Main Line, Nippo Main Line

Specifications
- Car body construction: Stainless steel
- Car length: 20,000 mm (65 ft 7 in)
- Width: 2,950 mm (9 ft 8 in)
- Height: 3,670 mm (12 ft 0 in)
- Doors: 3 pairs per side
- Maximum speed: 120 km/h (75 mph)
- Traction system: Thyristor drive Variable frequency (IGBT/SiC Hybrid module) (811-1500 series)
- Traction motors: 811-0/100 series: MT61QA 811-1500 series MT405K
- Electric system: 20 kV AC 60 Hz
- Current collection: Overhead catenary
- Multiple working: 813/815/817/821 series
- Track gauge: 1,067 mm (3 ft 6 in)

The 811 series (811系) is an AC electric multiple unit (EMU) train type operated on local services by Kyushu Railway Company (JR Kyushu) in Japan since 1989.

== Variants ==
- 811-0 series: 16 x 4-car sets (PM1–17)
- 811-100 series: 11 x 4-car sets (PM101–111)
- 811-1500 series: Refurbished 4-car sets (PM15xx)

== Design ==
The trains were built jointly by Hitachi, Kinki Sharyo, and JR Kyushu (Kokura factory).

== Operations ==
811 series trains are used on "Local" (all-stations) and "Rapid" (limited-stop) services on the following lines.

- Kagoshima Main Line
- Nagasaki Main Line
- Nippo Main Line

== Formations ==
As of 1 October 2017, the fleet consists of 108 vehicles, formed as 27 four-car sets.

=== 811-0 series ===
The four-car 811-0 series sets (sets PM1 to PM17) are formed as follows.

Designation	M'c	M	T	Tc'
Numbering	KuMoHa 810	MoHa 811	SaHa 811	KuHa 810
Capacity (Seated/total)	48/124	56/133		44/123

The KuMoHa 810 car is fitted with one PS101Q lozenge-type pantograph. The KuHa 810 car has a toilet.

=== 811-100 series ===
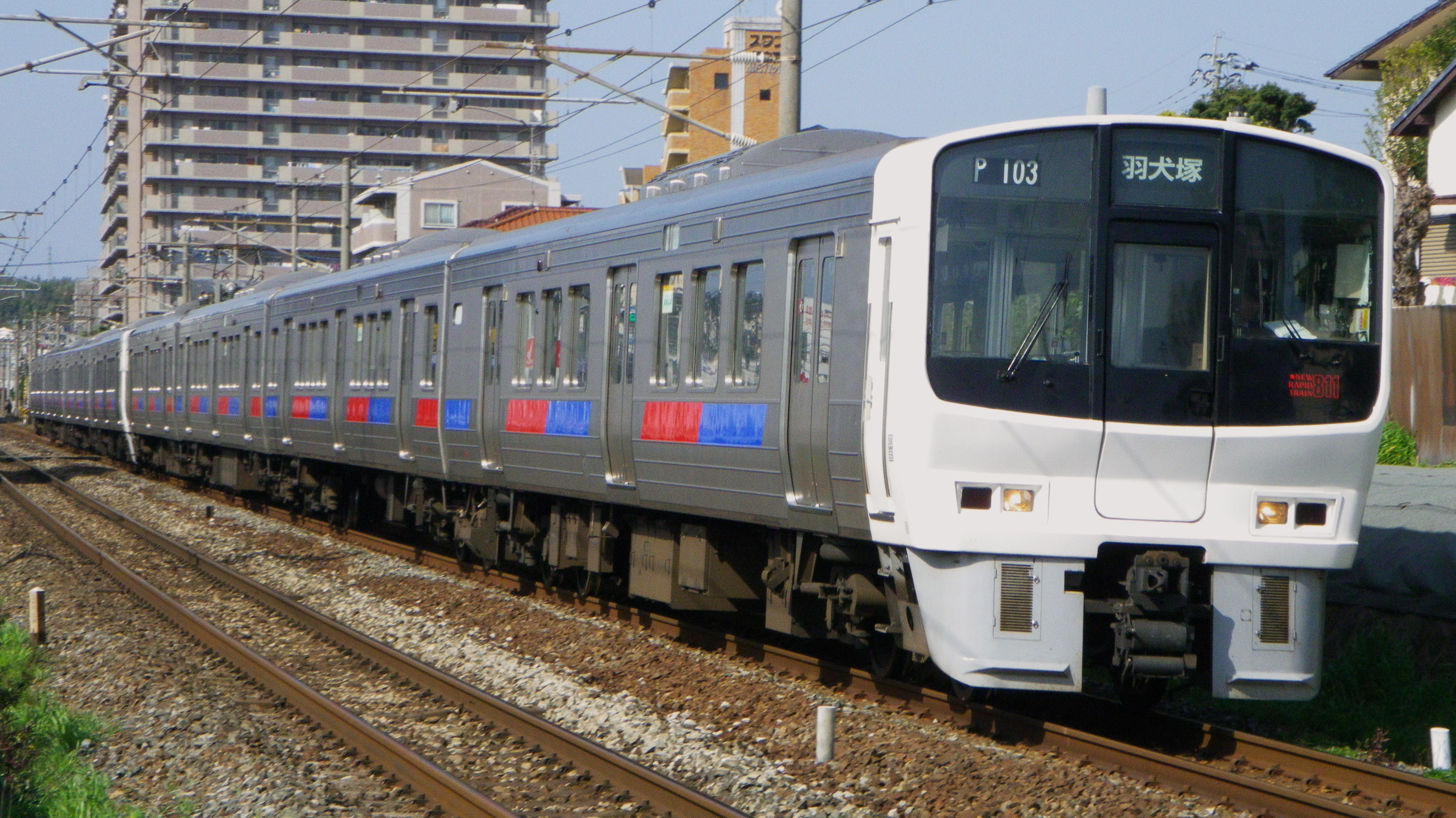
811-100 series set PM103 in March 2010

The four-car 811-100 series sets (sets PM101 to PM111) are formed as follows.

Designation	M'c	M	T	Tc'
Numbering	KuMoHa 810-1xx	MoHa 811-1xx	SaHa 811-1xx	KuHa 810-1xx
Capacity (Seated/total)	48/133	56/141		44/131

The KuMoHa 810 car is fitted with one PS101Q lozenge-type pantograph. The KuHa 810 car has a toilet. Sets PM105 and PM106 have SaHa 811-200 cars instead of SaHa 811-100 cars. These also have a toilet.

=== 811-1500 series ===
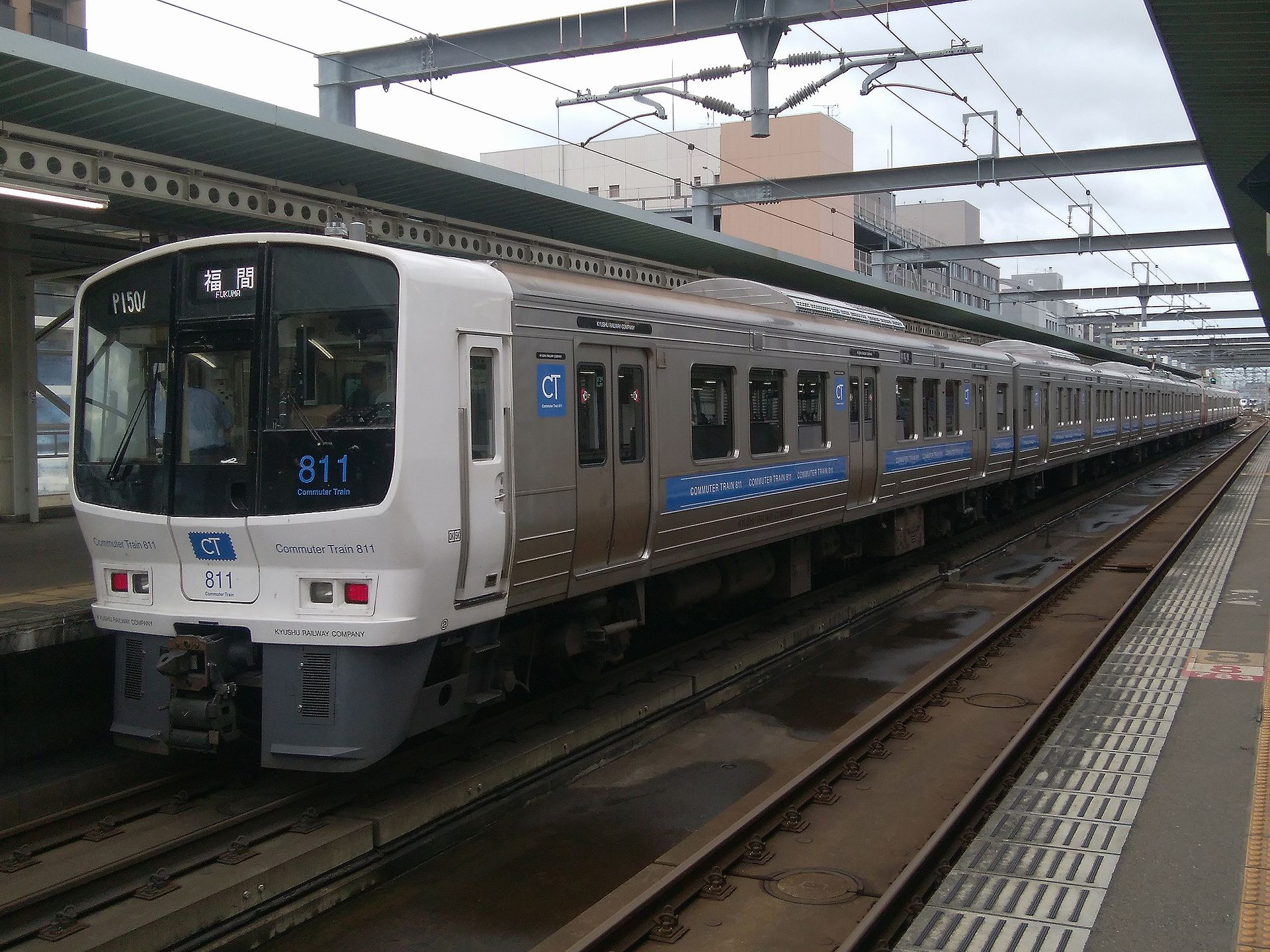
Refurbished 811-1500 series set PM1504 in September 2017

The four-car 811-1500 series sets (sets PM15xx) refurbished from former 811-0 series sets are formed as follows.

Designation	M'c	M	T	Tc'
Numbering	KuMoHa 810-15xx	MoHa 811-15xx	SaHa 811-15xx	KuHa 810-15xx

The KuMoHa 810 car is fitted with one single-arm pantograph. The KuHa 810 car has a toilet.

== Interior ==
The 811-100 series sets have fixed transverse seats in the vicinity of the doorways rather than the flip-over seats of the 811-0 series sets.

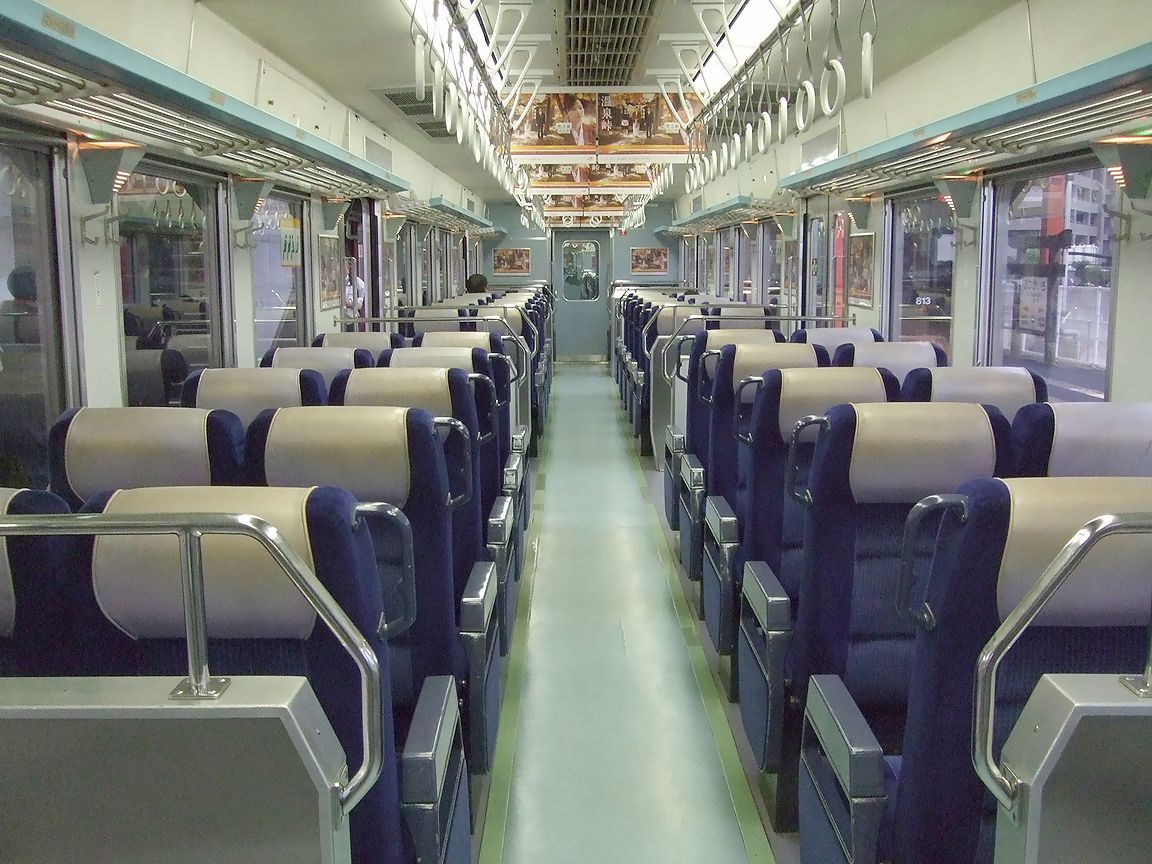
The interior of 811-0 series set PM11 in November 2008

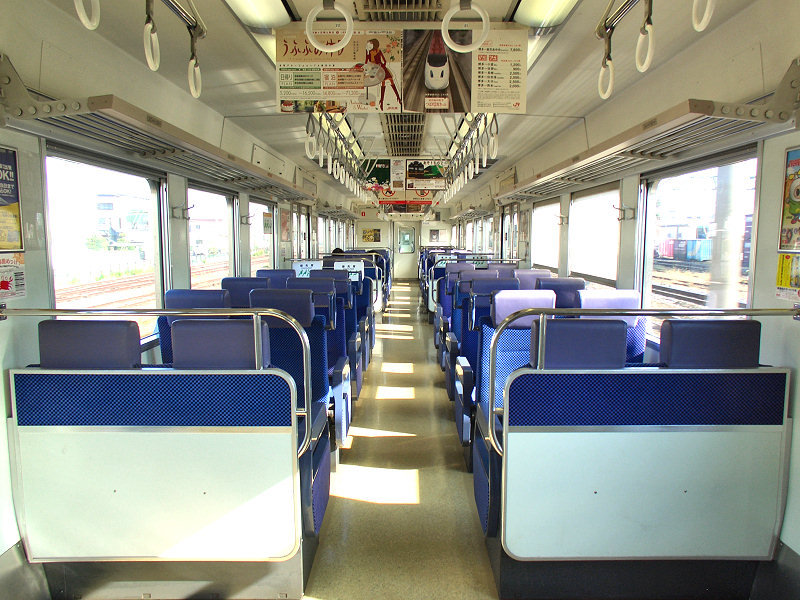
The interior of 811-100 series car KuHa 810-106 of set PM106 in November 2006

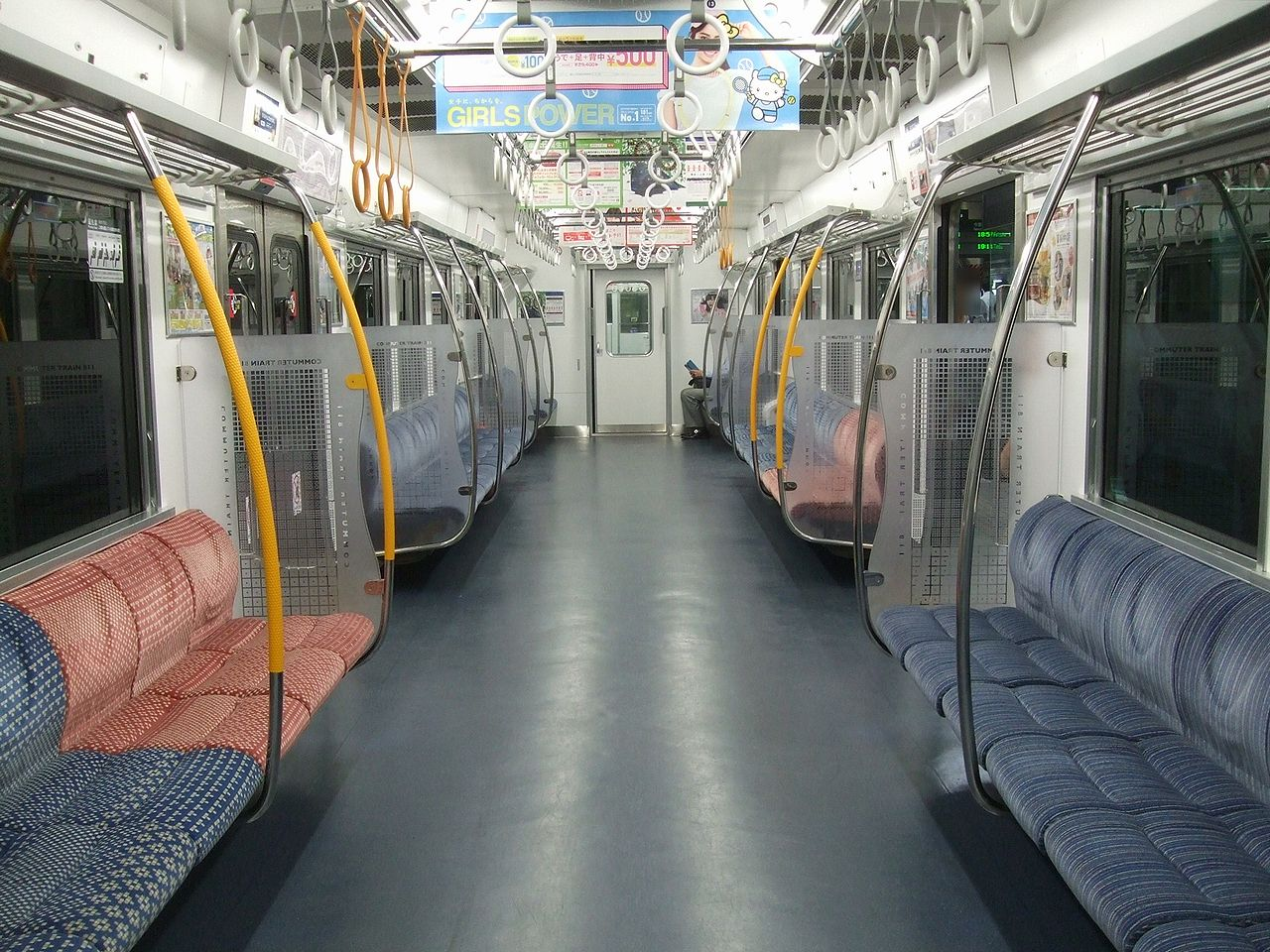
The interior of refurbished 811-1500 series car MoHa 811-1504 of set PM1504 in September 2017

== Livery variations ==
Sets P8 and P9 carried a "Mitsui Greenland" promotional livery, and set P11 carried a "Space World" promotional livery for a while. As of January 2013, P8 carries promotional vinyls for the Kyushu Heritage Museum, and the other two sets have been returned to the standard colour scheme.

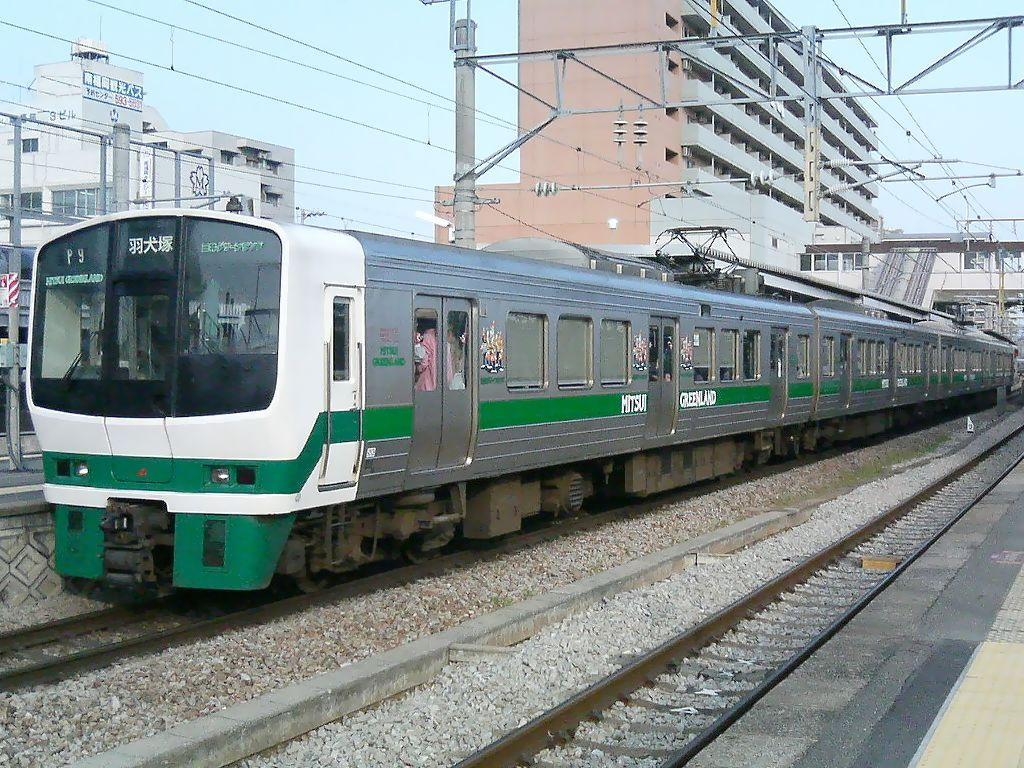
Set P9 in Mitsui Greenland livery in April 2006

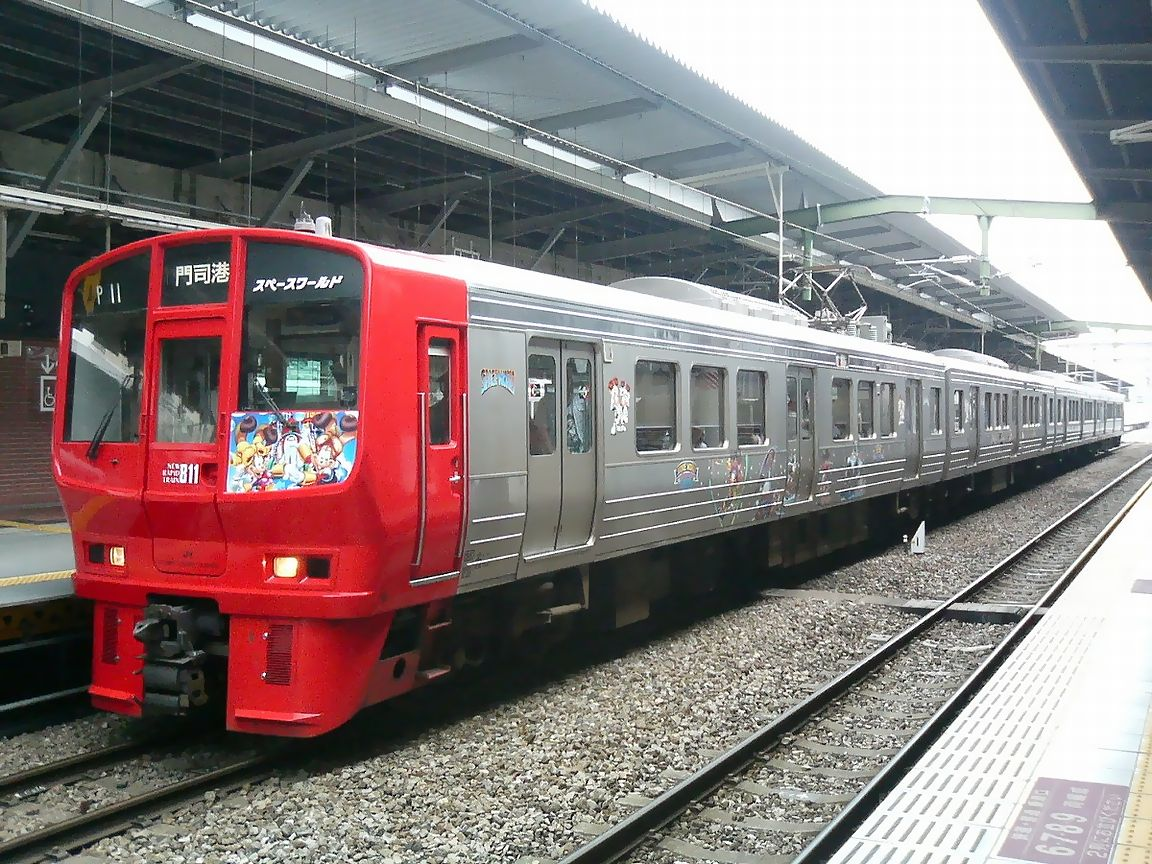
Set P11 in Space World livery in September 2006

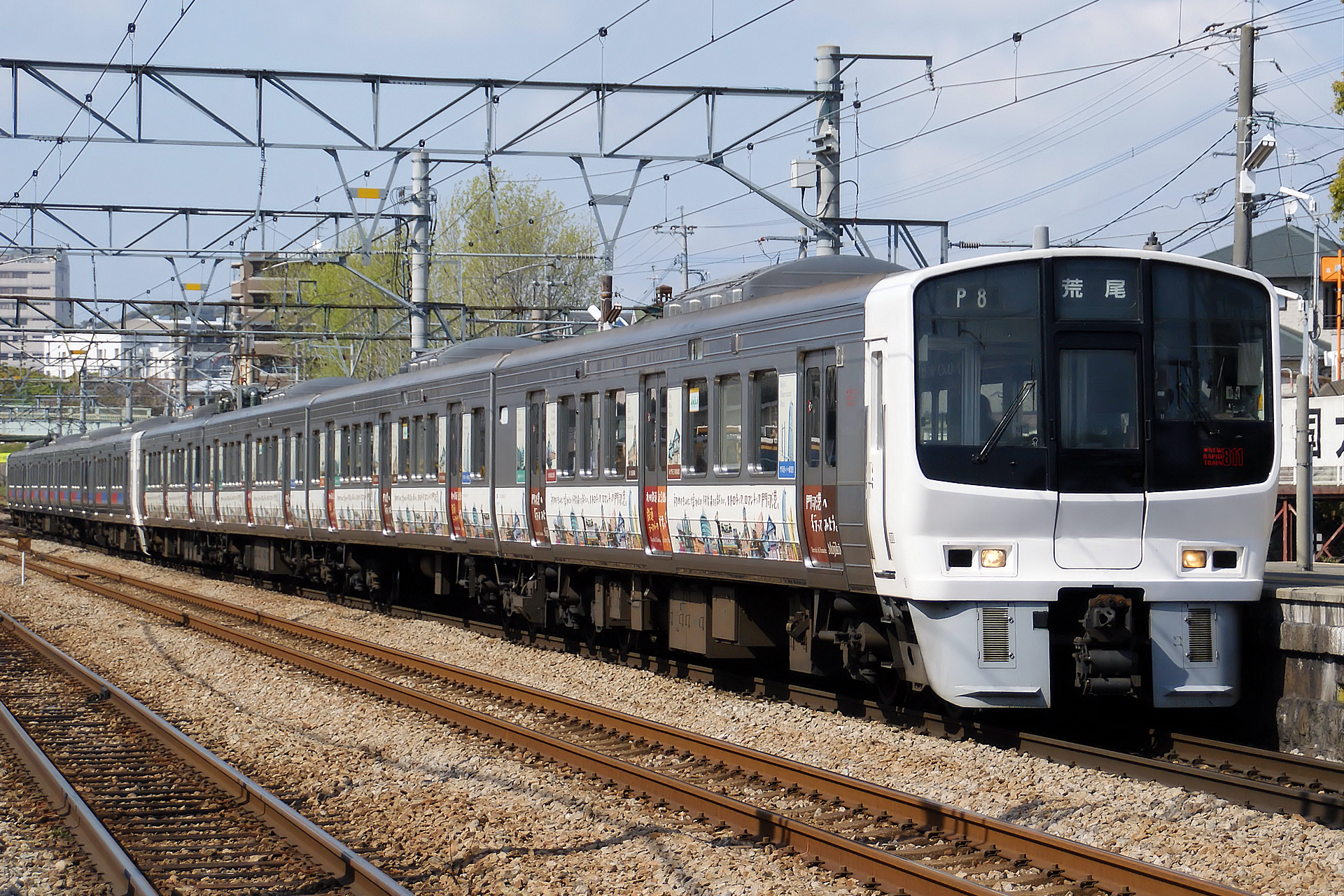
Set P8 in promotional livery in April 2011

== History ==
The first sets were delivered in June 1989, and entered service from 21 July 1989. Trains became all no-smoking from 1 September 1995.

11 811-100 series four-car sets were delivered from 1992, numbered PM101 to PM111. These had a modified seating arrangement to provide more standing space in the doorway areas.

=== Refurbishment ===
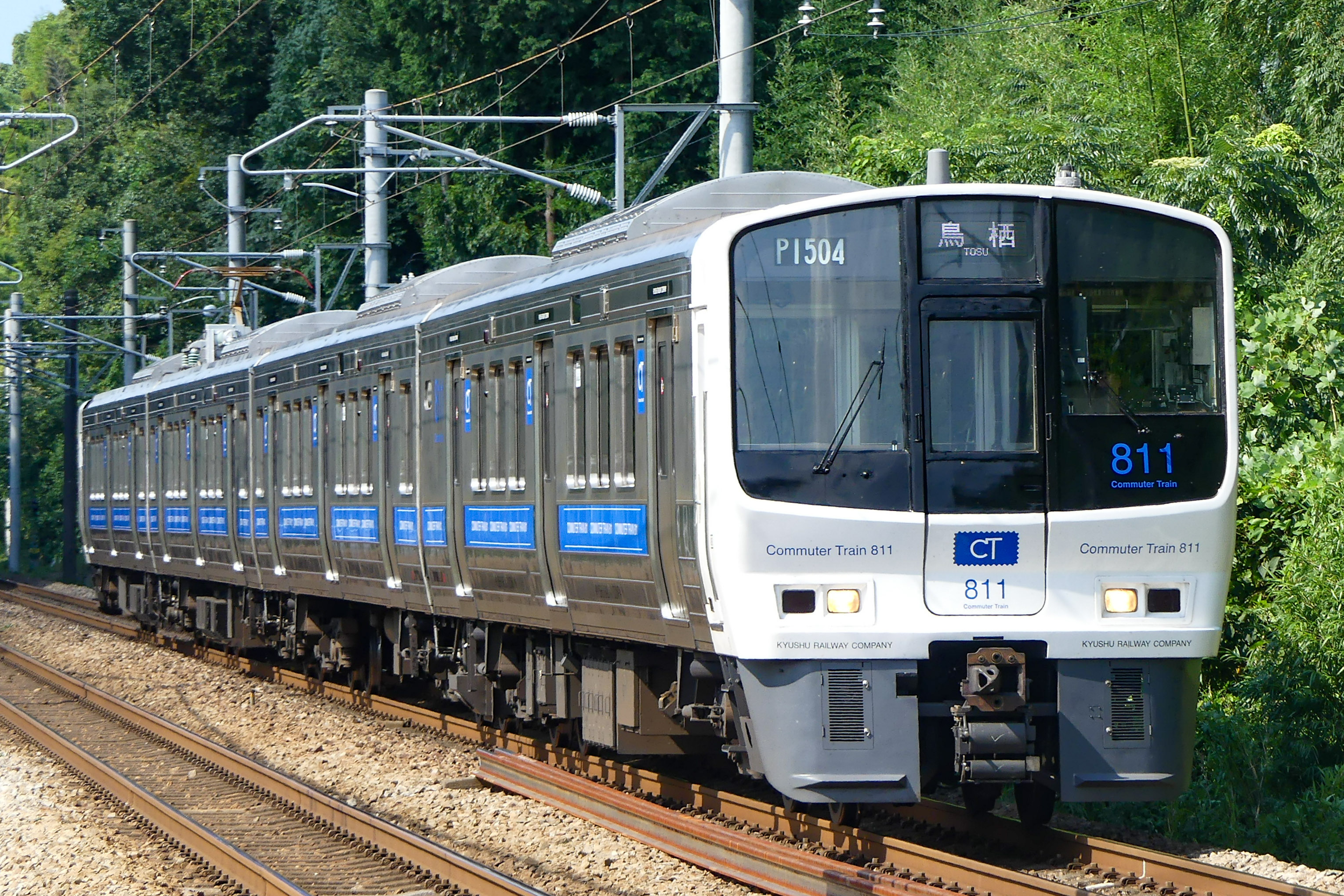
Refurbished set PM1504 in August 2017

In 2017, set PM4 was refurbished, renumbered as set PM1504. Refurbishment changes include replacing the traction control equipment with SiC-VVVF equipment, changing to a single-arm pantograph, tinted passenger windows, full-colour LED destination indicators, and replacement of the former transverse seating with longitudinal bench seating. The interior and exterior design for refurbished trainsets was overseen by the industrial design company Don Design Associates. The first refurbished trainset returned to service in April 2017.
