= 821 series =

Japanese electric multiple unit train type

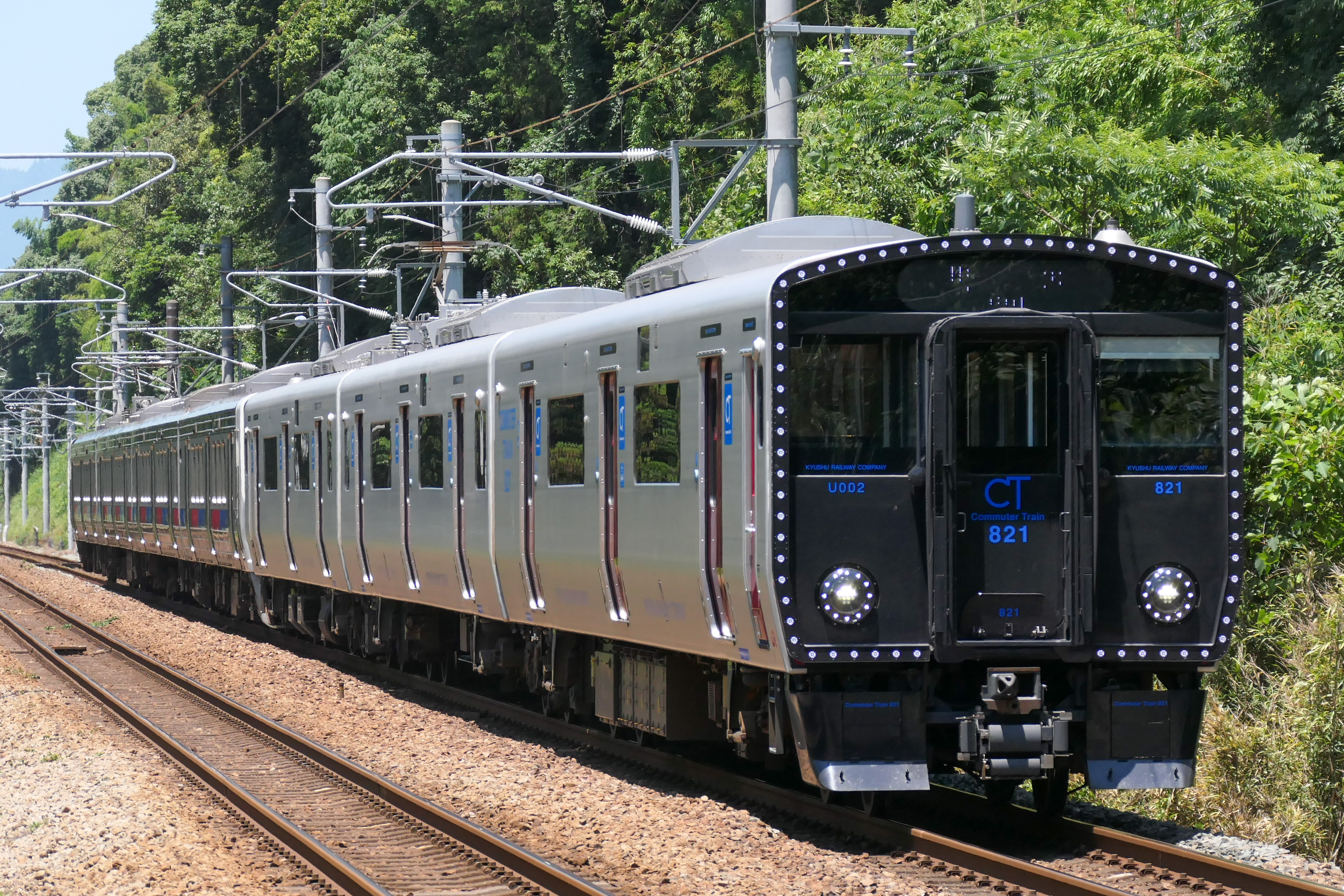
- Set U002 in June 2019
- In service: March 2019 – Present
- Manufacturer: Hitachi
- Built at: Kudamatsu, Yamaguchi
- Constructed: 2018–2022
- Entered service: 16 March 2019
- Number built: 21 vehicles (7 sets)
- Formation: 3 cars per trainset
- Fleet numbers: U001-
- Operator: JR Kyushu
- Line served: Kagoshima Main Line

Specifications
- Doors: 3 pairs per side
- Maximum speed: 120 km/h (75 mph) (design speed)
- Traction system: Variable frequency (SiC-MOSFET)
- Electric system: 20 kV 60 Hz AC (overhead catenary)
- Current collection: Pantograph
- Multiple working: 811 series
- Track gauge: 1,067 mm (3 ft 6 in)

The 821 series (821系) is an AC electric multiple unit (EMU) train type operated by Kyushu Railway Company (JR Kyushu) in Japan since March 2019. Two three-car trains were delivered in February 2018 for testing in preparation for full production and entry into revenue service. There are currently 7 three-car trains in service.

== Formation ==
The 821 series trains are formed as three-car sets as follows.

Designation	Mc	T	Tc
Numbering	KuMoHa 821	SaHa 822	KuHa 821

- The KuMoHa 821 car is equipped with one single-arm pantograph.
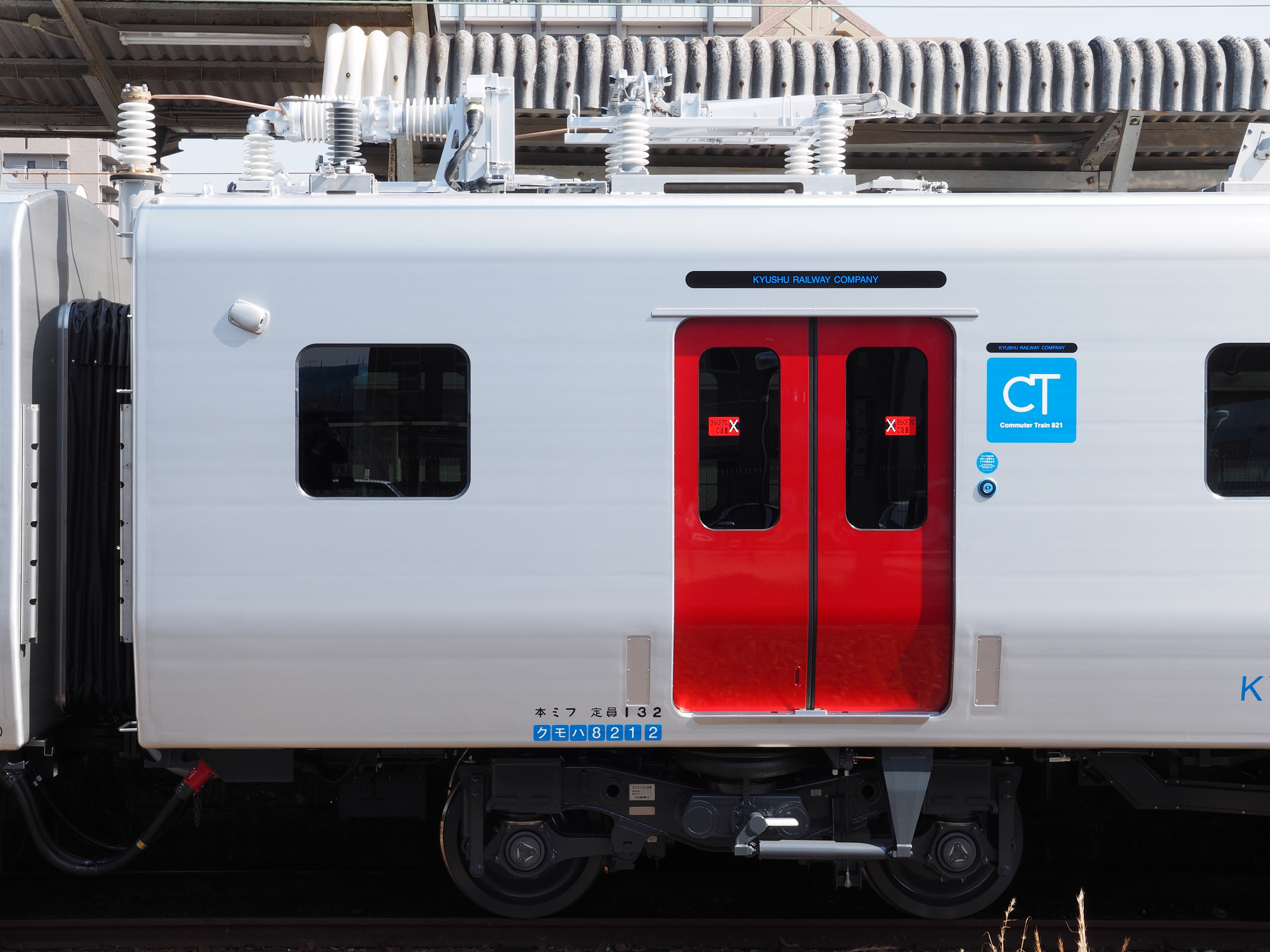
The pantograph end of driving car KuMoHa 821-2

== History ==
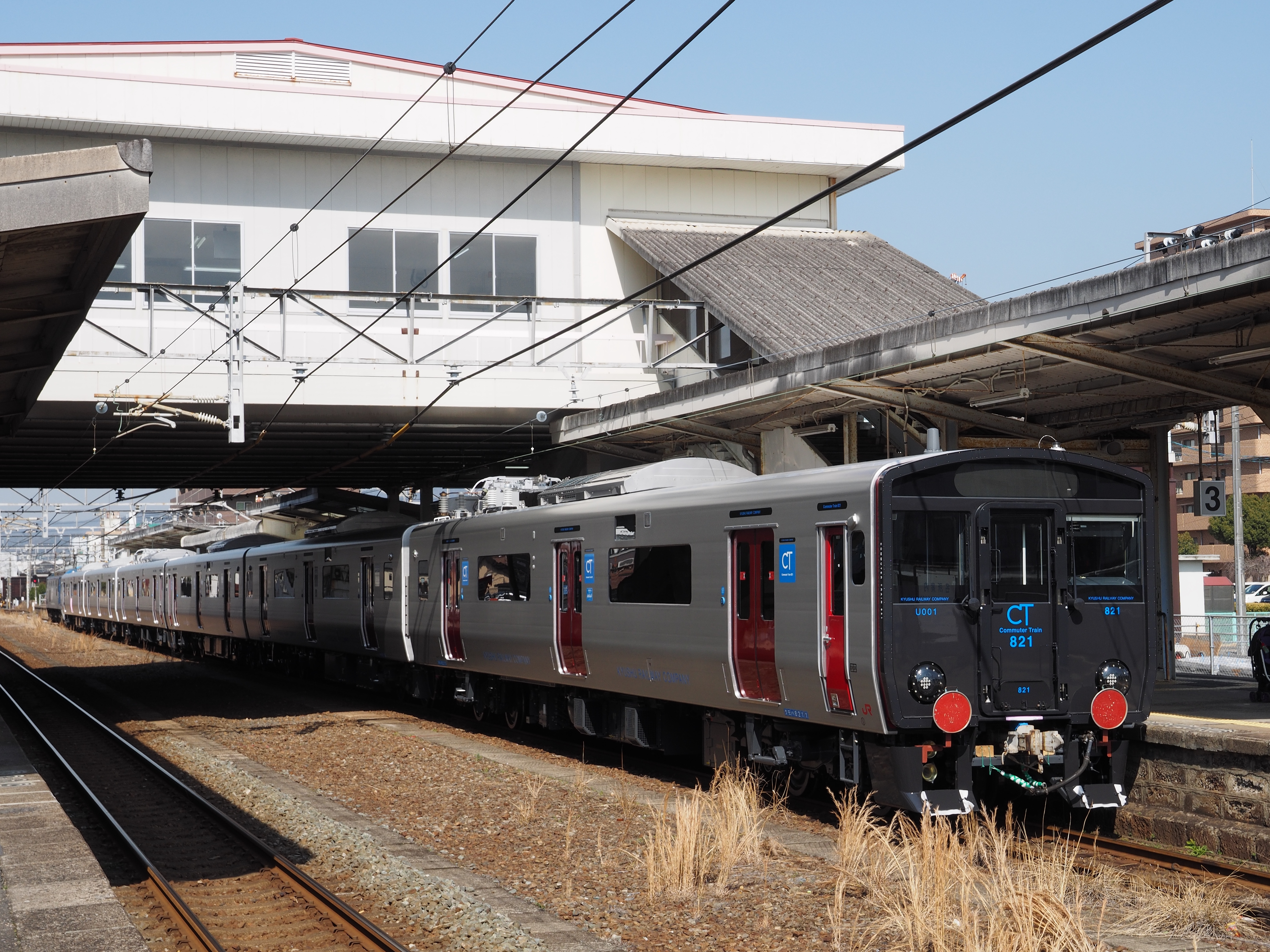
Sets U001 and U002 on delivery in February 2018

Details of the trains on order were officially announced by JR Kyushu in January 2018. Two three-car trains were delivered in February 2018 from the Hitachi factory in Kudamatsu, Yamaguchi.

The trains first entered revenue service on 16 March 2019 on the Kagoshima Main Line.
