= 813 series =

Japanese train type

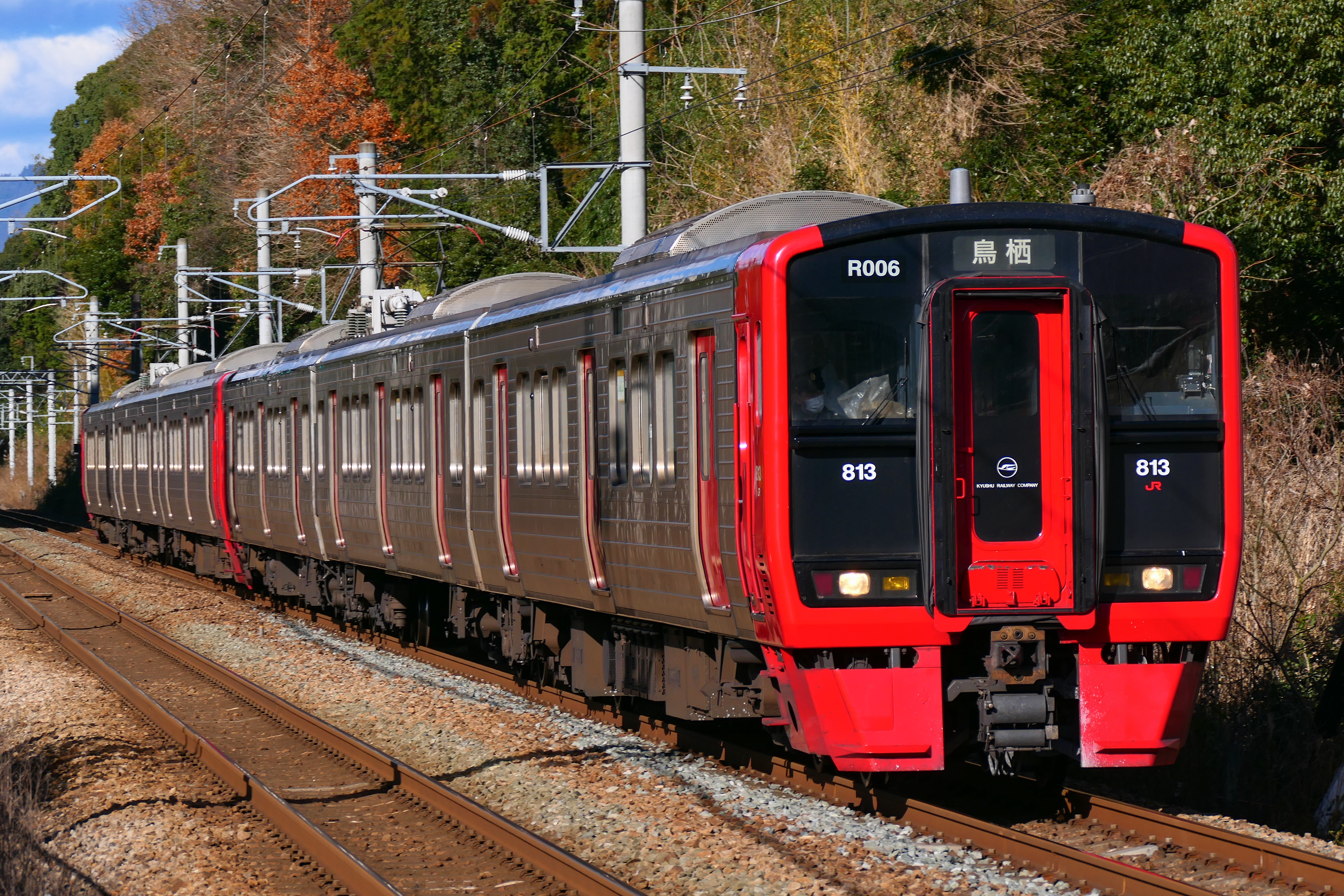
- An 813-0 series set in January 2023
- In service: March 1994–Present
- Manufacturers: JR Kyushu, Kinki Sharyo
- Replaced: 415 series, 421 series, 423 series, 475 series, 715 series
- Constructed: 1994–2010
- Number built: 254 vehicles (85 sets)
- Number in service: 246 vehicles (82 sets)
- Number scrapped: 8 vehicles (3 sets, accident damage)
- Formation: 2 cars per trainset (until 2003); 3 cars per trainset
- Operator: JR Kyushu
- Depots: Minami-Fukuoka, Nōgata

Specifications
- Car body construction: Stainless steel
- Car length: 20,000 mm (65 ft 7 in)
- Width: 2,985 mm (9 ft 9.5 in)
- Height: 4,031 mm (13 ft 2.7 in)
- Floor height: 1,125 mm (3 ft 8.3 in)
- Doors: 3 pairs per side
- Maximum speed: 120 km/h (75 mph)
- Traction system: Thyristor drive + Variable frequency (GTO) (813-0/100/200/300 series); Variable frequency (IGBT) (813-1000/1100 series)
- Electric system: 20 kV 60 Hz AC (overhead catenary)
- Current collection: Pantograph
- Multiple working: 811/815/817 series
- Track gauge: 1,067 mm (3 ft 6 in)

The 813 series (813系) is an AC electric multiple unit train type operated on local services by Kyushu Railway Company (JR Kyushu) in Japan since 1994.

== Design ==
The trains were built jointly by Kinki Sharyo and JR Kyushu (at its Kokura factory).

Originally, the trains featured transverse seating throughout. Beginning in November 2023, the 813 series fleet was retrofitted with longitudinal seating to alleviate congestion. JR Kyushu initially planned to install longitudinal seats in all sets by fiscal 2028, but this was later pulled forward to fiscal 2027.

== Variants ==
- 813-0 series: 9 x 3-car sets RM001 to RM009
- 813-100 series: 19 x 3-car sets RM101 to RM113, RG114 to RG119
- 813-200 series: 36 x 3-car sets RM201 to RM227, RG228, RM229 to RM236
- 813-300 series: 3 x 3-car sets RM301 to RM303
- 813-1000 series: 3 x 3-car sets RM1001 RG1002, RG1003
- 813-1100 series: 15 x 3-car sets RM1101 to RM1115

== 813-0 series ==
Nine sets (R001 to R009) were delivered to Minami-Fukuoka depot in 1994, originally as two-car sets, entering service from 1 March 1994.

From March 2003, new 10th-batch SaHa 813-400 centre cars were added to standardize the entire fleet as three-car sets.

These sets are normally used on the Kagoshima Main Line, Nippō Main Line, Nagasaki Main Line, and Sasebo Line.

Two-car set R008 was withdrawn together with R101 and R231 after sustaining damage in a head-on collision in February 2002.

=== Formation ===
Numbering	KuHa 813	SaHa 813-400	KuMoHa 813
Capacity (total/seated)	122/44)	142/52	124/48

The KuHa 813 car is fitted with one PS400K scissors-type pantograph, and has a toilet. The SaHa 813 car is fitted with a wheelchair space.

== 813-100 series ==
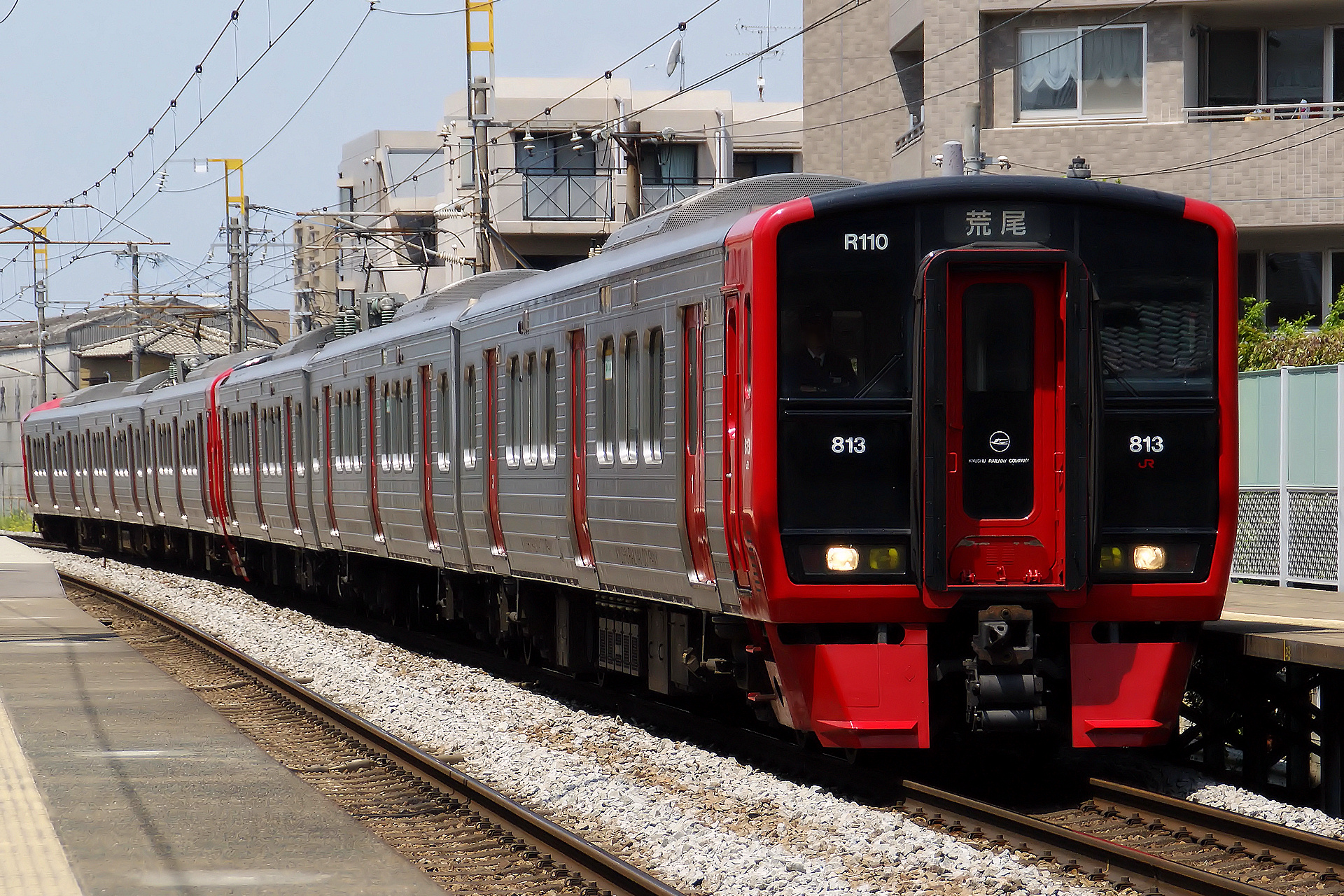
Minami-Fukuoka set R110 in April 2011

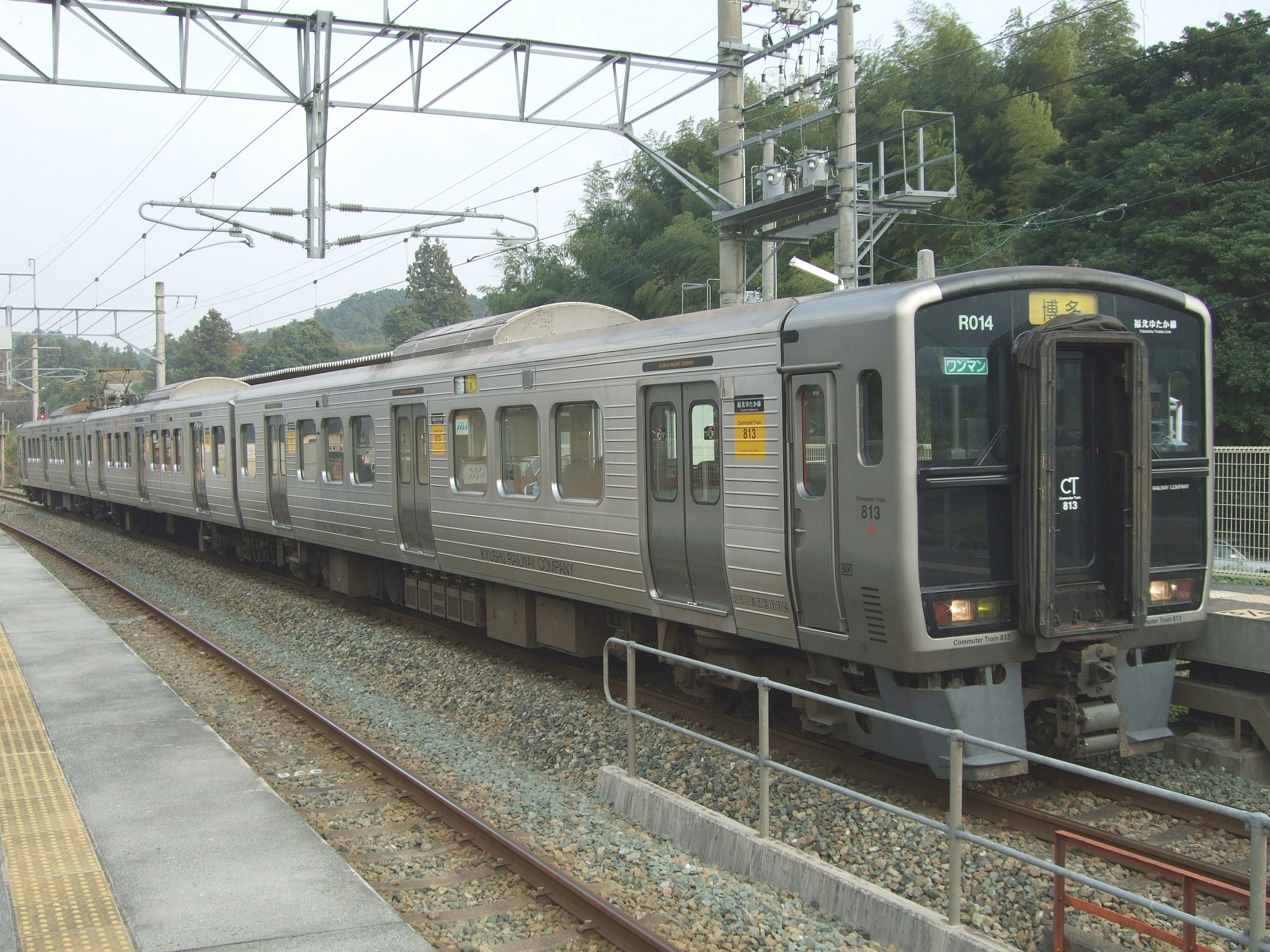
Fukuhoku Yutaka Line 813-100 series set R014 in November 2007

Thirteen 2nd-batch 813-100 series three-car sets (R101 to R113) were delivered to Minami-Fukuoka depot between January 1995 and March 1996. Six two-car sets (R014 to R019) were delivered to Nōgata depot between January and May 1996. These differ from the Minami-Fukuoka sets in having black cab ends. The two-car sets were lengthened to three cars in October 2001 with the addition of 8th-batch SaHa 813-500 centre trailer cars. These cars have longitudinal seating.

The Minami-Fukuoka-based sets are normally used interchangeably with the 813-0 series sets, and the Nōgata-based sets are normally used on the Fukuhoku Yutaka Line.

Set R101 was withdrawn together with R008 and R231 after sustaining damage in a head-on collision in February 2002.

=== Formations ===
==== Minami-Fukuoka sets R102 to R113 ====
Numbering	KuHa 813-100	SaHa 813-100	KuMoHa 813-100
Capacity (total/seated)	132/48	141/56	129/44

The KuHa 813 car is fitted with one PS400K scissors-type pantograph, and has a toilet.

==== Nōgata sets R014 to R019 ====
Numbering	KuHa 813-100	SaHa 813-500	KuMoHa 813-100
Capacity (total/seated)	132/48	161/52	129/44

The KuHa 813 car is fitted with one PS400K scissors-type pantograph, and has a toilet.

== 813-200 series ==
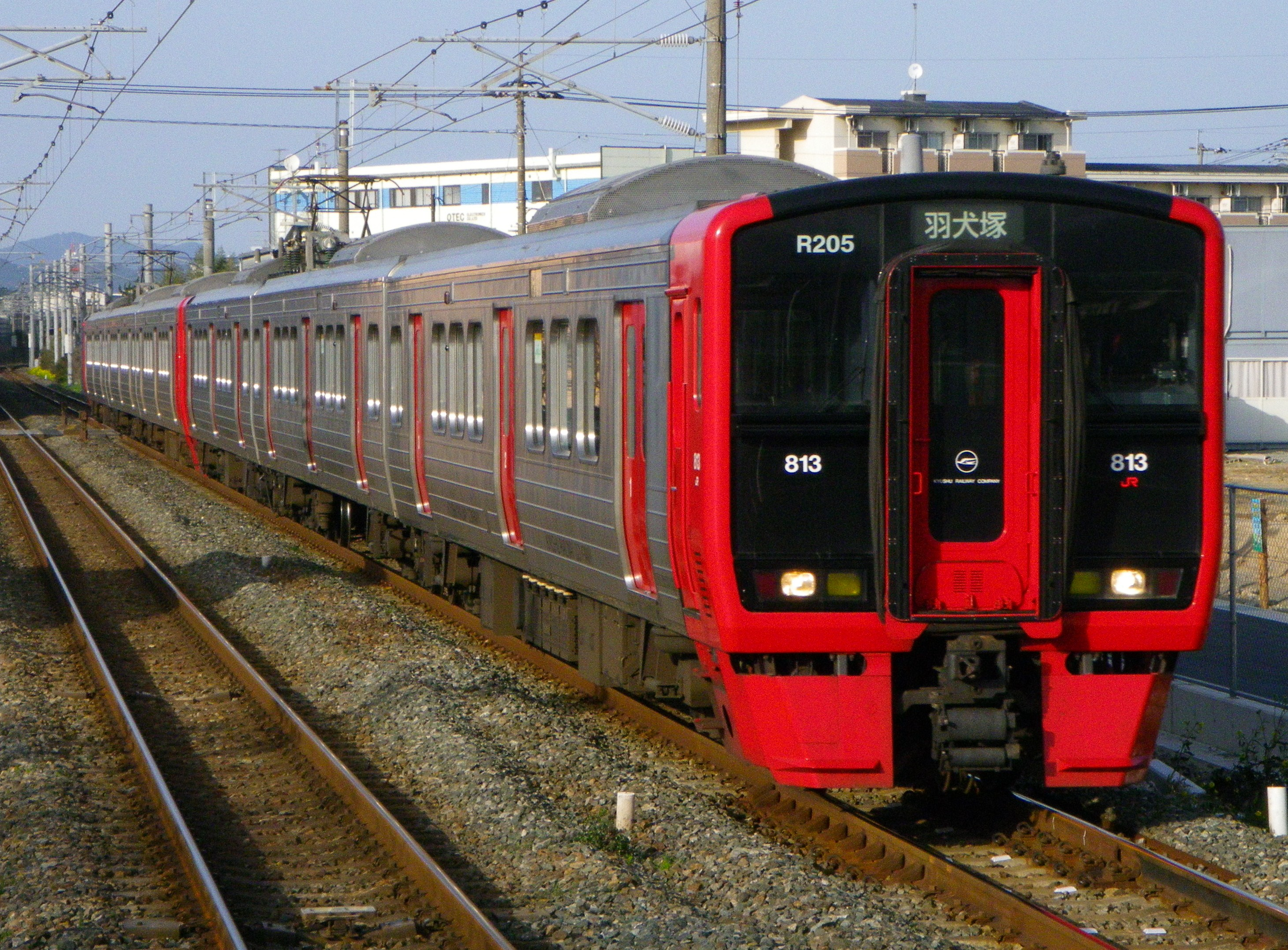
813-200 series set R205 in March 2010

36 three-car 813-200 series sets (R201 to R236) were delivered to Minami-Fukuoka depot between March 1997 and September 1998 to provide increased capacity and replace ageing 423 series and 715 series electric multiple units on the Kagoshima Main Line.

One set, R228, was transferred to Nōgata depot in October 2001, coinciding with the electrification of the Fukuhoku Yutaka Line. This set was repainted with black ends, and is used interchangeably with the Nōgata-based 813-100 series sets.

Set R231 was withdrawn together with R008 and R101 after sustaining damage in a head-on collision in February 2002.

=== Formation ===
Numbering	KuHa 813-200	SaHa 813-200	KuMoHa 813-200
Capacity (total/seated)	128/44	141/56	130/48

The KuHa 813 car is fitted with one PS400K scissors-type pantograph, and has a toilet.

=== Interior ===
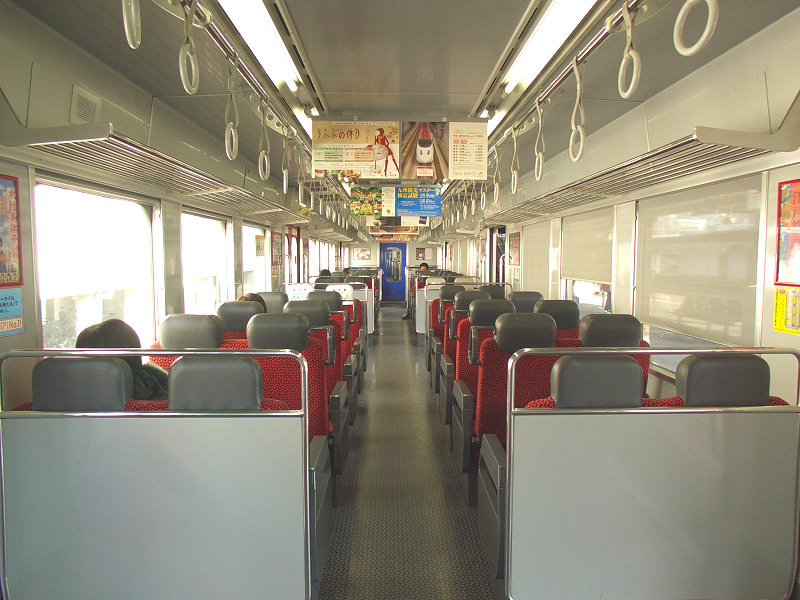
Interior view of KuMoHa 813-236, January 2007

== 813-300 series ==
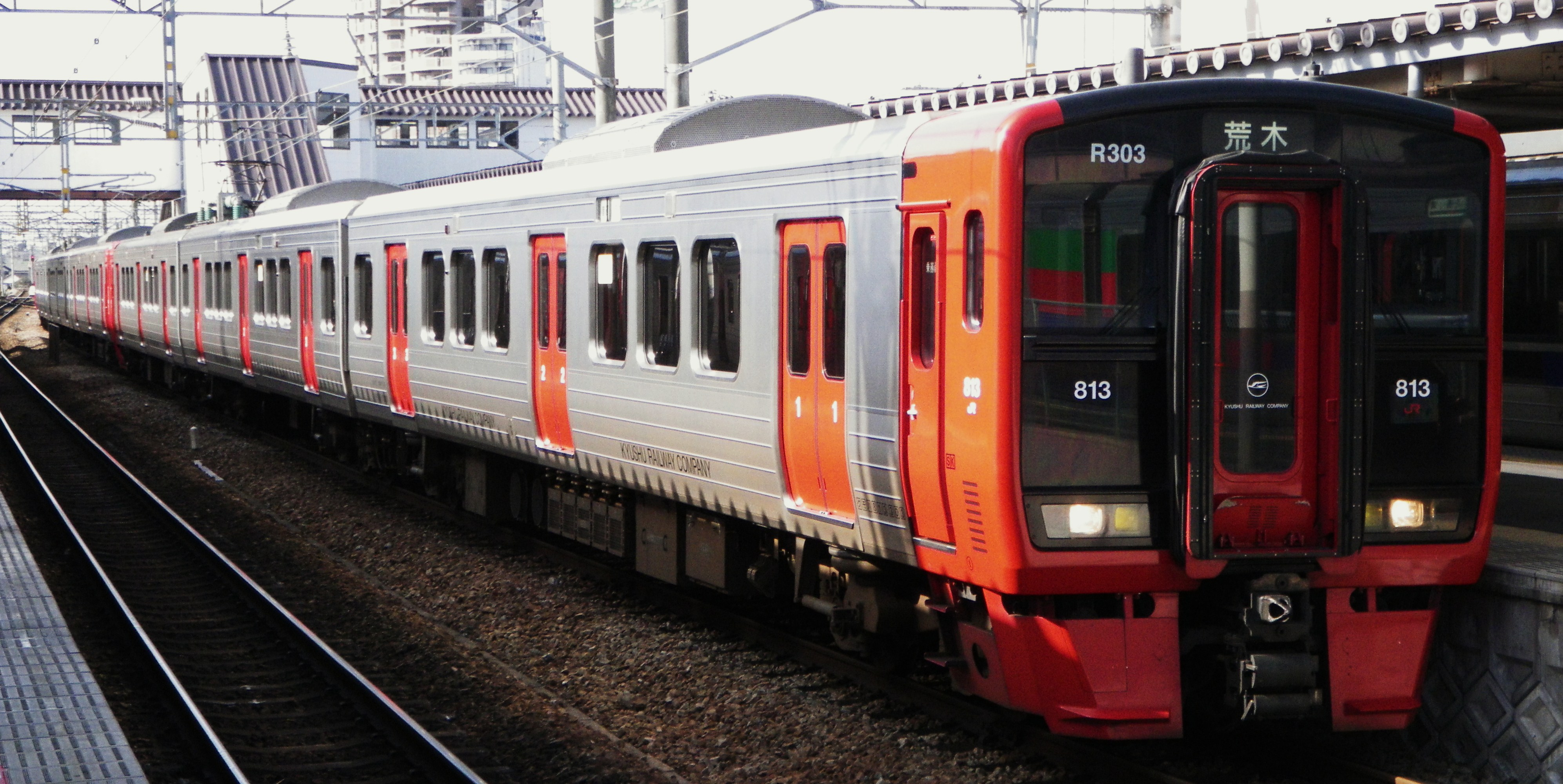
Set R303 in March 2010

Three 9th-batch 813-300 series three-car sets (R301 to R303) were delivered to Minami-Fukuoka depot in February 2003 to replace the three sets (R008, R101, R231) withdrawn following a collision in 2002. These new sets feature universal access toilets, and tinted glass windows. They are normally used interchangeably with the 813-200 series sets.

=== Formation ===
Numbering	KuHa 813-300	SaHa 813-300	KuMoHa 813-300
Capacity (total/seated)	127/40	141/56	130/48

The KuHa 813 car is fitted with one PS400K scissors-type pantograph, and has a toilet and wheelchair space.

== 813-1000 series ==
Three 11th-batch 813-1000 series three-car sets (R1001 to R1003) were delivered to Minami-Fukuoka depot in March 2005. These new sets feature VVVF inverter control.

=== Formation ===
Numbering	KuHa 813-1000	MoHa 813-1000	KuHa 812-1000
Capacity (total/seated)	127/40	141/56	130/48

The KuHa 813 car has a toilet and wheelchair space. The MoHa 813 car is fitted with one PS401K single-arm pantograph.

== 813-1100 series ==
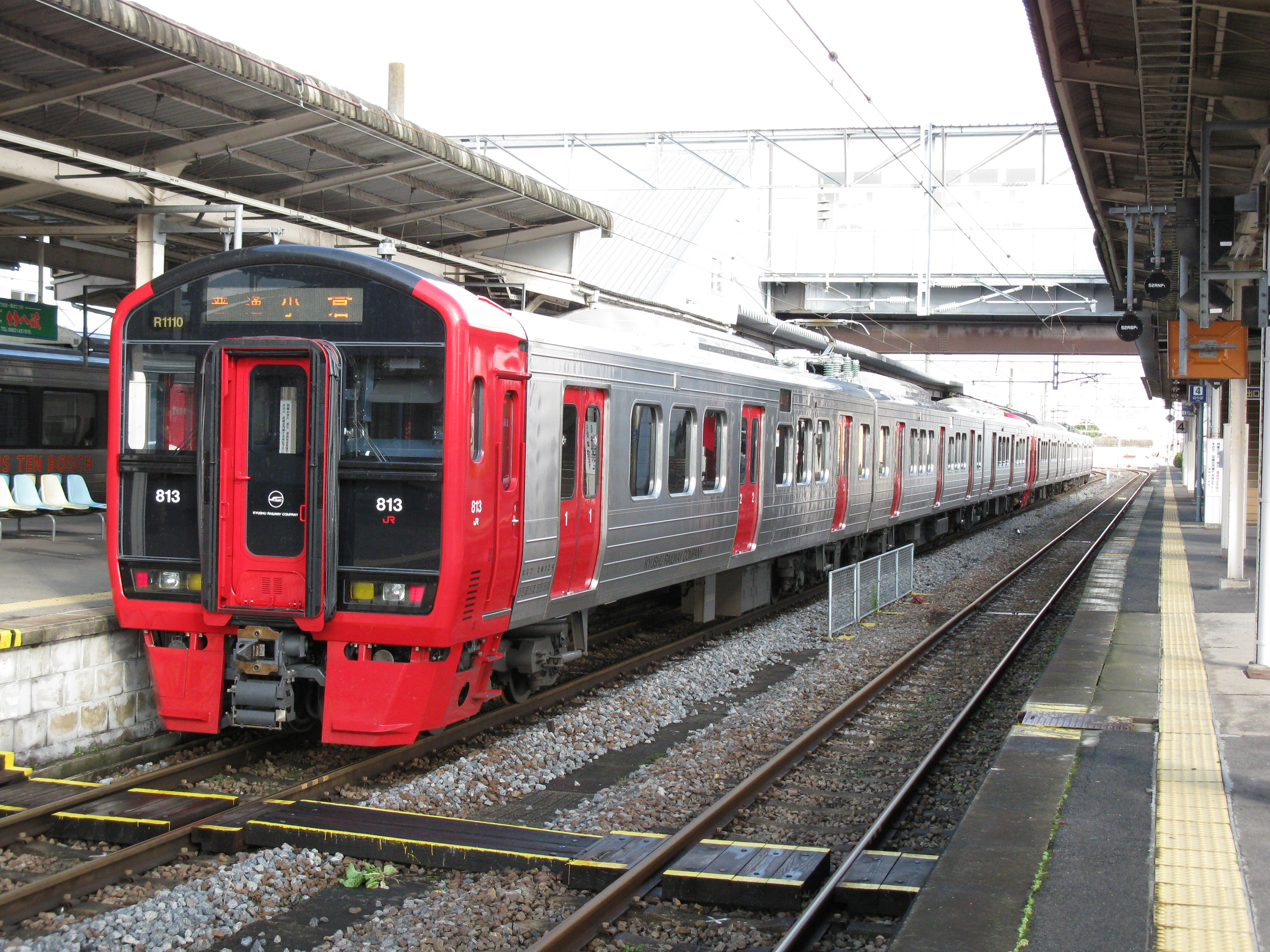
813-1100 series set R1110 in November 2009

Six 12th-batch 813-1100 series 3-car sets (R1101 to R1106) were delivered to Minami-Fukuoka depot in February 2007, followed by nine 13th-batch sets (R1107 to R1115) in September 2009. These new sets feature LED destination indicators, with a redesigned front end. The new 13th-batch sets were configured for wanman driver only operation while the earlier 12th-batch sets were modified for driver only operation between June 2009 and February 2010.

Sets R1105 and R1106 were temporarily renumbered R2105 and R2106 to distinguish them from other sets in the fleet modified for driver only operation, and were returned to their original numbers in 2010 following conversion.

=== Formation ===
Numbering	KuHa 813-1100	MoHa 813-1100	KuHa 812-1100
Capacity (total/seated)	127/40	141/56	130/48

The KuHa 813 car has a toilet and wheelchair space. The MoHa 813 car is fitted with one PS401K single-arm pantograph.

=== Interior ===
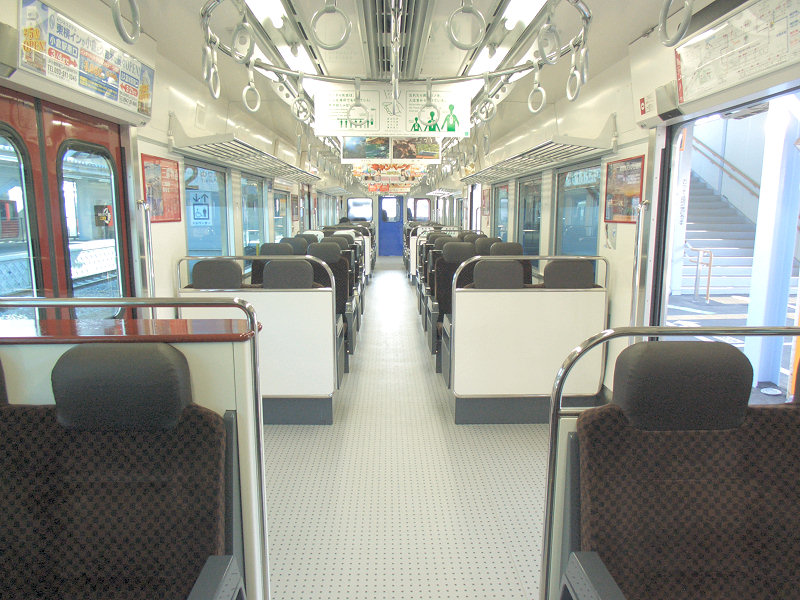
Interior view of 813-1100 series car KuHa 812-1101 in February 2007
