= Tokyo Metro 01 series =

Japanese train type

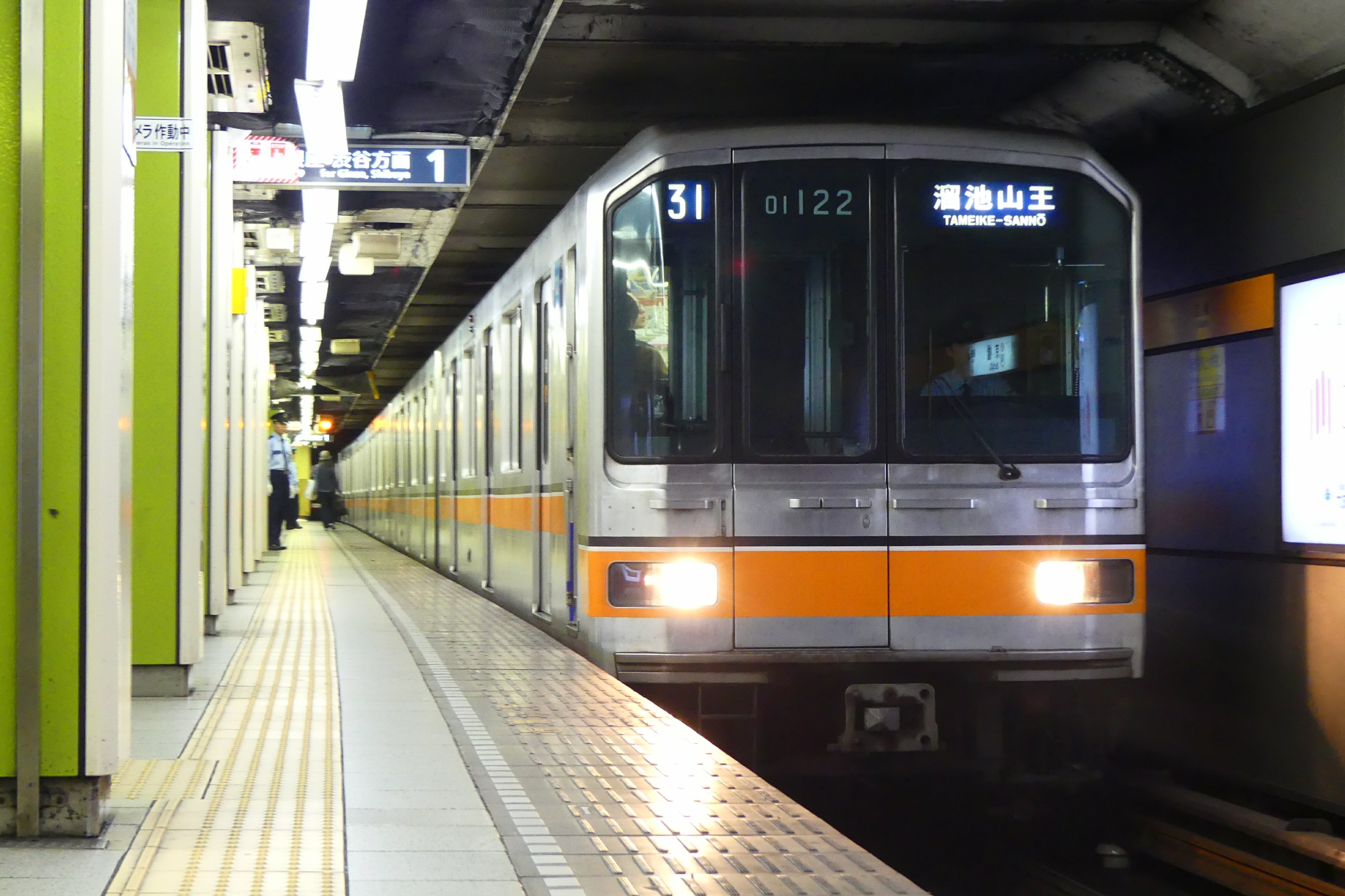
- A Tameike-Sanno-bound 01 series train
- In service: 1984–2017
- Manufacturers: Kawasaki Heavy Industries, Nippon Sharyo, Tokyu Car Corporation, Kinki Sharyo
- Replaced: TRTA 2000 series
- Constructed: 1983–1997
- Entered service: 1 January 1984
- Refurbished: 1990–1995 (air-conditioning retrofit on sets 01-23); 2008–2010 (seat replacement)
- Scrapped: 2013–2017
- Number built: 228 vehicles (38 sets)
- Number in service: 4 vehicles (as Kumamoto Electric Railway 01 series)
- Number preserved: 4 vehicles
- Successor: Tokyo Metro 1000 series
- Formation: 6 cars per trainset
- Fleet numbers: 1-38
- Capacity: 100 (36 seating) (end cars), 102 (42/44 seating) (intermediate cars)
- Operator: Tokyo Metro (previously TRTA)
- Depot: Ueno
- Line served: Tokyo Metro Ginza Line

Specifications
- Car body construction: Aluminium
- Car length: 16,000 mm (52 ft 6 in)
- Width: 2,550 mm (8 ft 4 in)
- Height: 3,465 mm (11 ft 4.4 in); 3,485 mm (11 ft 5.2 in) (set 01)
- Doors: 3 per car
- Maximum speed: 60 km/h (37 mph)
- Weight: 23.5–29.3 t (23.1–28.8 long tons; 25.9–32.3 short tons) per car (chopper control); 21.5–26.8 t (21.2–26.4 long tons; 23.7–29.5 short tons) per car (VVVF)
- Traction system: Chopper control (sets 01-36); IGBT-VVVF (sets 37-38)
- Power output: 120kW
- Transmission: Westinghouse Natal (WN) drive; Gear ratio: 6.73 : 1
- Acceleration: 3 km/(h⋅s) (1.9 mph/s)
- Deceleration: 4 km/(h⋅s) (2.5 mph/s); 4.5 km/(h⋅s) (2.8 mph/s) (Emergency)
- Electric system: 600 V DC, 3rd rail
- Bogies: FS-520 / FS-020 (chopper control); SS-130A / SS-030A (VVVF)
- Braking system: Electronically controlled pneumatic brakes with regenerative braking
- Safety systems: CS-ATC, TASC, ATS (Obsolete)
- Coupling system: Tomlinson
- Track gauge: 1,435 mm (4 ft 8 1/2 in)

The Tokyo Metro 01 series (Japanese: 東京メトロ01系, Hepburn: Tōkyō Metoro 01-kei) was an electric multiple unit (EMU) train type operated by the Tokyo subway operator Tokyo Metro on the Tokyo Metro Ginza Line subway in Tokyo, Japan, from 1983 until March 2017. A total of 38 six-car trainsets (228 cars) were built between 1983 and 1997 in five batches, and the design received the 25th Laurel Prize of the Japan Railfan Club in 1985.

The trains used a Train Automatic Stopping Controller (TASC) system allowing them to automatically stop at stations.

== History ==
By the early 1980s, most of the rolling stock on the Ginza Line were showing signs of aging; some of the stock dated back to before the Second World War, giving a dated image of the line to its passengers. The 01 series was introduced in 1984 with the design theme being "functionality, brightness and chicness". The prototype was completed in May 1983, delivered in September and commenced service on 31 December 1983. It was followed by the introduction of production units starting in 1984. Set number 38 entered service in 1997, being the last train to do so. The 01 series was awarded the Laurel Prize from the Japan Railfan Club in 1985.

The first 23 sets were not originally fitted with any air-conditioning system due to structure gauge restrictions caused by the small tunnel size of the line. In 1990, Mitsubishi Electric developed a 240 mm (9.4 in) thick compact air-conditioning unit with a capacity of 16.2 kW. A prototype air-conditioning unit was tested on set 16 in August and subsequent non-air conditioned sets were all retrofitted afterwards. The ceilings of the air-conditioned trains were lower than that of non-air conditioned trains to accommodate the unit. The trains which were built with air conditioning always had low ceilings.

In November 1986, a practical test of a high-frequency shunt chopper control device that used a power transistor for the element of the field chopper device was conducted on this series for the Tokyo Metro 02 series. In 2007, car 01-238 of set 38 was experimentally fitted with permanent-magnet synchronous motors. In January 2011, the four intermediate cars of set 38 were experimentally fitted with LED lighting. and in December 2011, set 37 was retrofitted with silicon carbide variable frequency drives for trial purposes.

== Formations ==
The six-car sets were formed as shown below, with three motored (M) cars and three non-powered trailer (T) cars, and car 1 at the Shibuya end.

Car No.	1 (to Shibuya)	2	3	4	5	6 (to Asakusa)
Designation	CT1	M	T	M'	M	CT2
Components	MG/SIV2; CP; BT	CHP/VVVF	SIV1	CHP/VVVF		MG/SIV2; CP; BT
Numbering	01-1xx	01-2xx	01-3xx	01-4xx	01-5xx	01-6xx

- Note:
  - CHP: Chopper control
  - MG: 15 kVA motor-generator
  - SIV1: 110 kVA static inverter (for cooling)
  - SIV2: 40 kVA static inverter
  - CP: Air compressor
  - BT: Battery

== Batches ==
Batch	Set numbers	Year built
Prototype	01	1983
1	02-23	1984-1987
2	24-27	1990
3	28-31	1991
4	32-36	1992
5	37	1993
6	38	1997

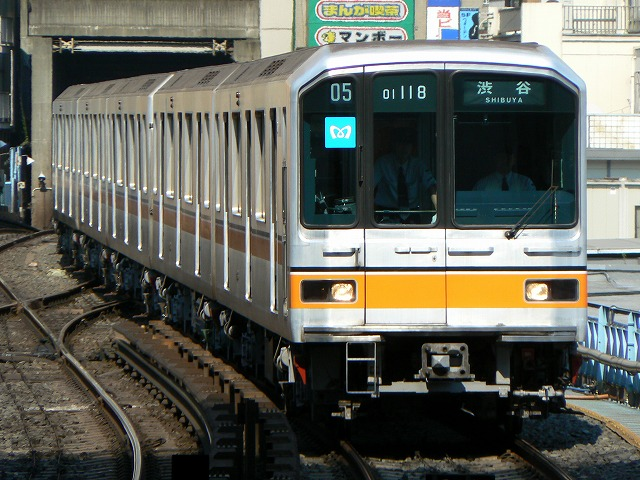
Set 18, one of the production sets introduced in 1986.

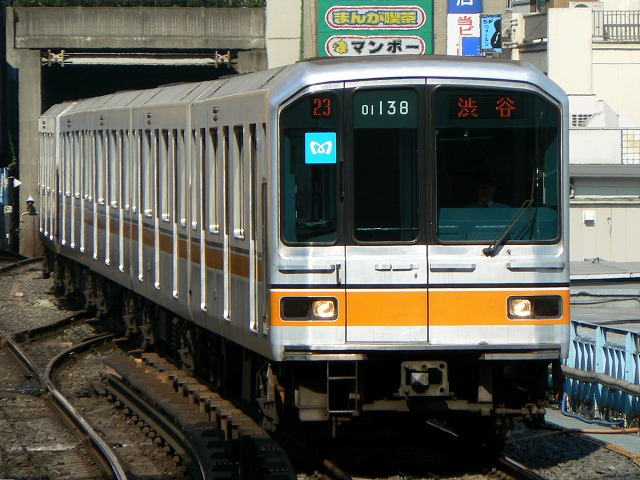
Set 38, which was introduced in 1997 in time for the opening of Tameike-sanno. This set is fitted with LED destination display instead of roller blinds and uses VVVF inverters instead of chopper control.

== Undercarriage equipment ==
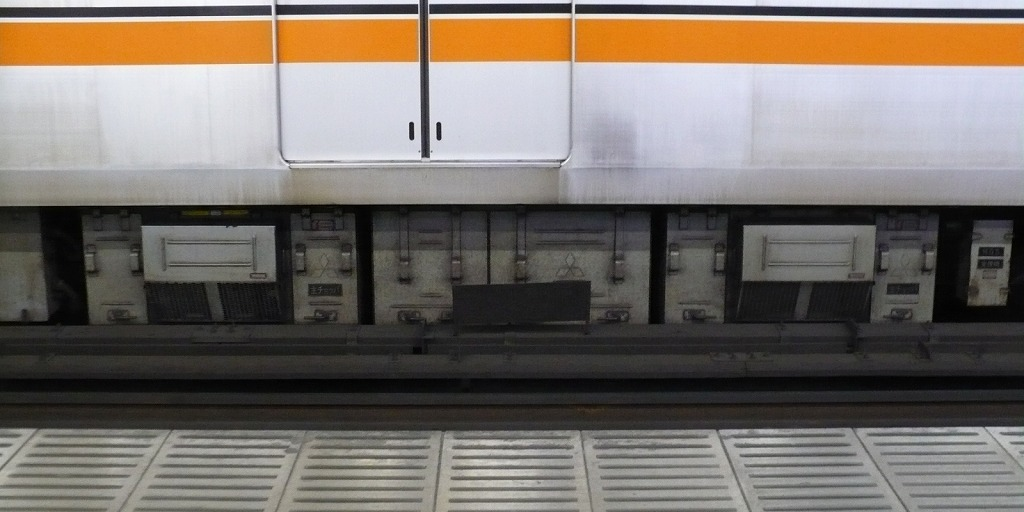
Armature chopper control on the 01 series

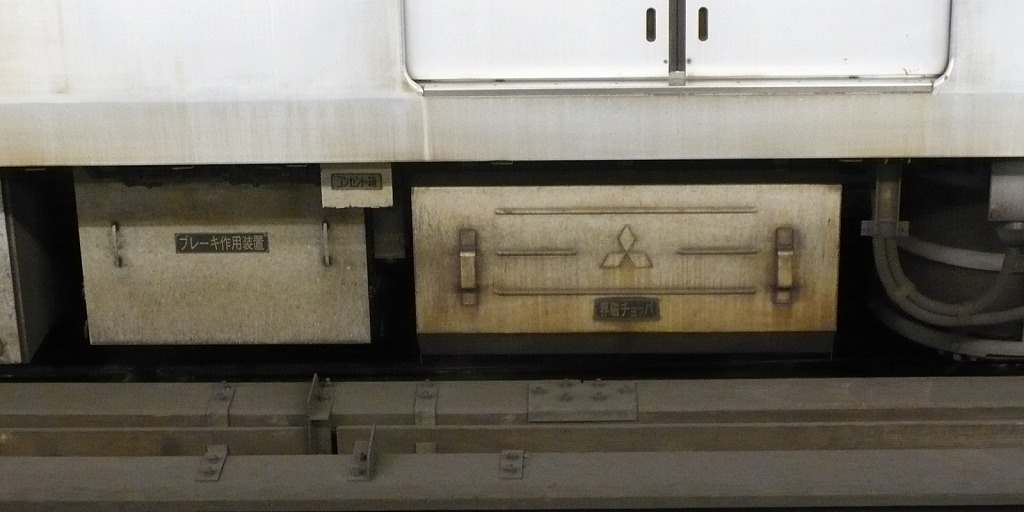
Field chopper control on the 01 series

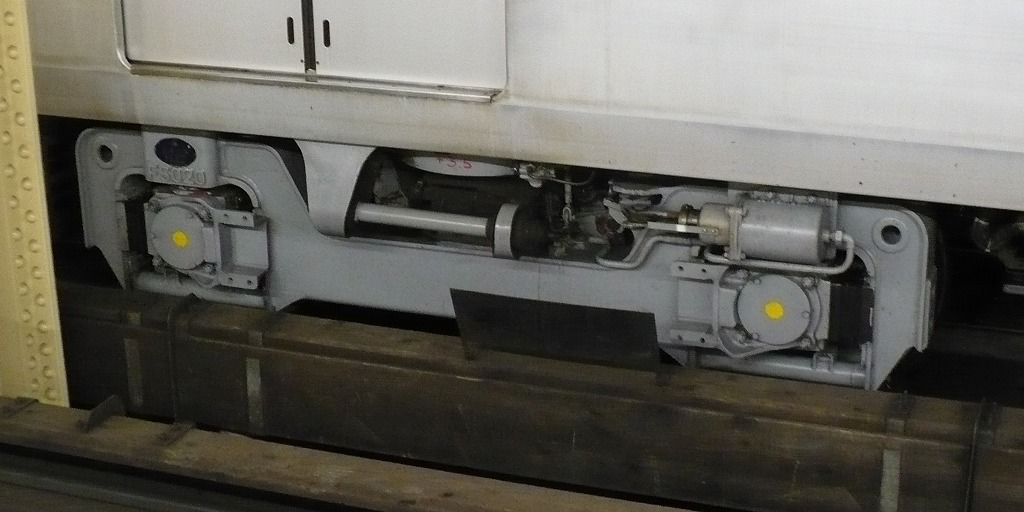
FS020 bogie as used on the 01 series

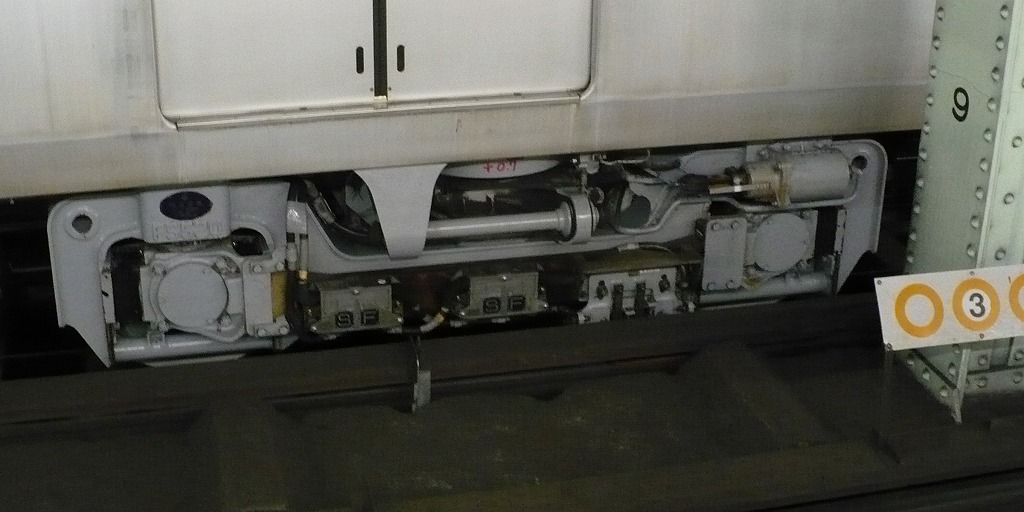
FS520 bogie as used on the 01 series

== Interior ==
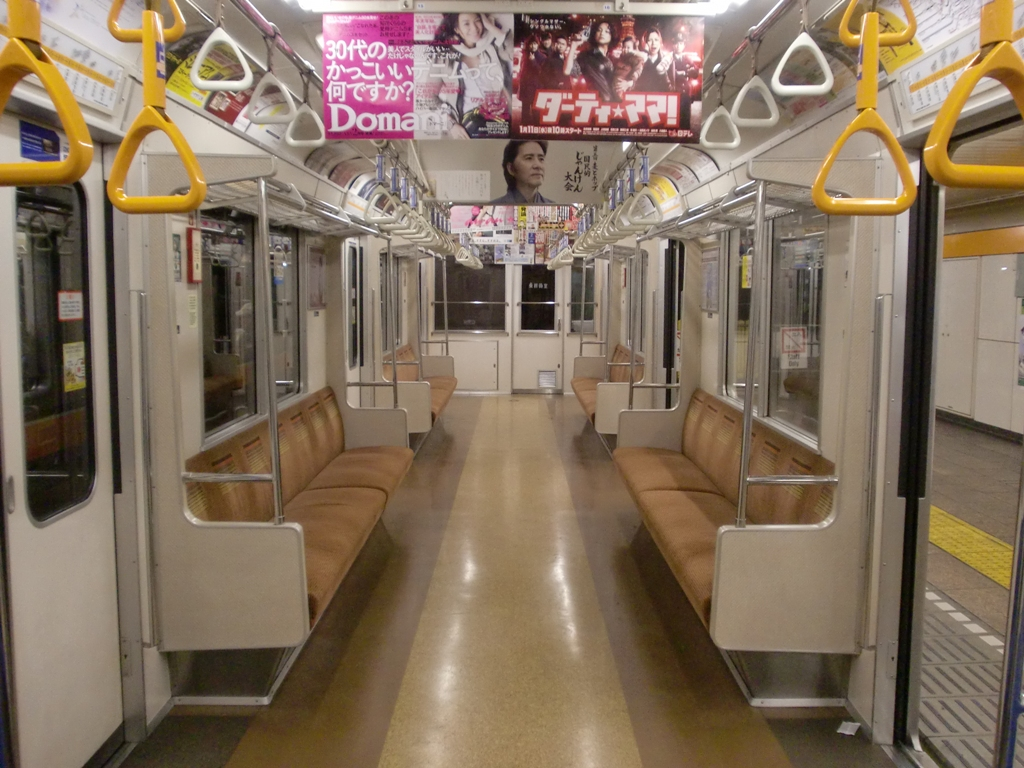
Interior of the prototype set

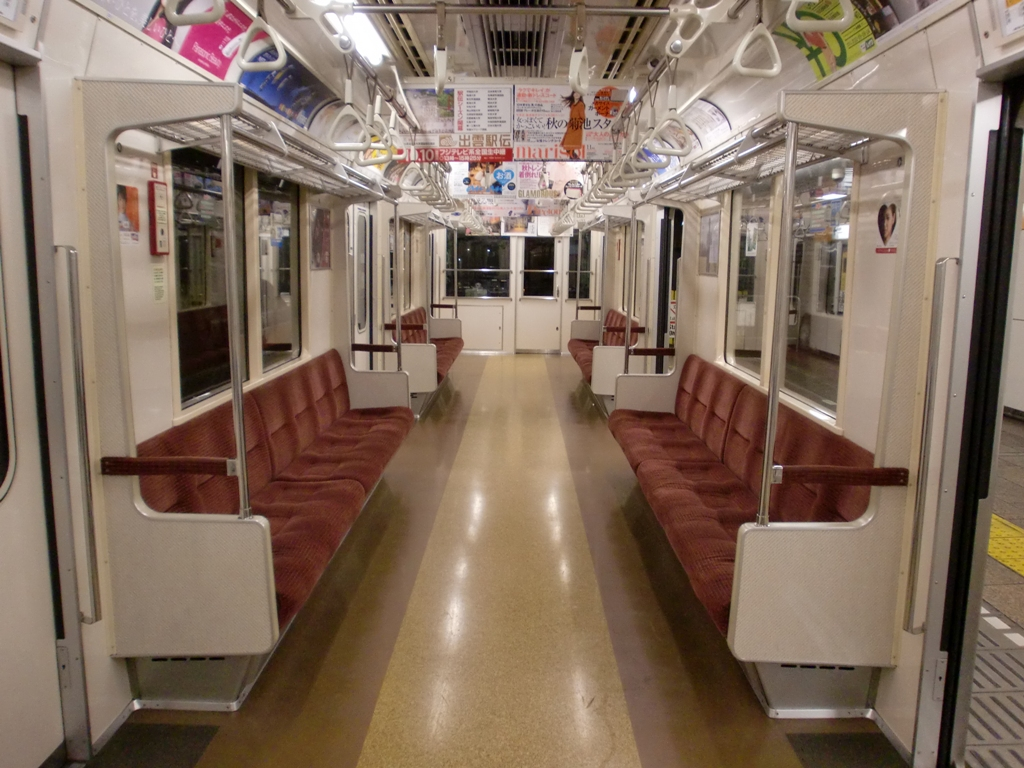
Interior of set 37, a VVVF set

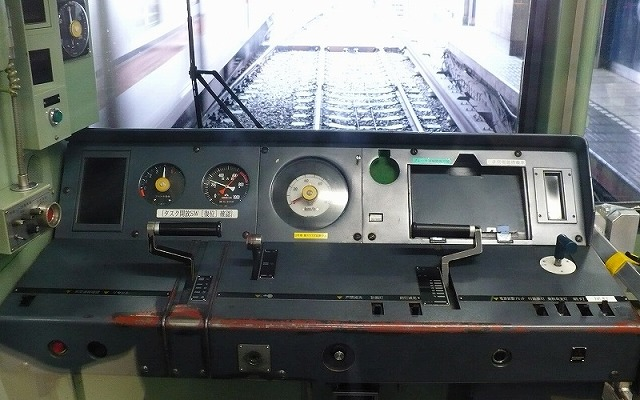
Driver's cab of the 01 series

== Withdrawal ==
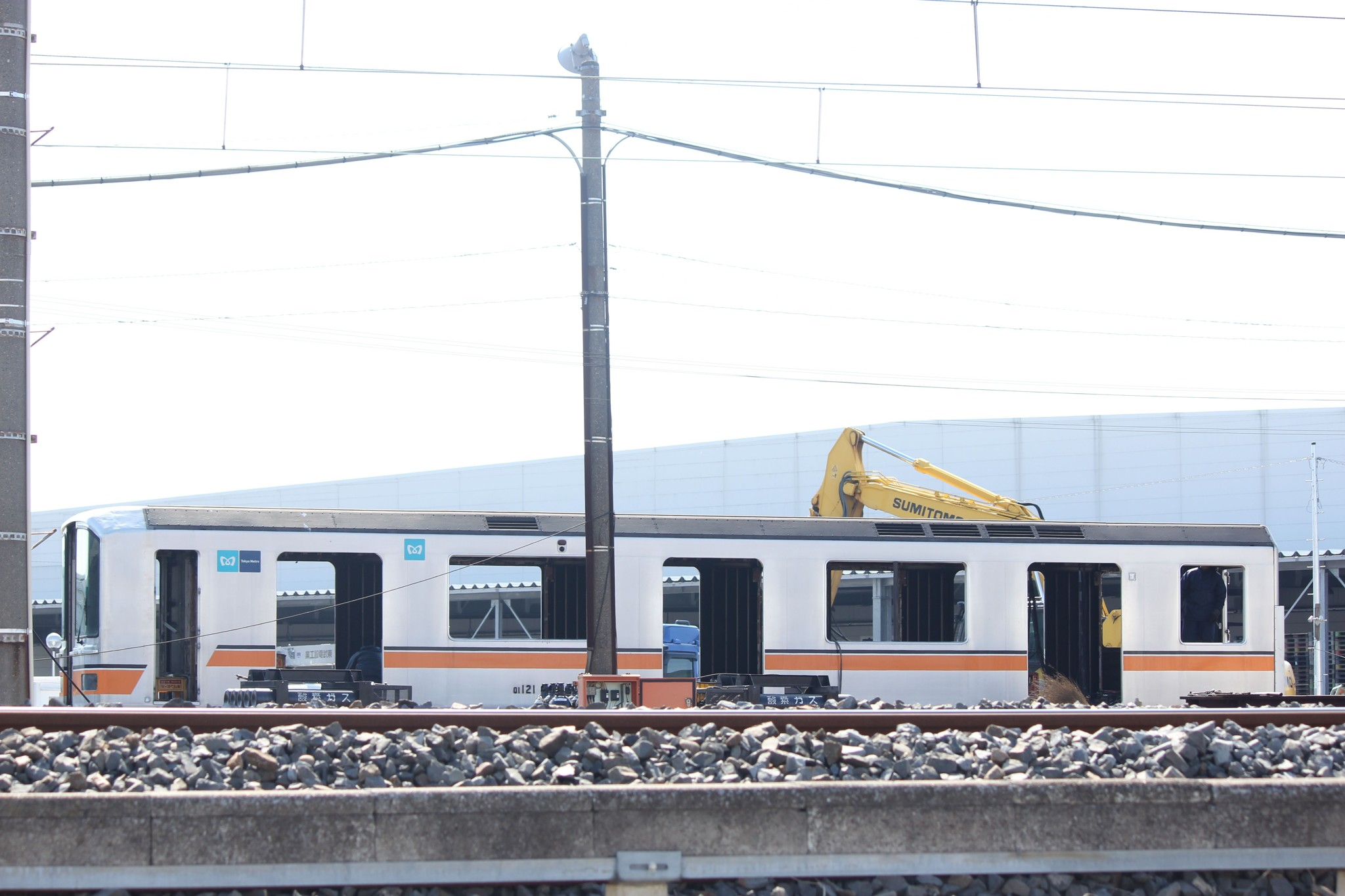
Car 01-121 being cut up in March 2014

The 01 series trains began to be replaced by new 1000 series trains from spring 2012. The first set to be withdrawn, set 38, was removed for scrapping in August 2013. By 1 April 2016, nine sets remained in service. The last remaining 01 series train was withdrawn from regular service on 10 March 2017, with a special commemorative final run for invited guests on 12 March.

== Resale ==
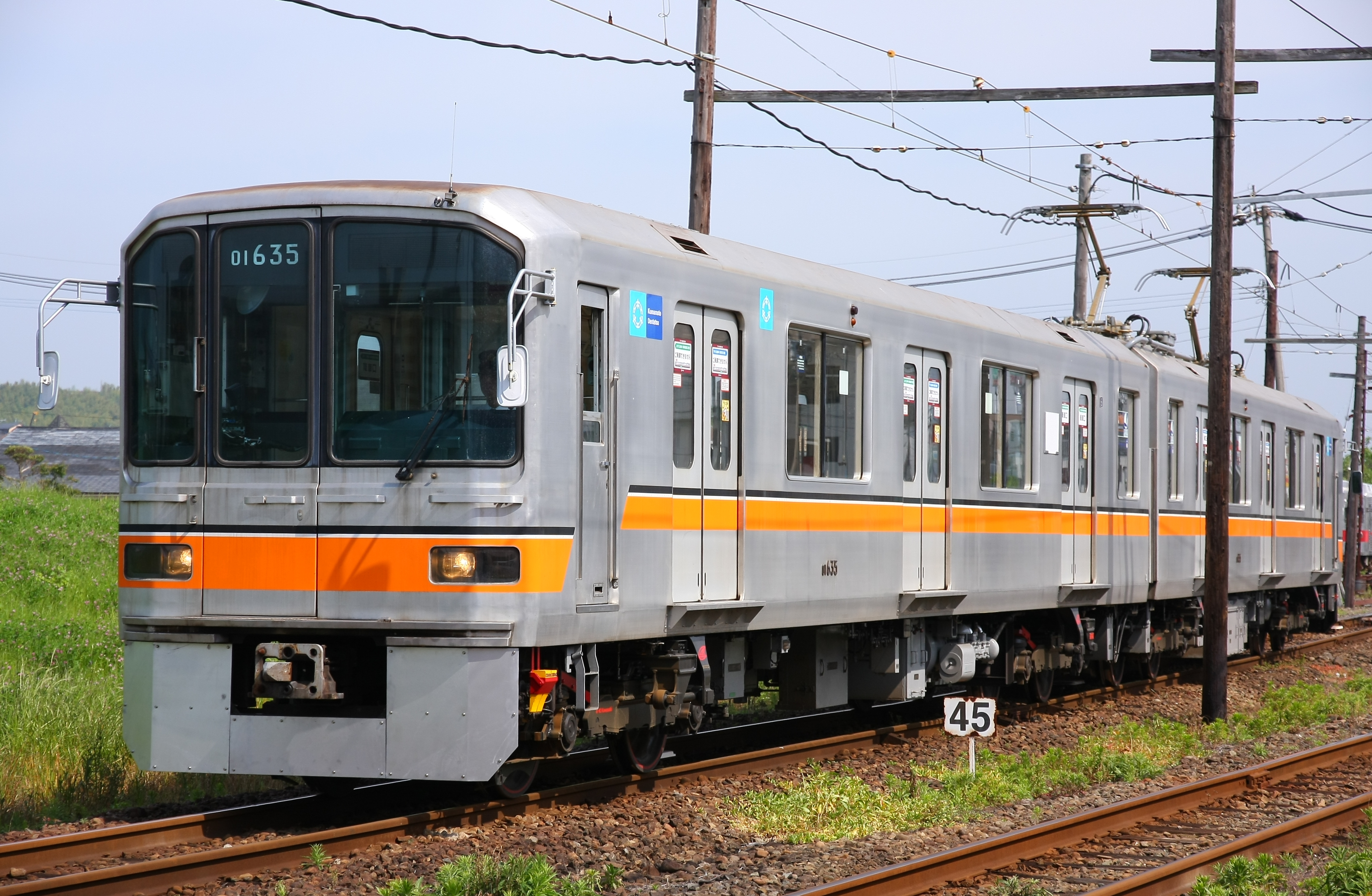
Former 01 series cars 01-135 and 01-635 as a Kumamoto Electric Railway 01 series in May 2016

In February 2015, driving cars 01-136 and 01-636 were sold to the Kumamoto Electric Railway in Kyushu and were also regauged to 1,067 mm (3 ft 6 in), where they became the Kumamoto Electric Railway 01 series, entering service in March 2015 following the addition of pantographs, new bogies, and front skirts. Two more cars, 01-135 and 01-635, were sold to the Kumamoto Electric Railway during fiscal 2015.

== Preserved examples ==
Car No.	Set No.	Location
01-101	1	Nakano Depot in Tokyo
01-201	1	Nakano Depot in Tokyo
01-601	1	Nakano Depot in Tokyo
01-129	29	Metro Museum in Edogawa, Tokyo (cab end only)
01-630	30	University of Tokyo Institute of Industrial Science Chiba Experiment Station

Three cars of former set 1 (01-101, 01-201, and 01-601), withdrawn from revenue service in 2013, are kept for training purposes at Nakano Depot in Tokyo.

The cab end of car 01-129 is preserved inside the Metro Museum in Edogawa, Tokyo.

Car 01-630 was donated to the University of Tokyo's Institute of Industrial Science Chiba Experiment Station in Chiba Prefecture in 2017 for use on its 333 m long research test track.
