= Tokyo Metro 1000 series =

Japanese train type

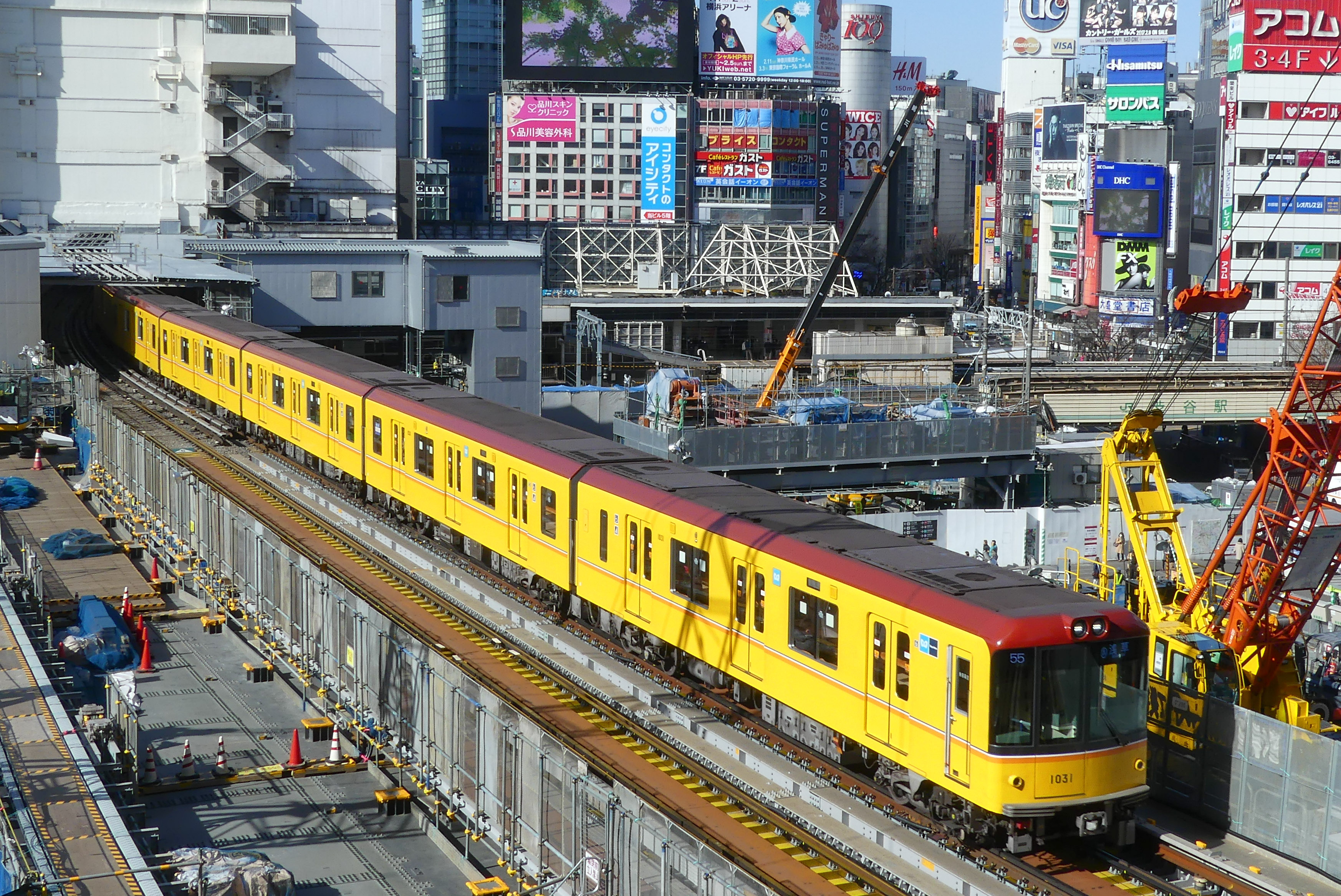
- A Ginza Line 1000 series train at Shibuya Station
- In service: 2012–present
- Manufacturer: Nippon Sharyo
- Built at: Toyokawa
- Replaced: Tokyo Metro 01 series
- Constructed: 2011–2017
- Entered service: 11 April 2012
- Number built: 240 vehicles (40 sets)
- Number in service: 240 vehicles (40 sets)
- Formation: 6 cars per trainset
- Fleet numbers: 51–90
- Capacity: 93 (28 seating) (end cars), 106 (40 seating) (intermediate cars)
- Operator: Tokyo Metro
- Depot: Ueno
- Line served: Tokyo Metro Ginza Line

Specifications
- Car body construction: Aluminium alloy, double-skin
- Car length: 16,000 mm (52 ft 6 in)
- Width: 2,550 mm (8 ft 4 in)
- Height: 3,465 mm (11 ft 4.4 in)
- Doors: Sliding doors (3 pairs per side)
- Maximum speed: 80 km/h (50 mph)
- Weight: 164.5 t (161.9 long tons; 181.3 short tons)
- Traction system: IGBT-VVVF (Toshiba)
- Traction motors: Toshiba PMSM
- Power output: 1,200 kW (1,609 hp)
- Transmission: Westinghouse-Natal drive (7.79 gear ratio)
- Acceleration: 3.3 km/(h⋅s) (2.1 mph/s)
- Deceleration: 4.0 km/(h⋅s) (2.5 mph/s) (service); 4.5 km/(h⋅s) (2.8 mph/s) (emergency)
- Electric systems: 600 V DC (third rail)
- Current collection: Contact shoe
- UIC classification: 2′(1A)+(A1)(1A)+(A1)(1A)+(A1)(1A)+(A1)(1A)+(A1)2′
- Bogies: SC101
- Braking system: Electronically controlled pneumatic brakes with regenerative braking
- Safety systems: ATC, TASC
- Coupling system: Tomlinson
- Track gauge: 1,435 mm (4 ft 8 1/2 in) standard gauge

Notes/references
- This train won the 56th Blue Ribbon Award in 2013.

The Tokyo Metro 1000 series (東京メトロ1000系, Tōkyō Metoro 1000-kei) is an electric multiple unit (EMU) train type operated by the Tokyo subway operator Tokyo Metro in Japan on the Tokyo Metro Ginza Line since April 2012.

The first trainset was delivered in September 2011 ahead of entry into revenue service from 11 April 2012, with full-production sets entering service from 2013.

== Design ==
The design of the new 1000 series trains is a modern rendition of the original 1000 series trains, which were originally used on the Ginza Line when the line opened in 1927. The new 1000 series uses newly developed bogies with steerable axles to reduce flange noise on sharp curves.

The 1000 series trains use Toshiba-manufactured permanent magnet synchronous motors (PMSM), offering 20% energy savings compared to the VVVF inverter-controlled motors used in earlier 01 series trains.

The trains are lit entirely with LED lights, including the headlights, offering energy savings of 40% when compared to fluorescent lighting. The LED lighting is supplied by Panasonic Electric Works.

The design was awarded the 2013 Blue Ribbon Award, presented annually by the Japan Railfan Club, and a presentation ceremony was held at Nakano Depot on 12 October 2013.

== Formation ==
The sets are formed as follows, with car 1 at the Shibuya end and car 6 at the Asakusa end. Each car is motored, with the outer axle on each bogie being motored; however, the outermost bogies on each trainset are not motored.

	← Shibuya Asakusa →					
Car No.	1	2	3	4	5	6
Designation	1100 (CM1)	1200 (M1)	1300 (M1')	1400 (M2)	1500 (M1)	1000 (CM2)
Capacity (total/seated)	93/28	106/40	106/40	106/40	106/40	93/28
Numbering	1101 : 1140	1201 : 1240	1301 : 1340	1401 : 1440	1501 : 1540	1001 : 1040

Car 6 in sets 1101 to 1121 was initially numbered in the "16xx" series, but they were renumbered in the "10xx" series between June and July 2015, and sets 1122 onward were delivered with cars already numbered in the "10xx" series.

== Exterior ==
The trains are finished in a lemon yellow livery applied using vinyl sheets, evoking the appearance of the original 1000 series trains introduced on the line in 1927. Sets 1139 and 1140 were finished to more closely resemble the original 1000 series trains, with a single large front (LED) headlight.

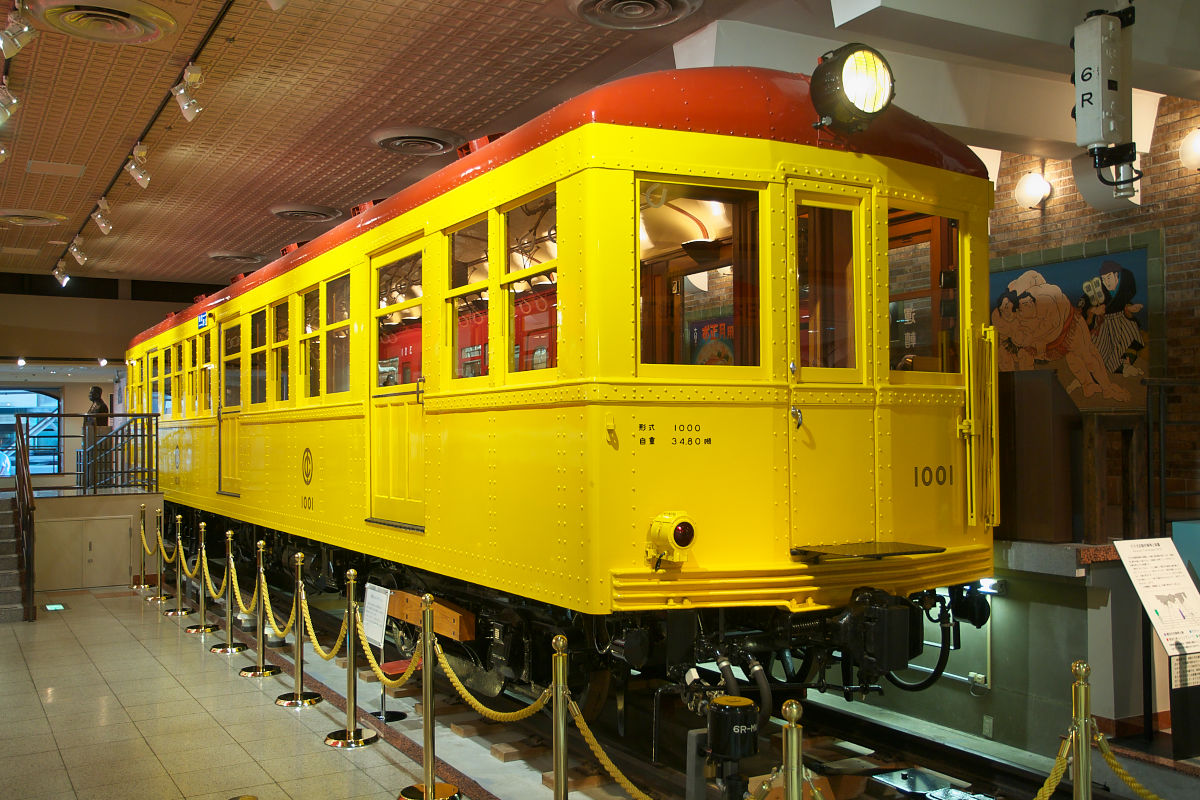
Original 1000 series car preserved at Tokyo Subway Museum

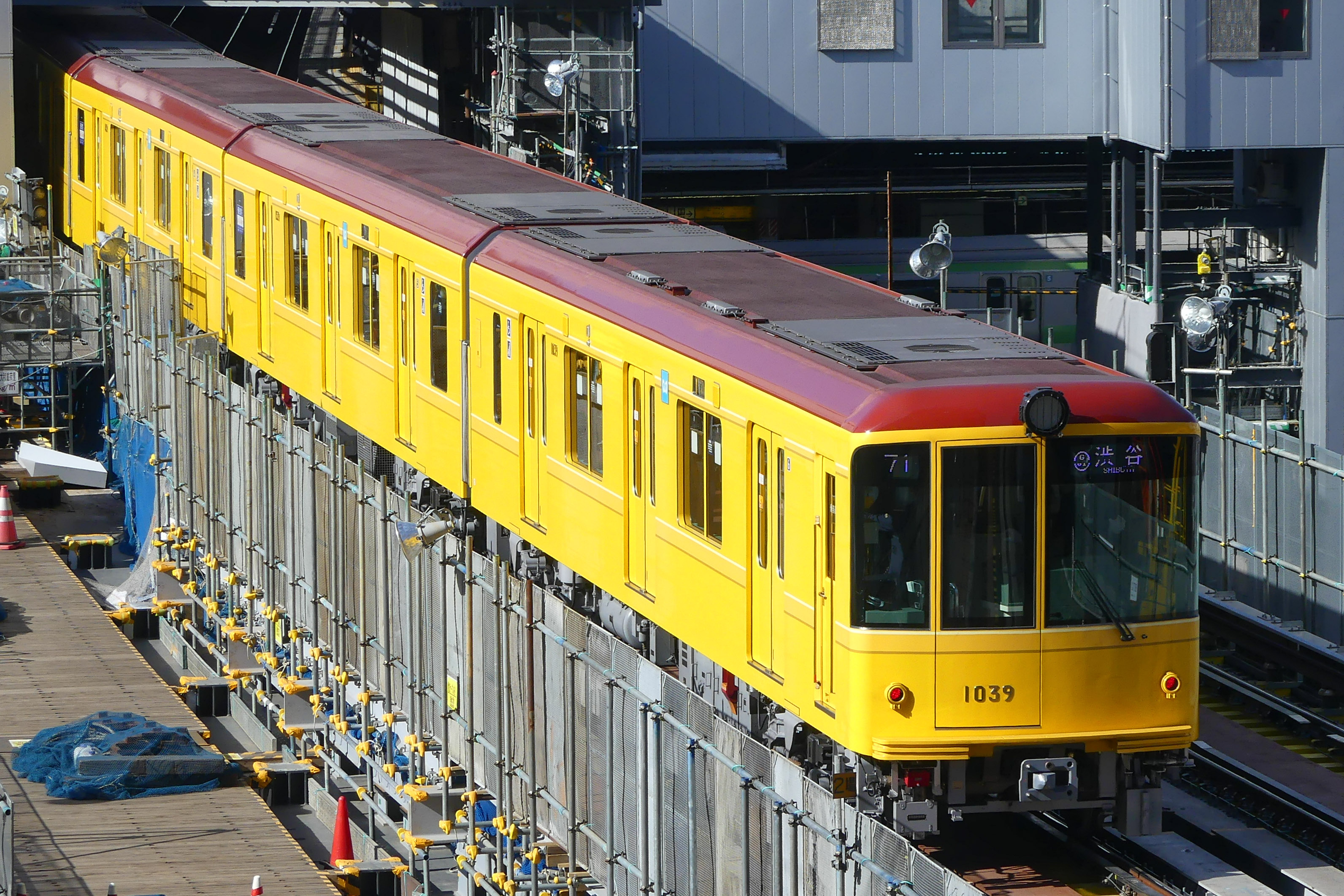
Set 1139, with a single front headlight and different tail lights

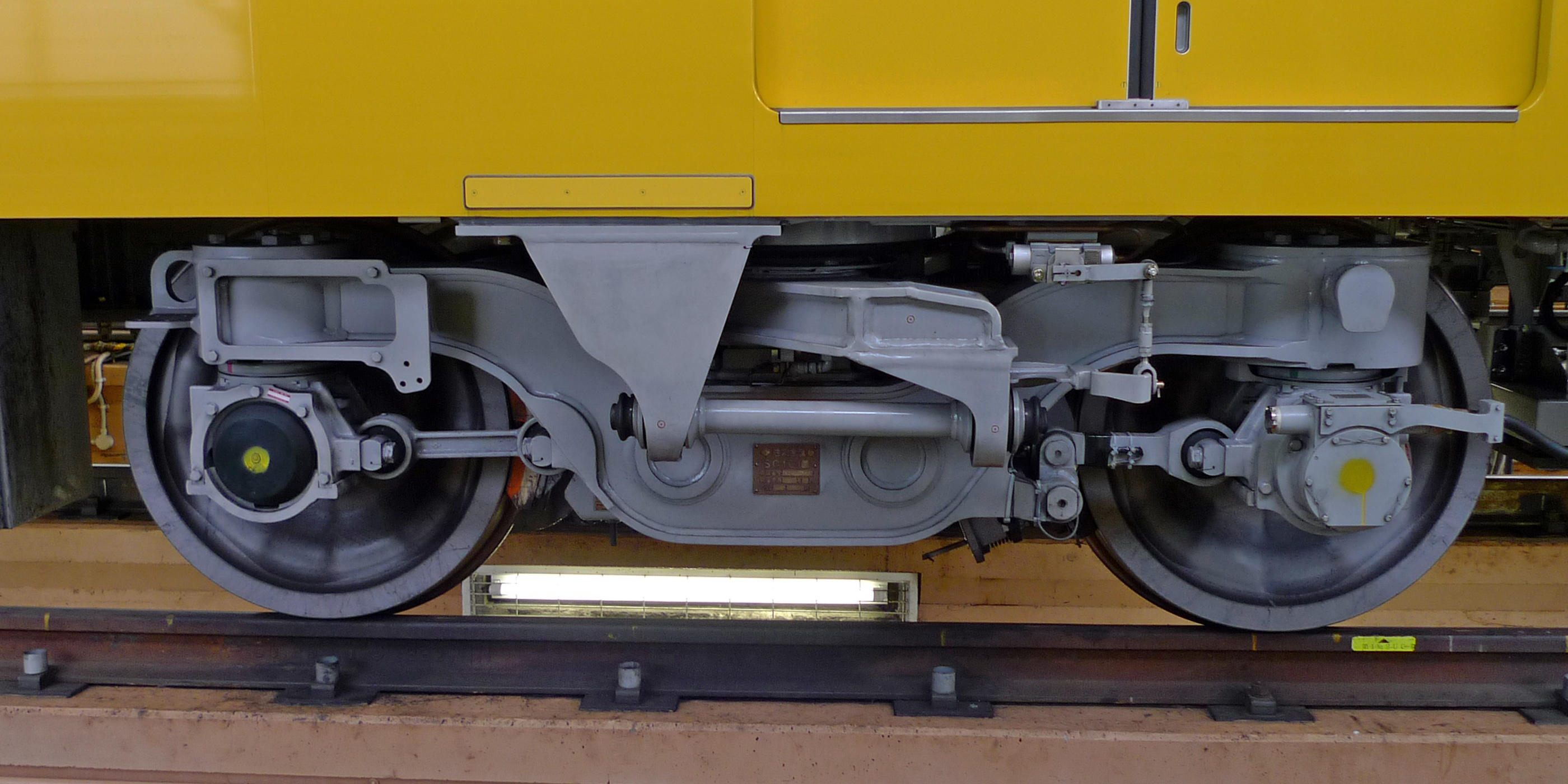
SC101 bogie as used on the 1000 series

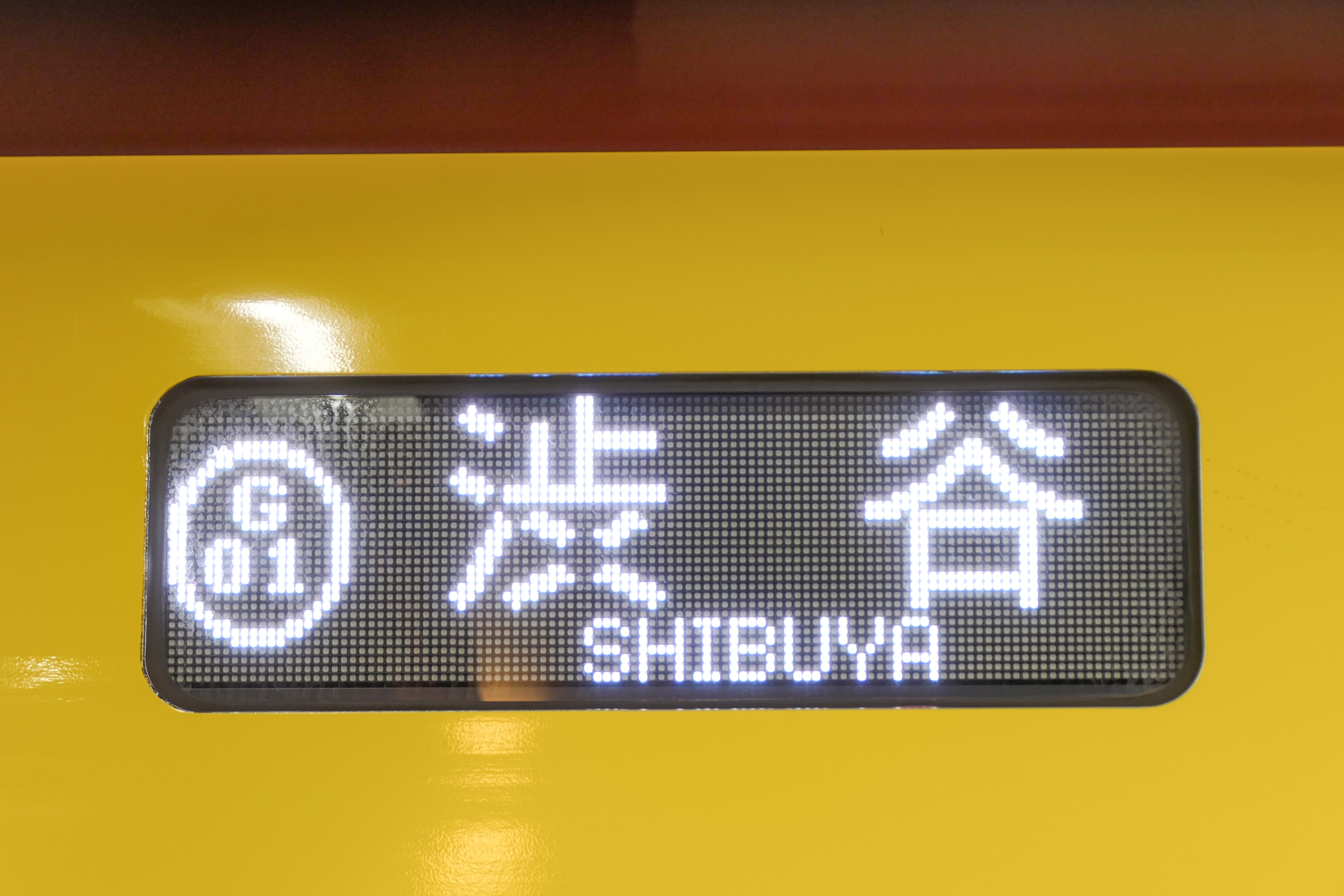
full-colour LED display as used on the 1000 series

== Interior ==
Internally, the new trains feature 17-inch (430 mm) LCD passenger information displays above each door. Sets up to 1133 were delivered with two screens, while sets 1134 onwards have three screens, while all prior sets are being retrofitted with the three-screen layout. Seat width is increased from 430 mm (16.9 in) to 460 mm (18.1 in). Luggage racks and strap handles have been lowered by 100 mm (3.9 in) compared to the 01 series trains.

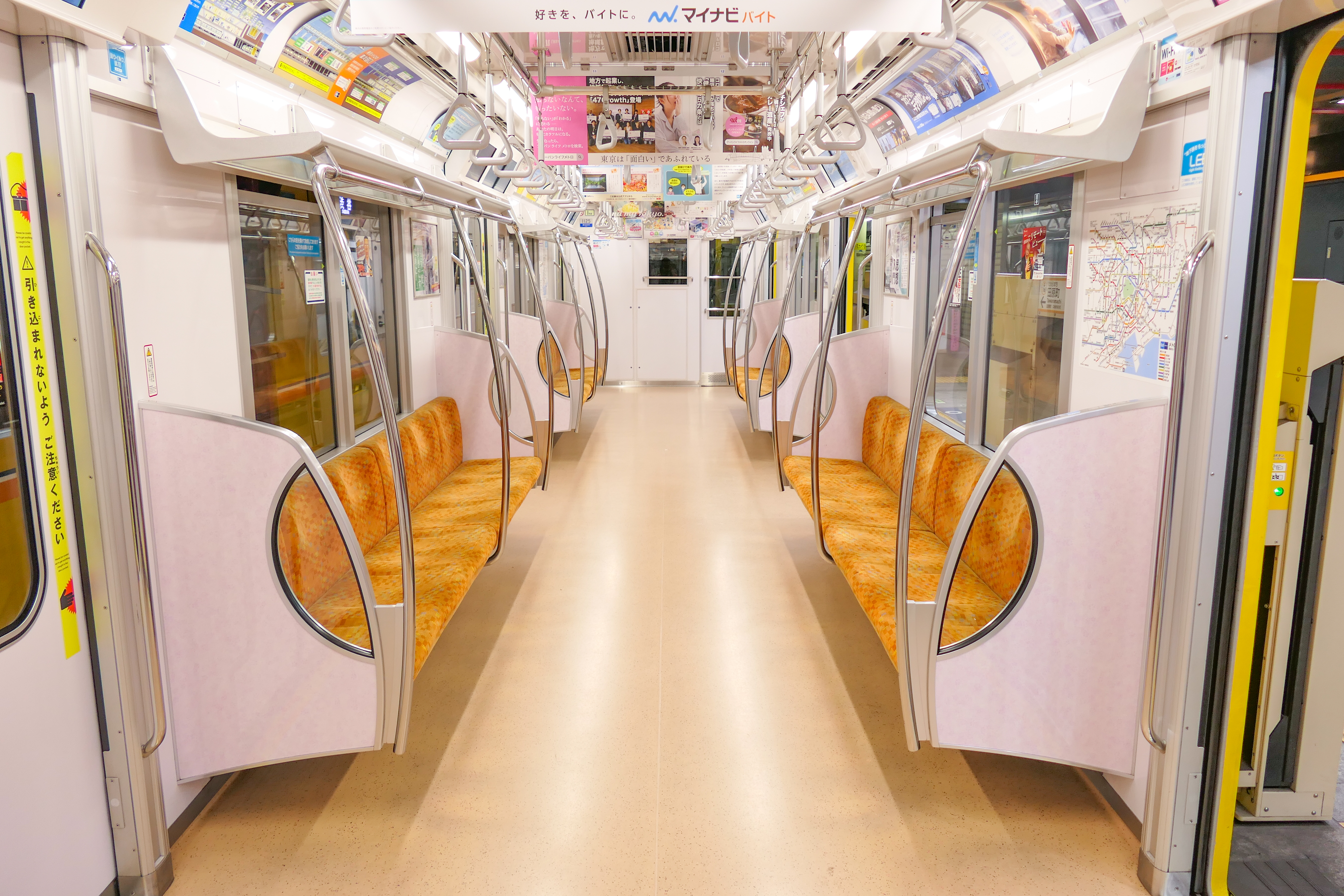
General interior view

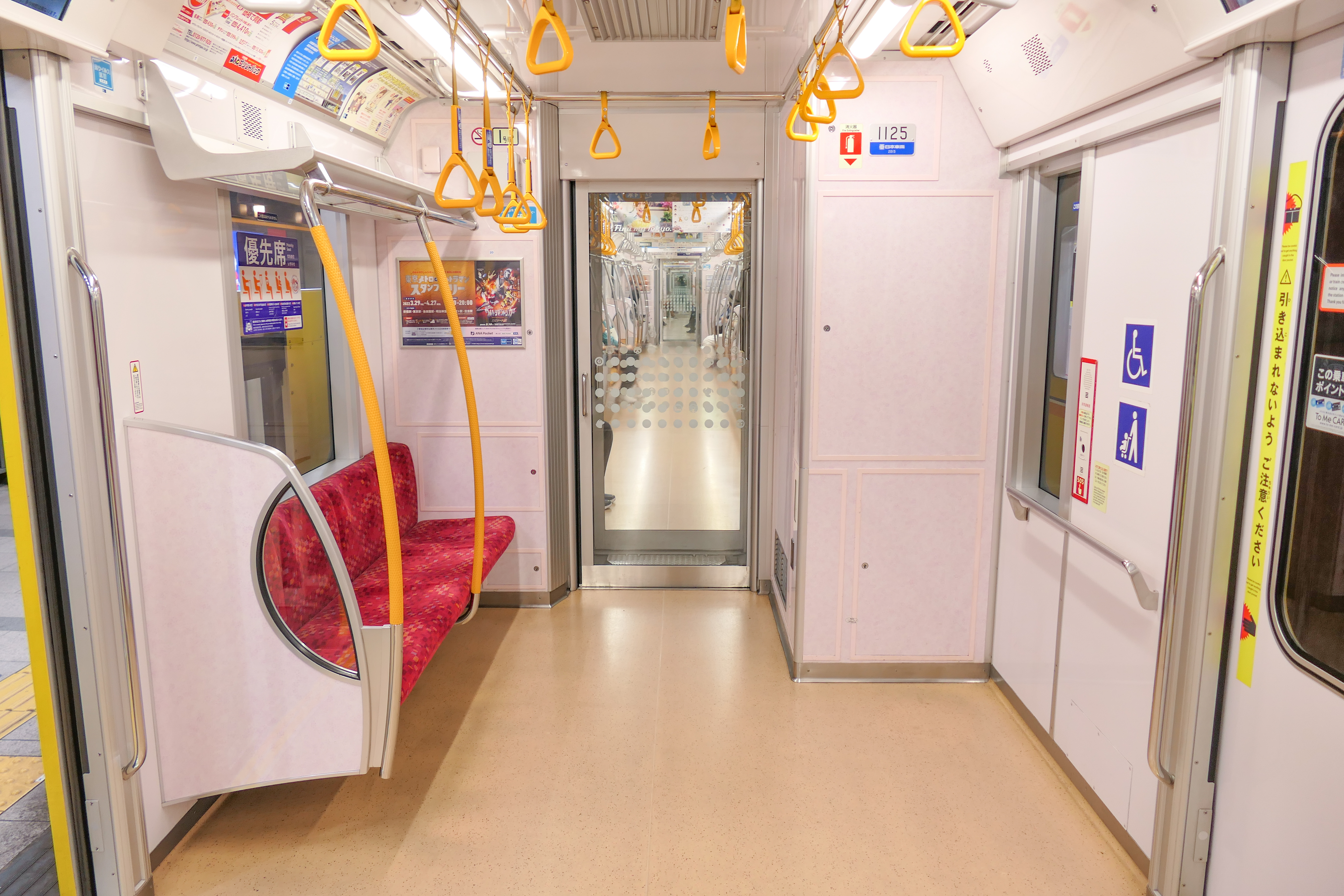
Car end section with "Priority" seating

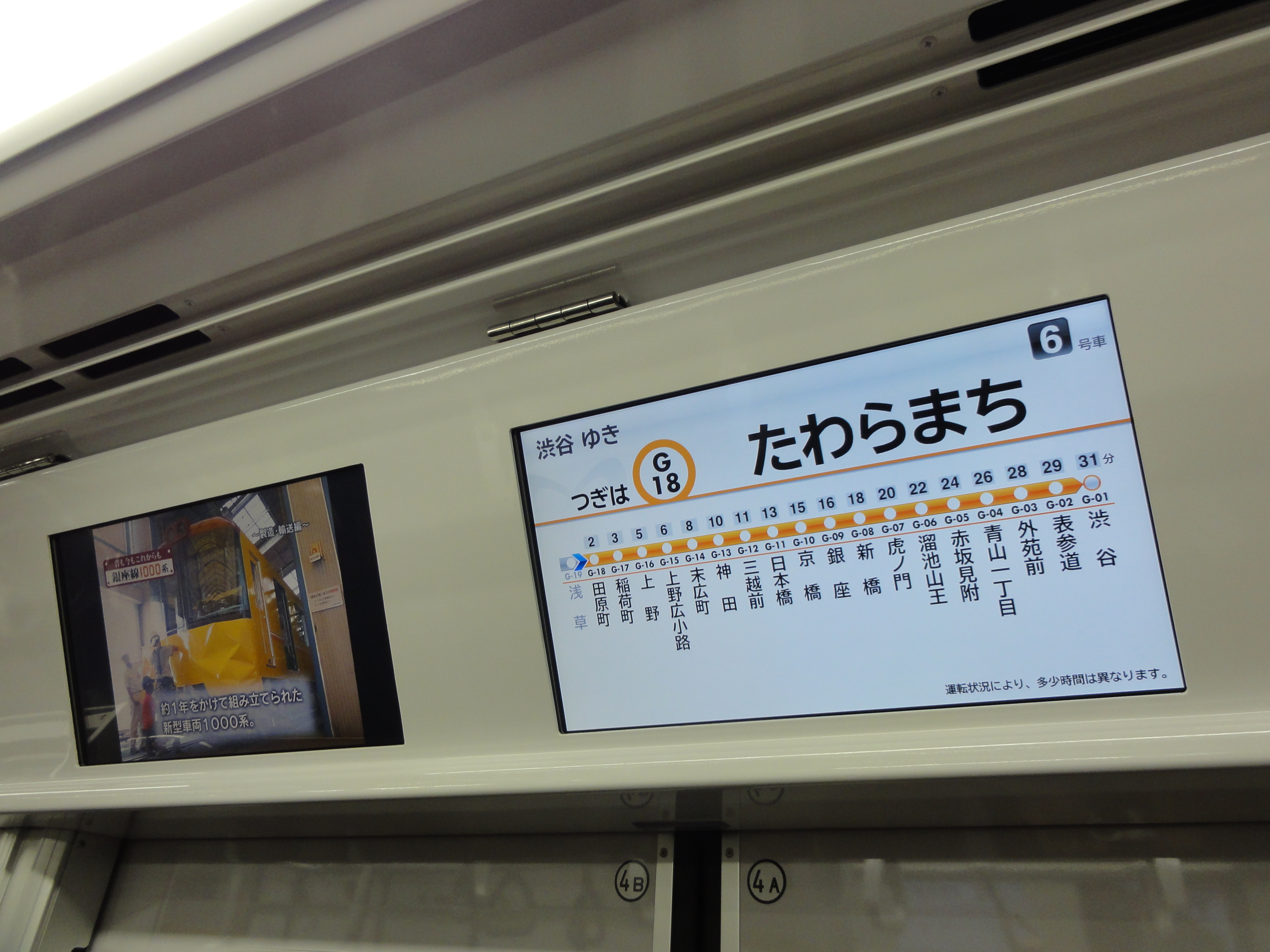
2-panel LCD passenger information displays in sets up to 1133

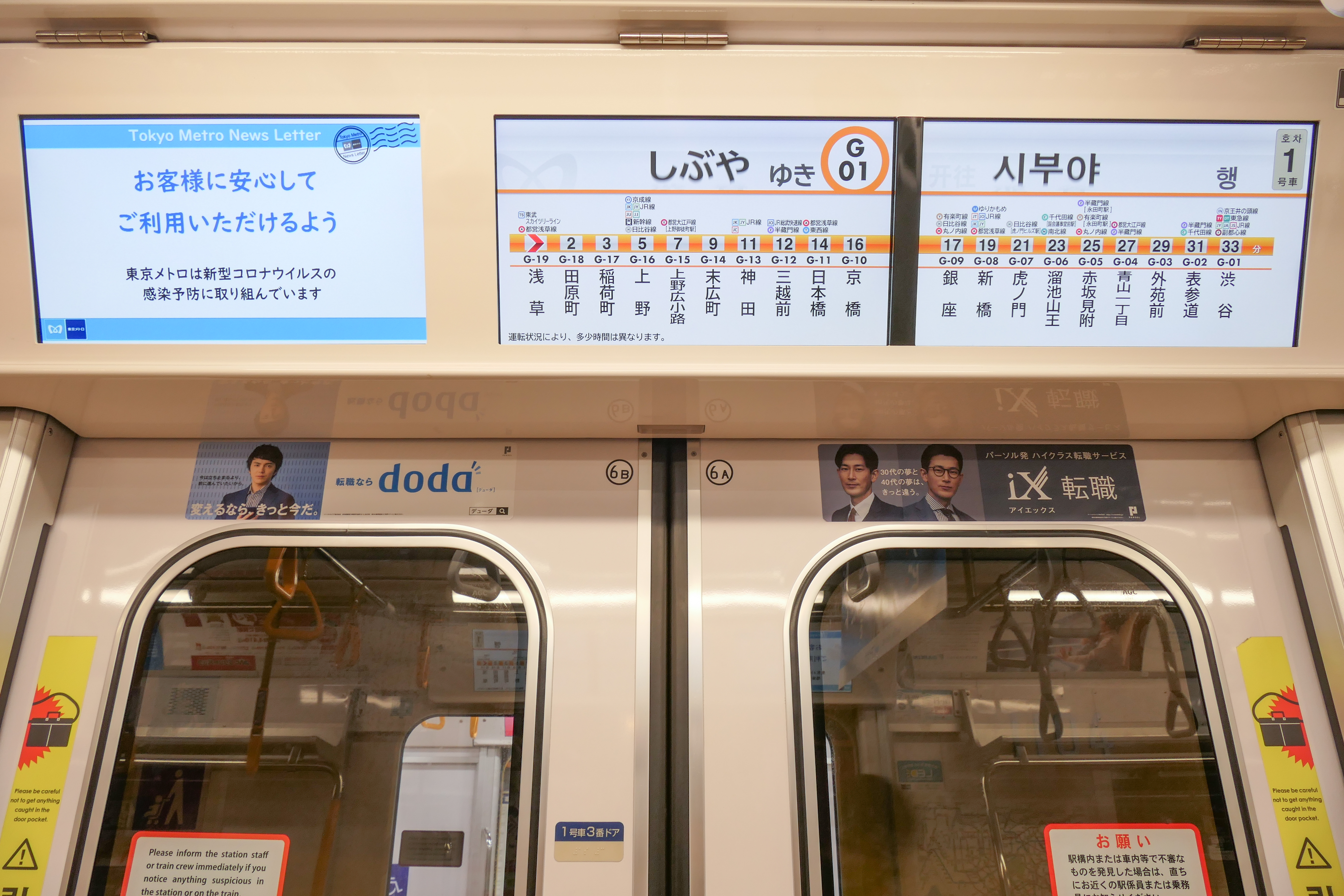
3-panel LCD passenger information displays in sets 1134 onwards

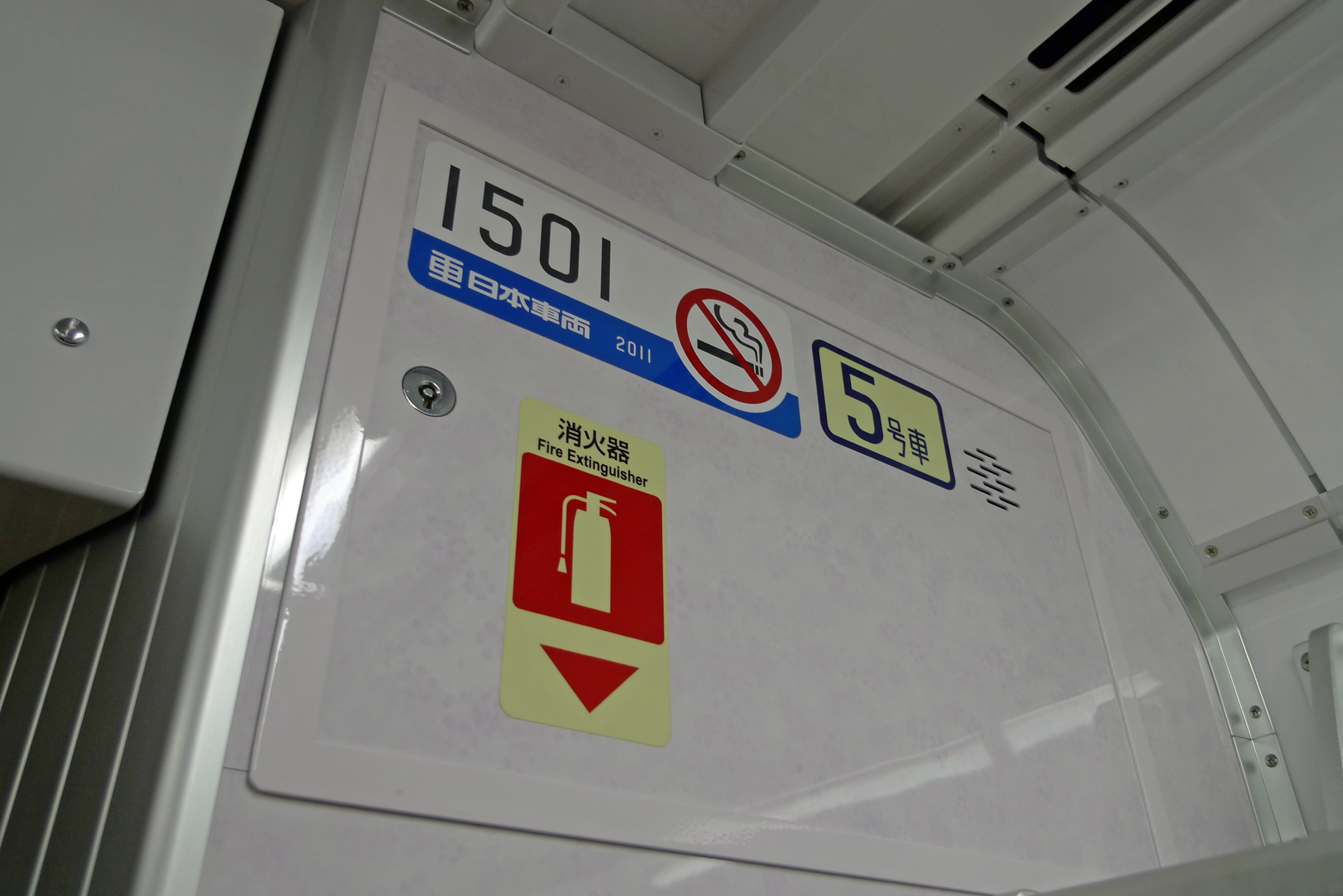
car number plate as used on the 1000 series, which also displays the builder, Nippon Sharyo

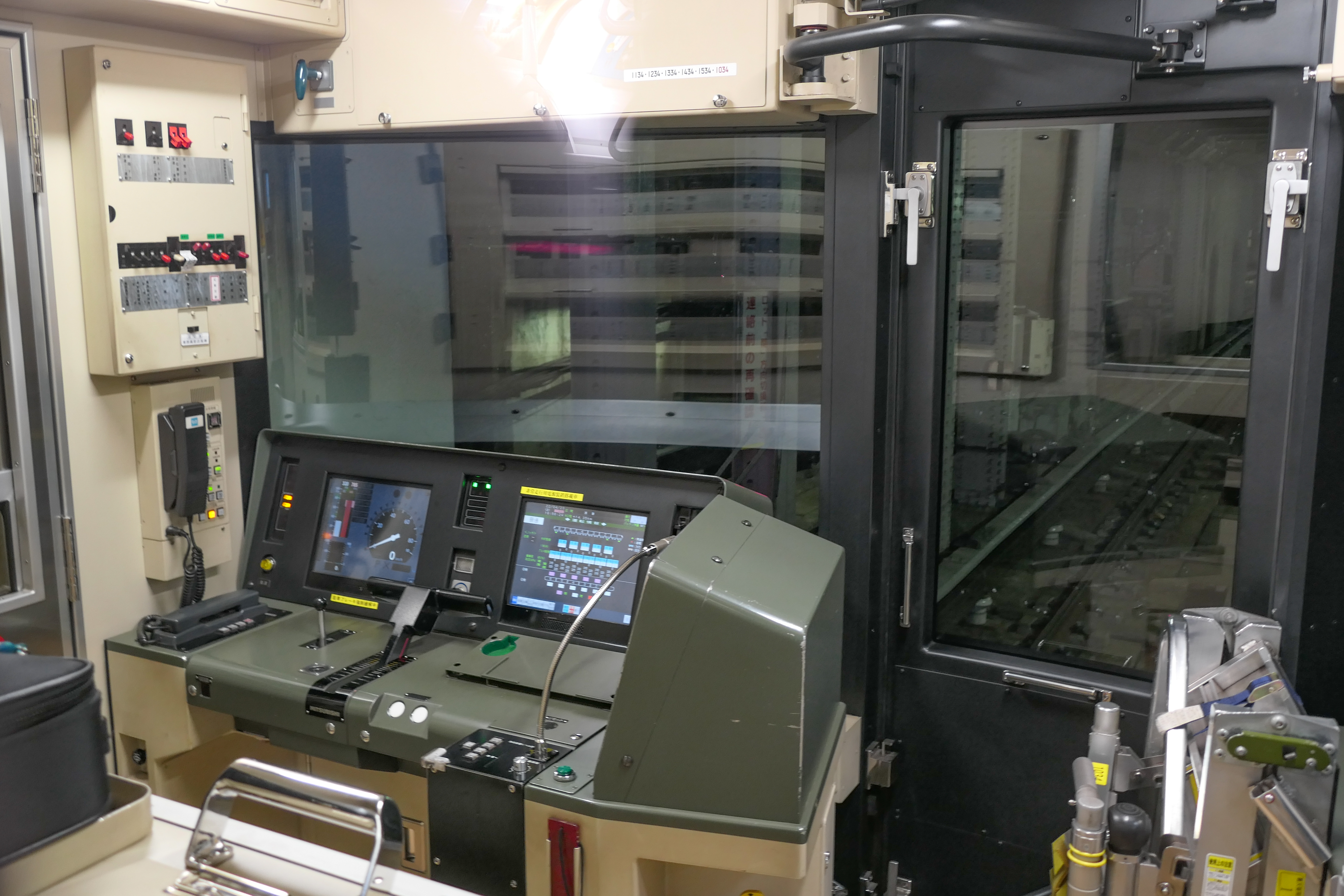
driver's cab of the 1000 series

=== Sets 1139 and 1140 ===
Sets 1139 and 1140 have retro-style interiors, with brass-coloured handrails and wood-grain effect walls, to closely resemble the original 1000 series trains. The LED lighting in these two sets can be altered to give an old-fashioned tungsten-lighting effect when used on special-event services.

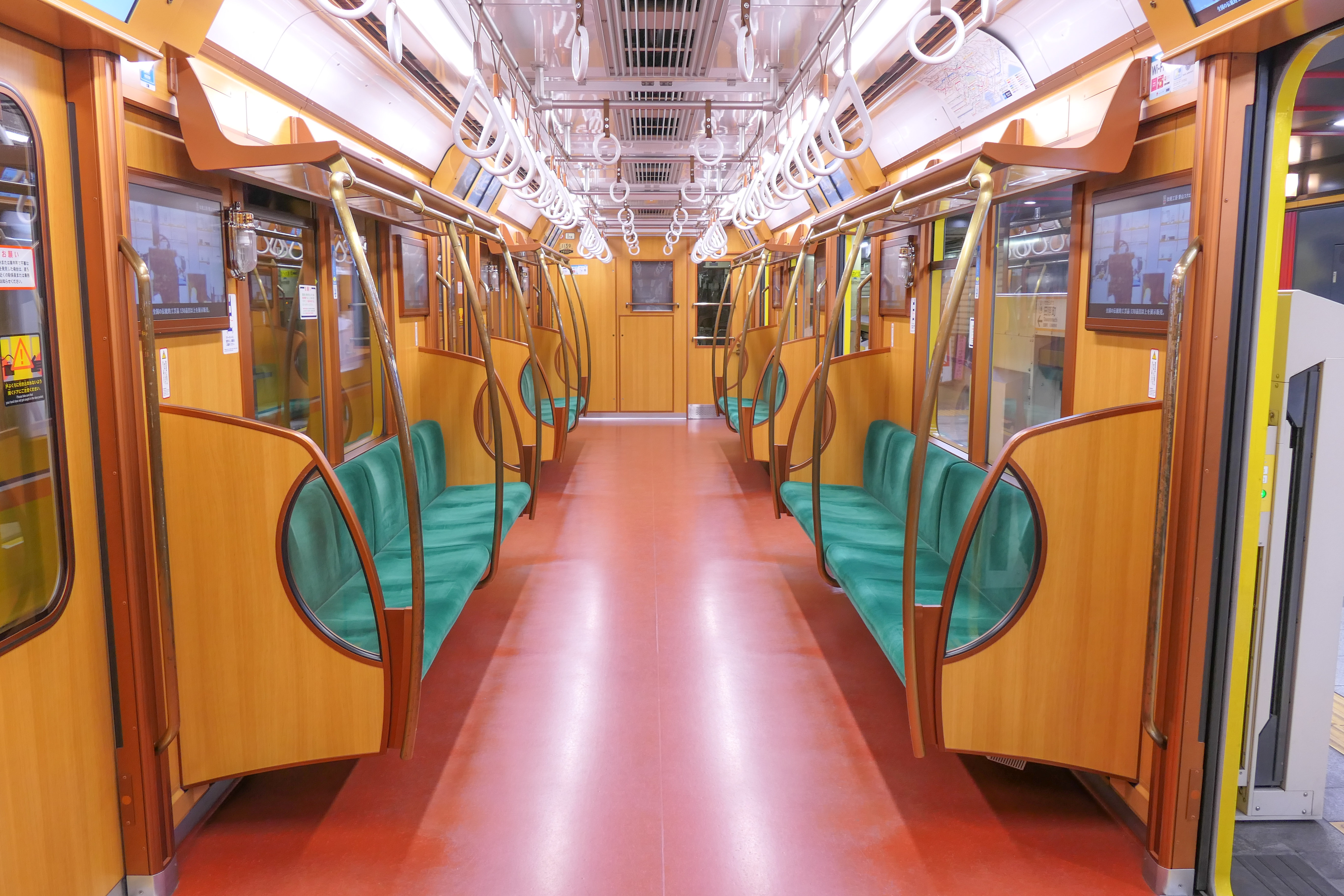
The interior of set 1139 in February 2021, with special retro-style interior

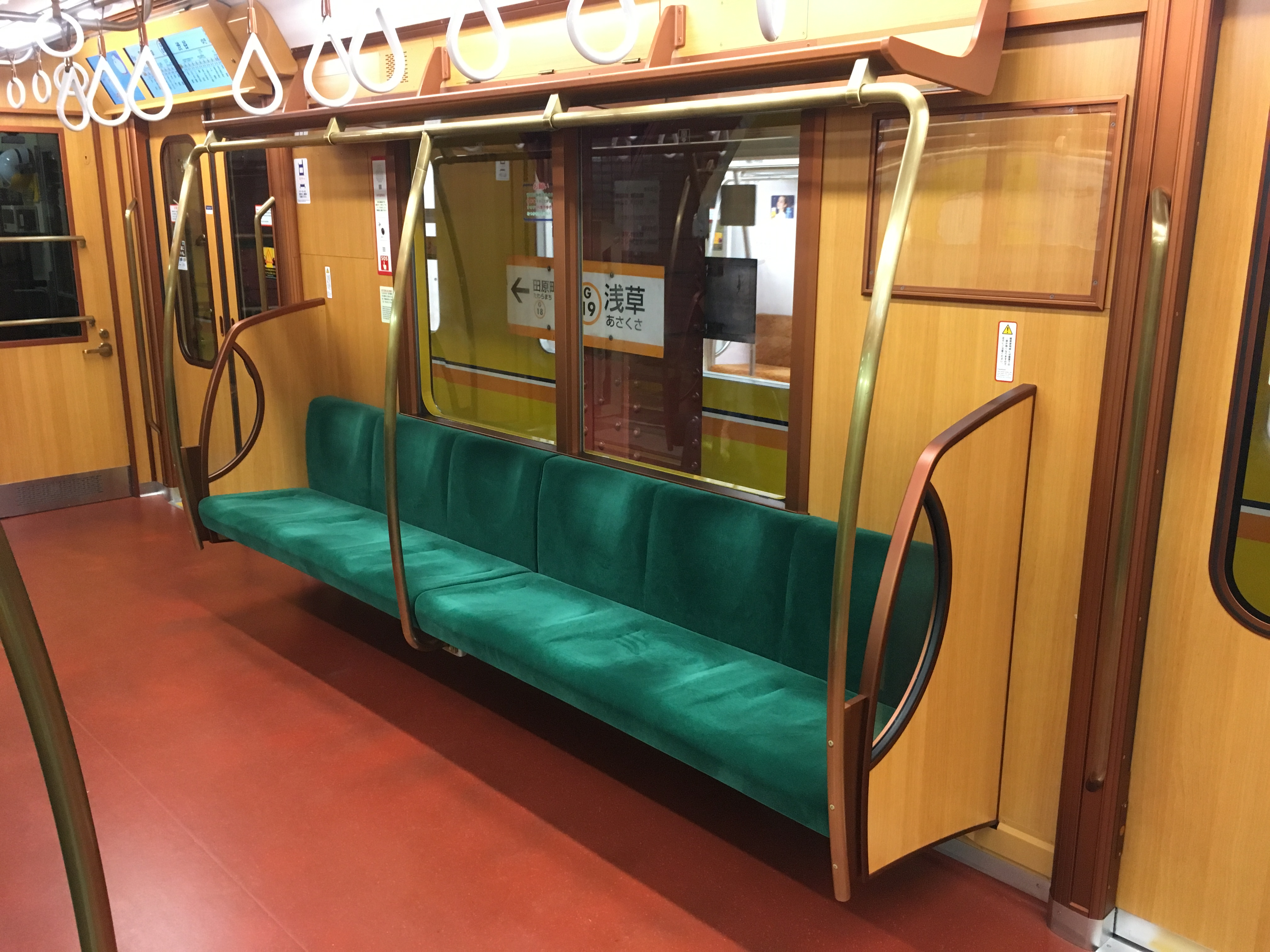
Bench seating inside set 1139 in May 2017, with special retro-style interior

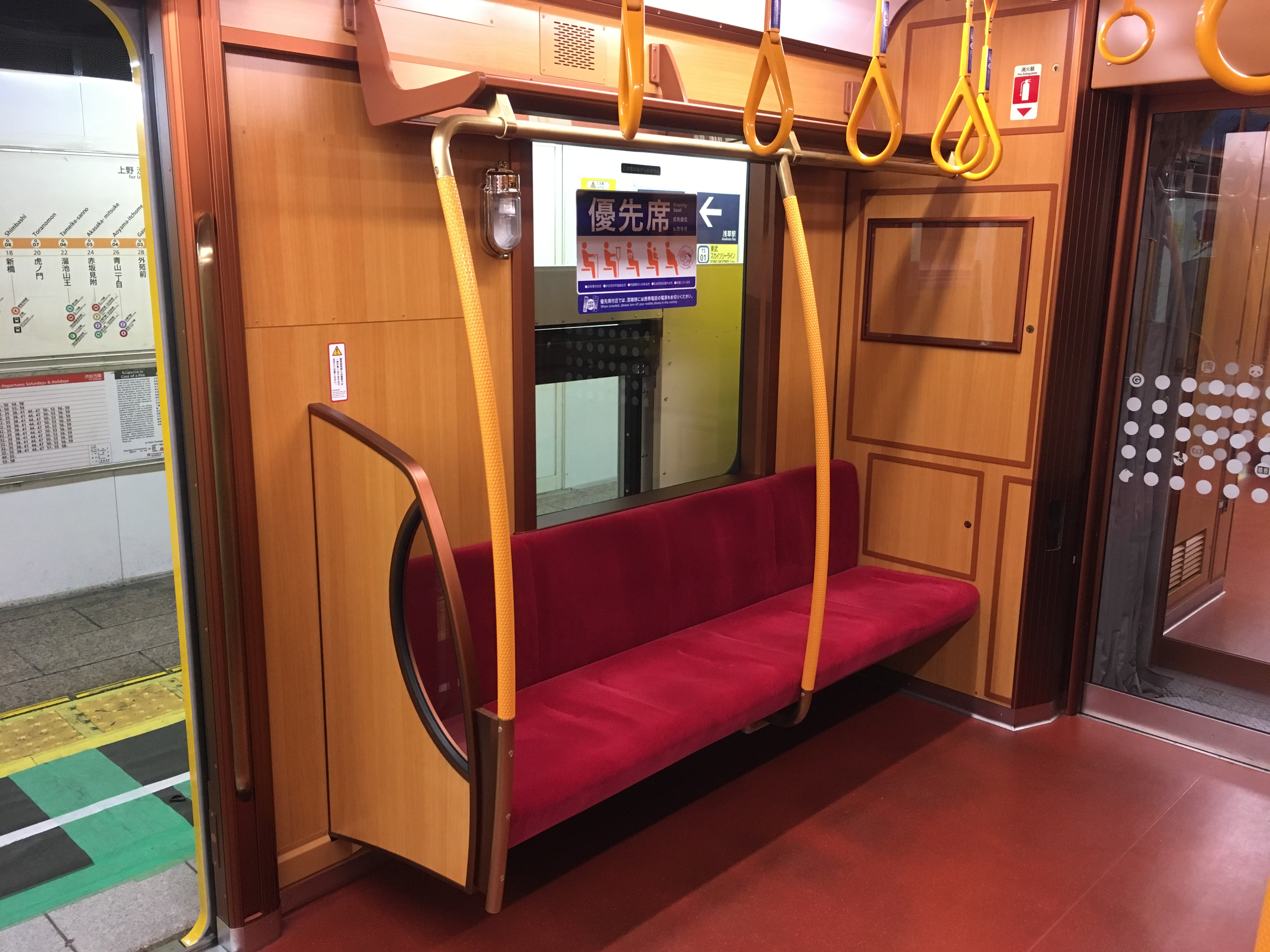
Priority seating inside set 1139 in May 2017, with special retro-style interior

== History ==
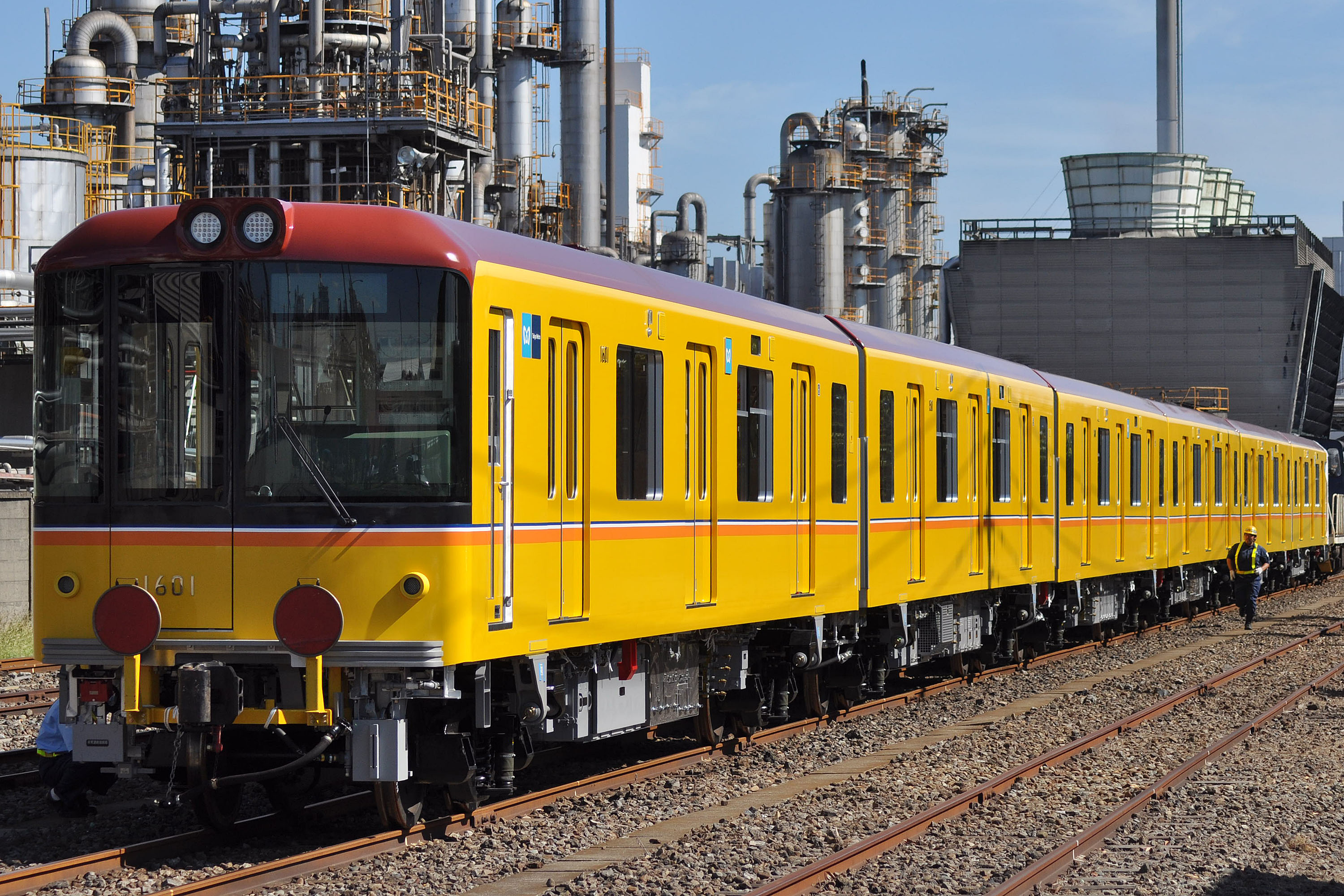
The first set on delivery in September 2011

The first set was delivered from Nippon Sharyo in Toyokawa, Aichi on 17 September 2011. It entered service on the Ginza Line from 11 April 2012. The second set was delivered from Nippon Sharyo in April 2013. The 40th and final set entered service on 12 March 2017.

== Fleet details ==
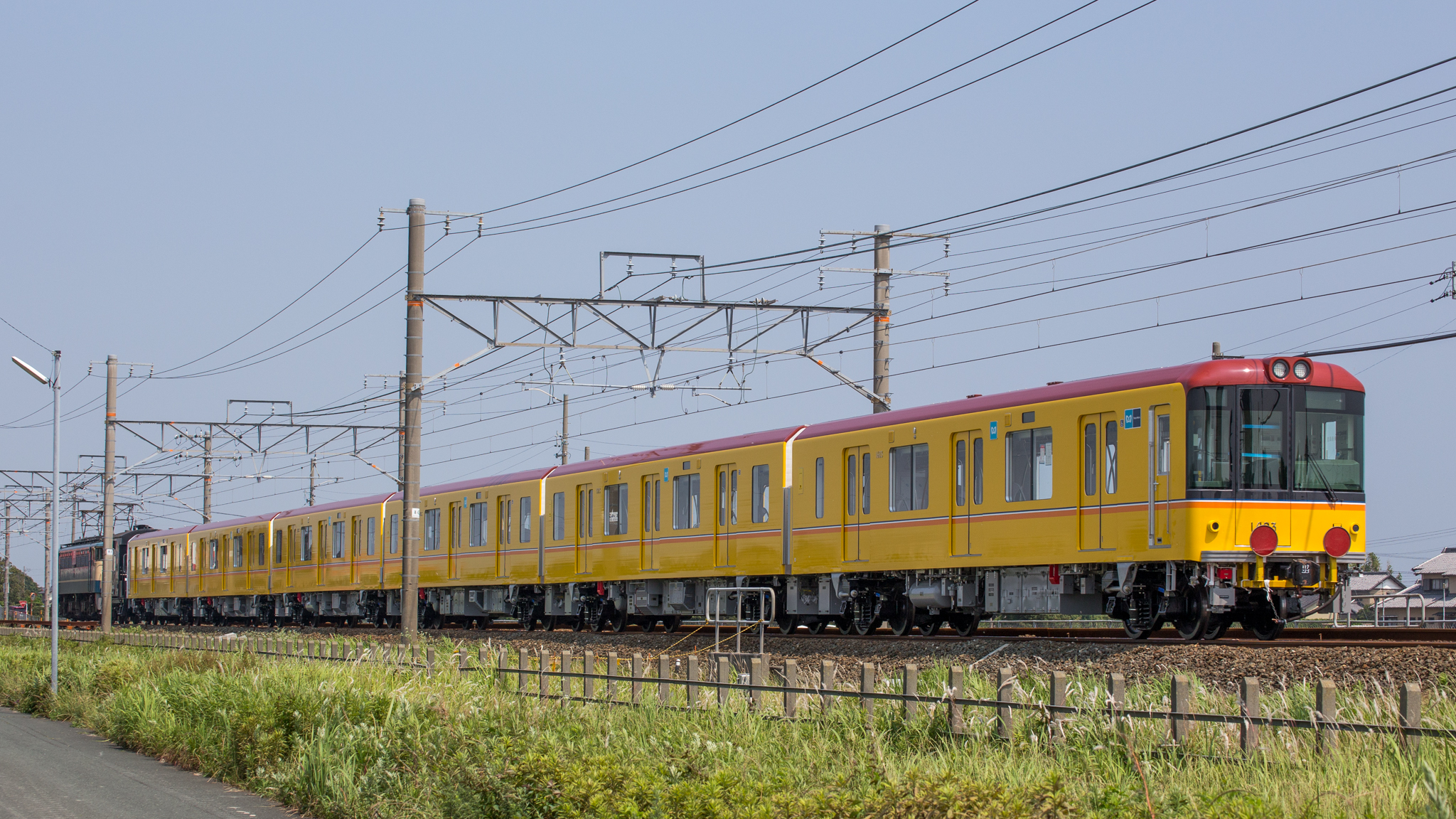
Set 1103 on delivery in June 2013

By 12 March 2017, all 40 sets were in operation. Official delivery dates as follows.

Set No.	Date delivered
1101	September 2011
1102	30 May 2013
1103	27 June 2013
1104	25 July 2013
1105	22 August 2013
1106	19 September 2013
1107	7 November 2013
1108	28 November 2013
1109	19 December 2013
1110	16 January 2014
1111	27 February 2014
1112	20 March 2014
1113	24 April 2014
1114	22 May 2014
1115	19 June 2014
1116	25 July 2014
1117	21 August 2014
1118	18 September 2014
1119	23 October 2014
1120	20 November 2014
1121	23 April 2015
1122	18 June 2015
1123	23 July 2015
1124	20 August 2015
1125	17 September 2015
1126	22 October 2015
1127	26 November 2015
1128	6 January 2016
1129	31 January 2016
1130	2 March 2016
1131	24 March 2016
1132	28 April 2016
1133	26 May 2016
1134	23 June 2016
1135	4 July 2016
1136	18 August 2016
1137	22 September 2016
1138	20 October 2016
1139	12 January 2017*
1140	9 March 2017*

*Classic design
