= Kumamoto Electric Railway 01 series =

Japanese train type

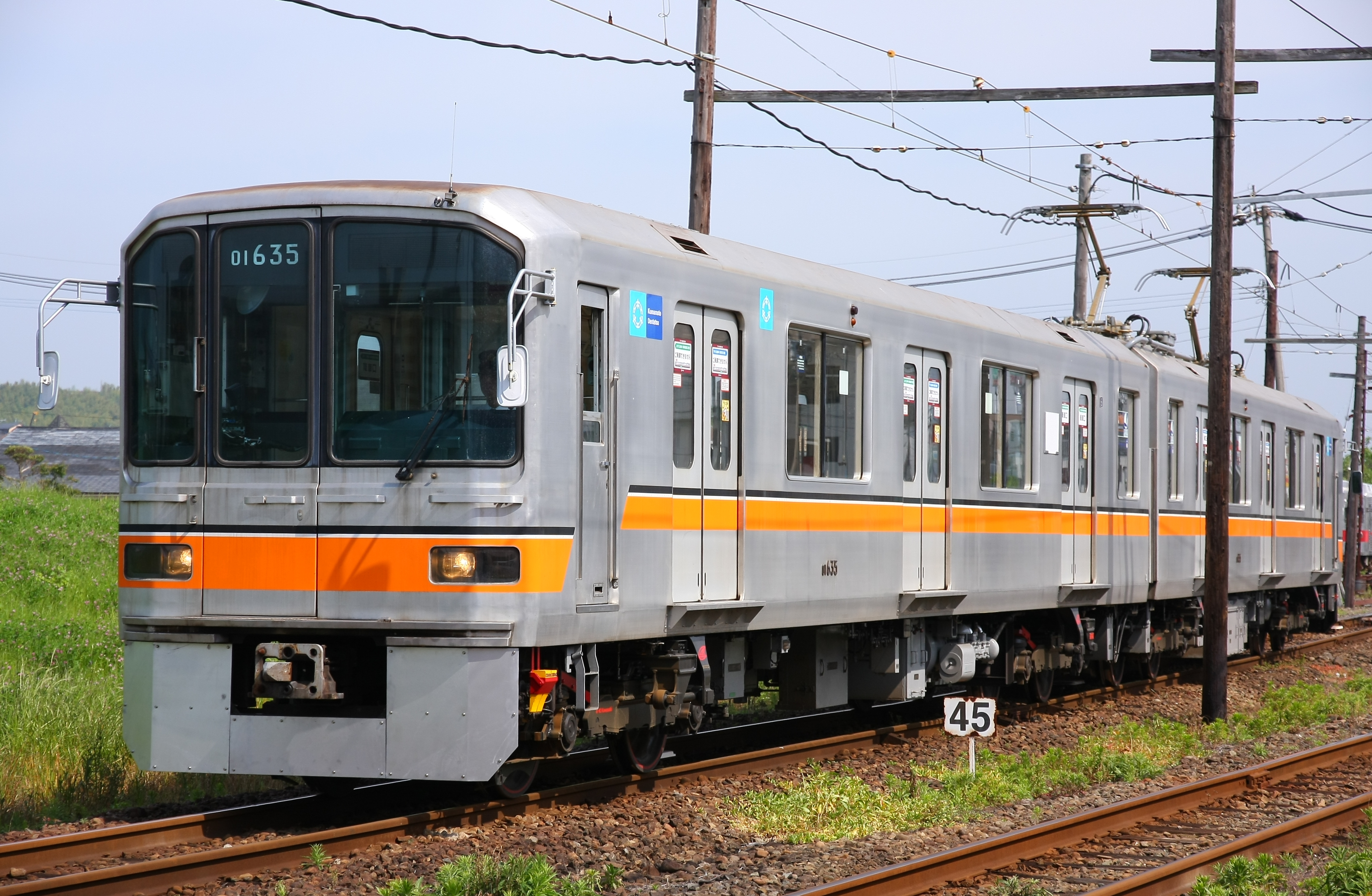
- Set 36 in May 2015
- Replaced: 5000 series
- Entered service: 16 March 2015
- Refurbished: 2015 (converted from former Tokyo Metro 01 series trains)
- Number built: 4 vehicles (2 sets)
- Number in service: 4 vehicles (2 sets)
- Formation: 2 cars per trainset
- Fleet numbers: 35-36
- Operator: Kumamoto Electric Railway
- Depot: Kita-Kumamoto

Specifications
- Car body construction: Aluminium
- Car length: 16,000 mm (52 ft 6 in)
- Width: 2,998 mm (9 ft 10.0 in)
- Height: 4,007 mm (13 ft 1.8 in)
- Doors: 3 pairs per side
- Traction system: 4 x 160 kW IGBT-VVVF traction motors
- Electric system: 600 V DC
- Current collection: Overhead conductor
- Bogies: KW206
- Safety system: ATS
- Track gauge: 1,067 mm (3 ft 6 in)

The Kumamoto Electric Railway 01 series (熊本電気鉄道01形) is a DC electric multiple unit (EMU) train type operated by the private railway operator Kumamoto Electric Railway in Japan, since 16 March 2015.

== Design ==
The two-car trains were rebuilt from 2015 from former Tokyo Metro 01 series six-car trains, by adding two single-arm pantographs and new KW206 "efWing" carbon-reinforced plastic 1,067 mm (3 ft 6 in) bogies built by Kawasaki Heavy Industries.

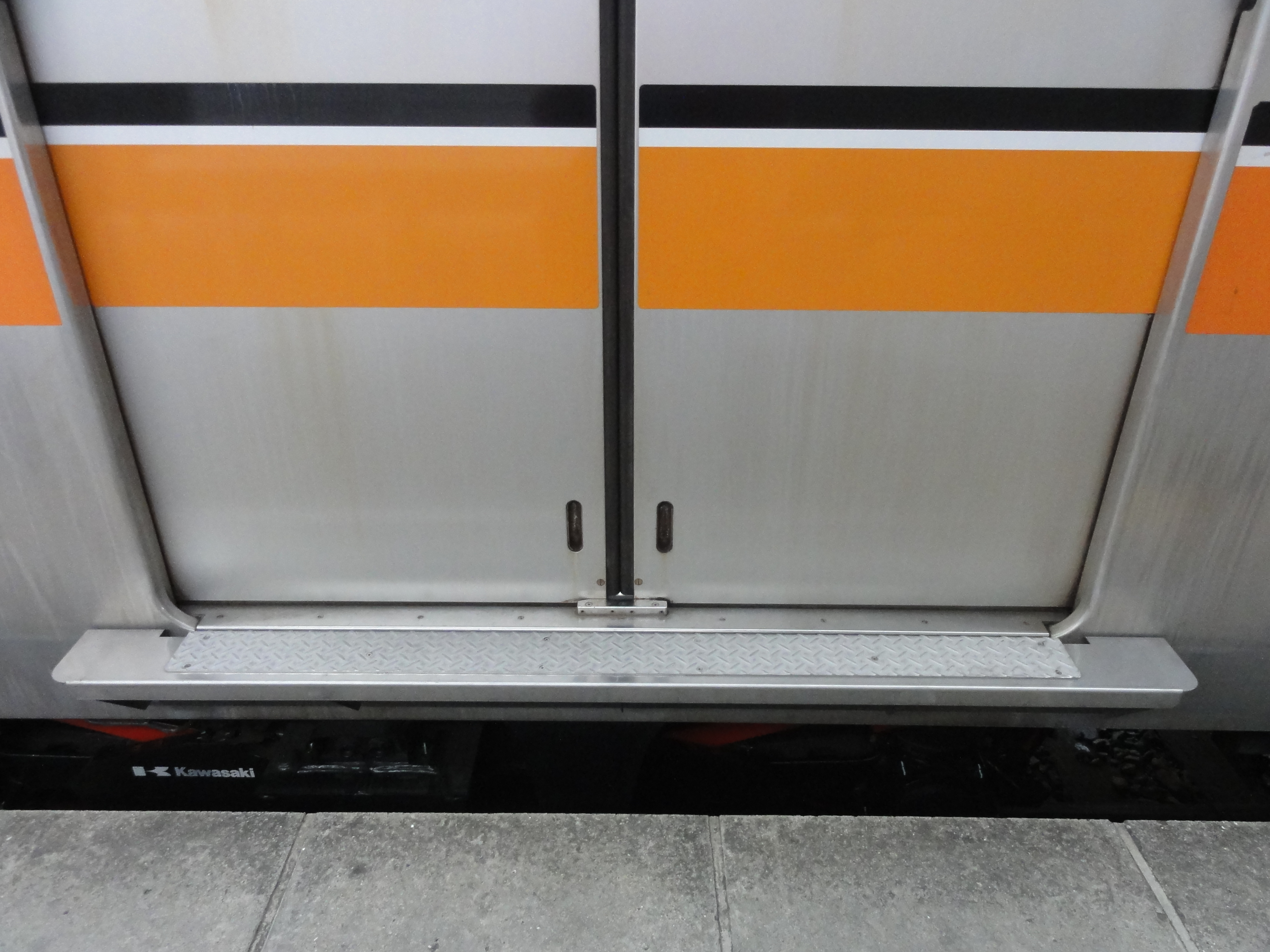
A doorstep added to the trains on conversion

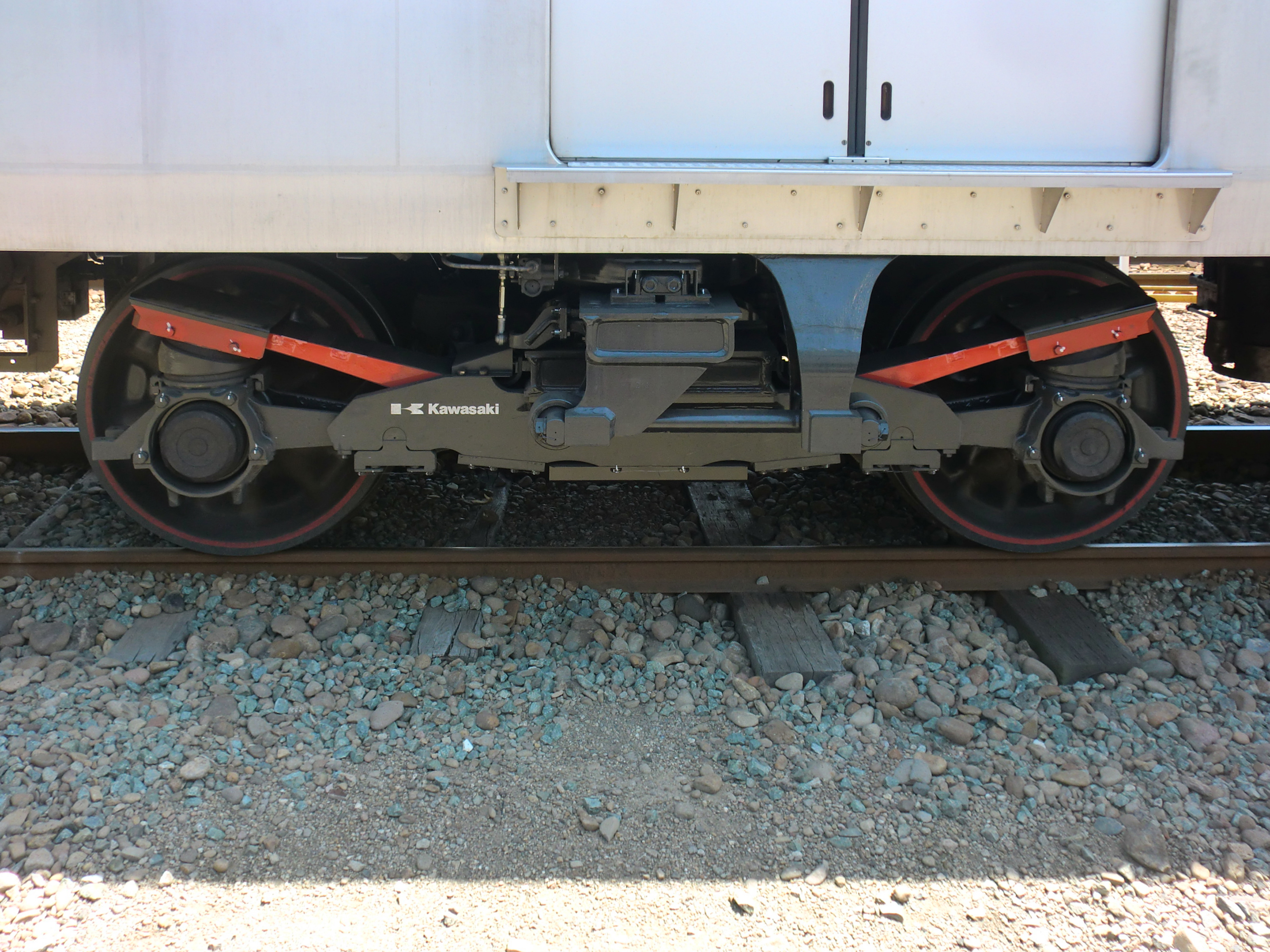
A KW206 "efWing" bogie

== Formations ==
As of 1 April 2016 two two-car sets (numbers 35 and 36) are in operation, formed as follows with one motored car ("Mc") and one non-powered trailer car ("Tc").

Designation	Mc	Tc
Numbering	01-13x	01-63x
Weight (t)	32.0	26.8
Capacity (total/seated)	102/32	101/36

The Mc cars have two single-arm pantographs.

== Interior ==
Passenger accommodation consists of longitudinal bench seating.

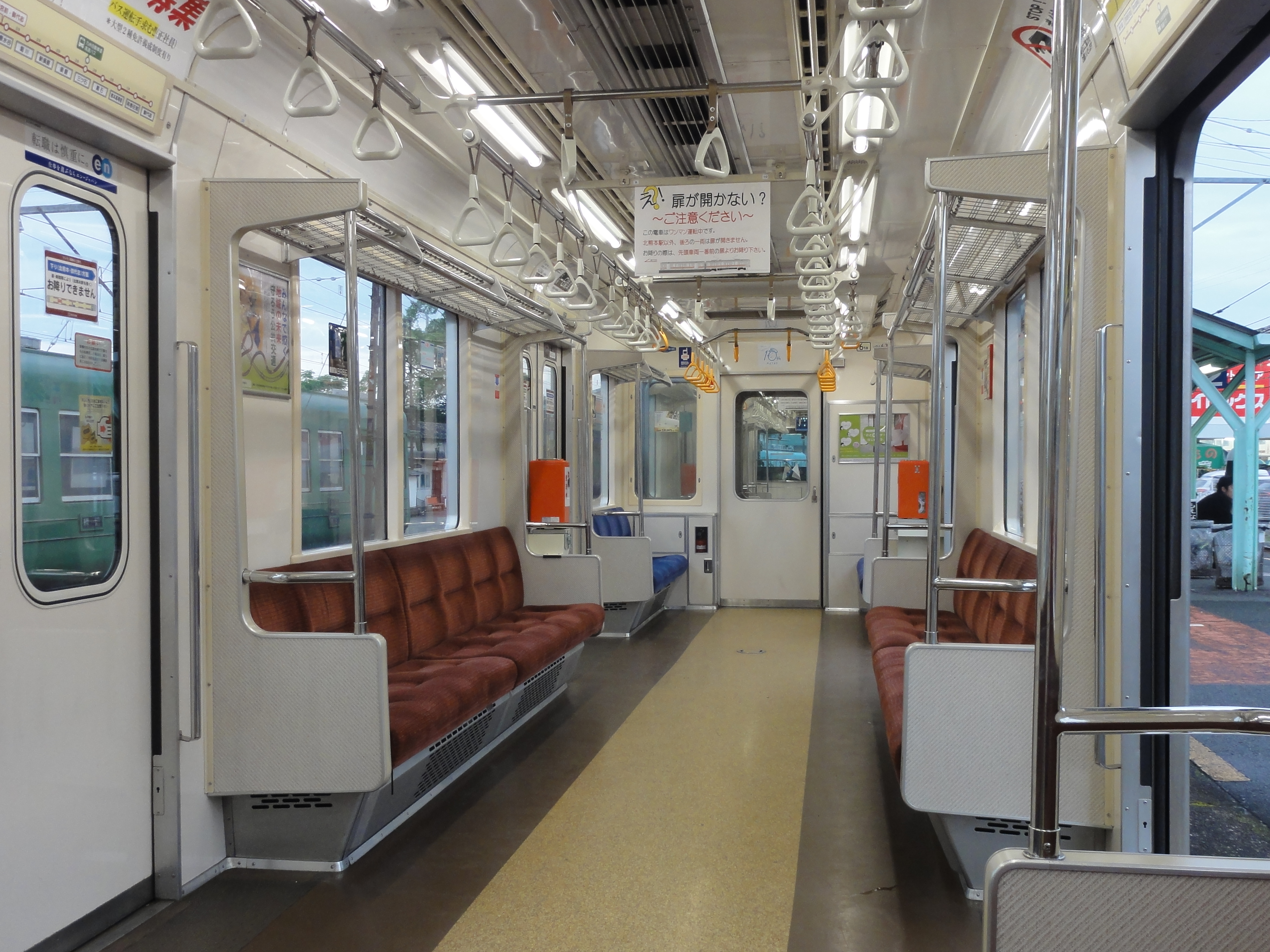
The interior of car 01-636 in May 2015

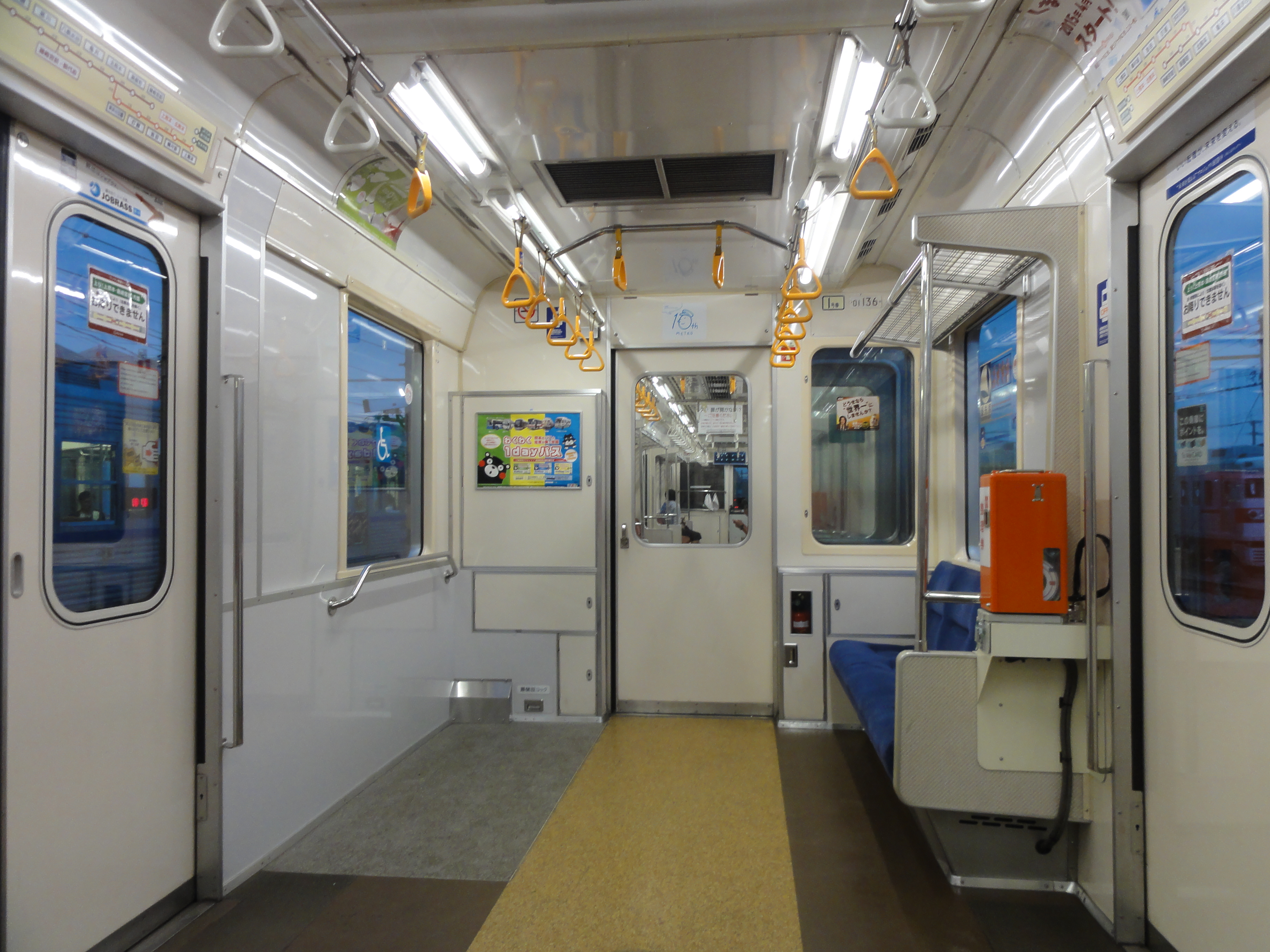
The interior of car 01-136 with wheelchair space in May 2015

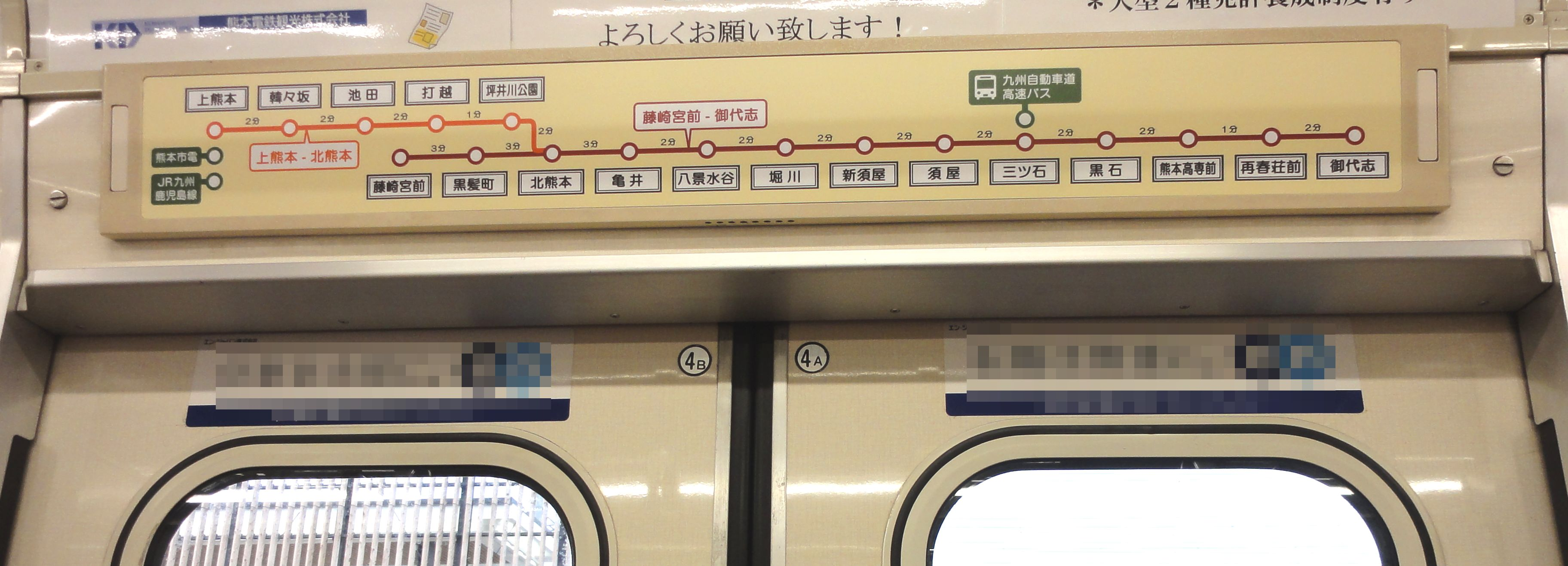
A passenger information indicator above the doorway

== History ==
Former Tokyo Metro 01 series driving cars 01-136 and 01-636 were sold to the Kumamoto Electric Railway in February 2015. The modified two-car set entered service on 16 March 2015. Two more cars, 01-135 and 01-635, were acquired during fiscal 2015.

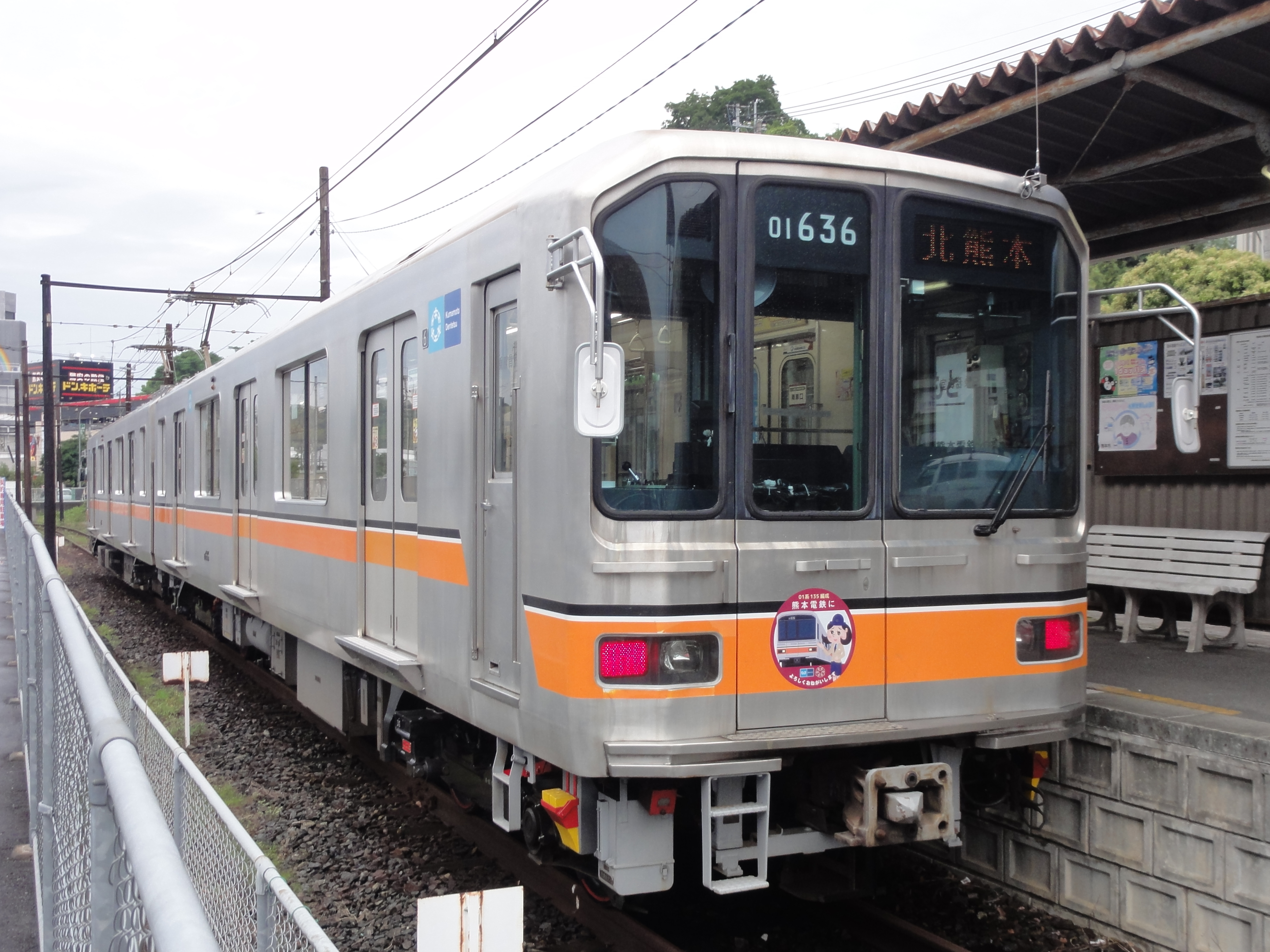
Set 36 in service in May 2015 with a commemorative headboard sticker on the front

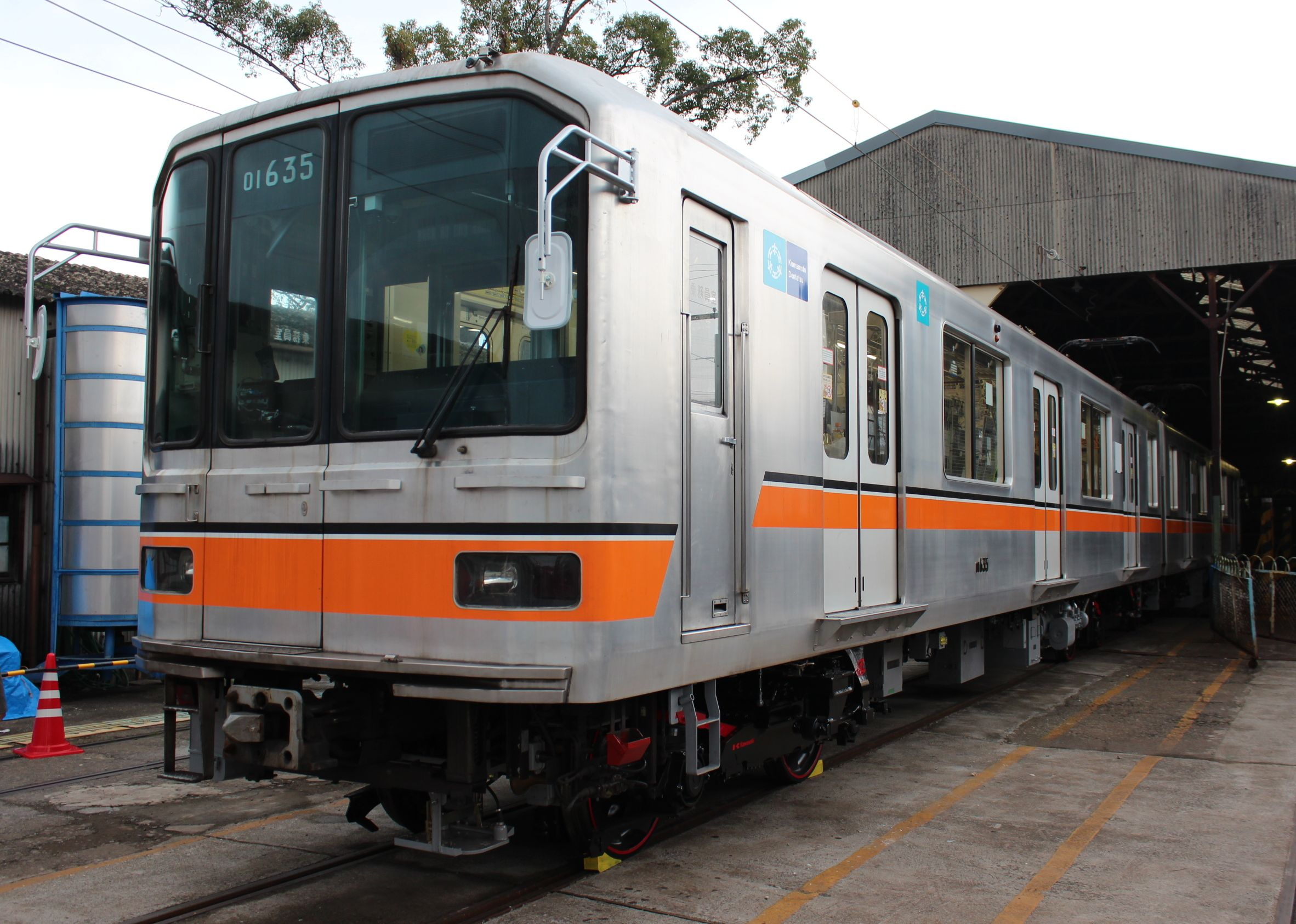
Set 35 in February 2016
