= 817 series =

Japanese electric multiple unit train type

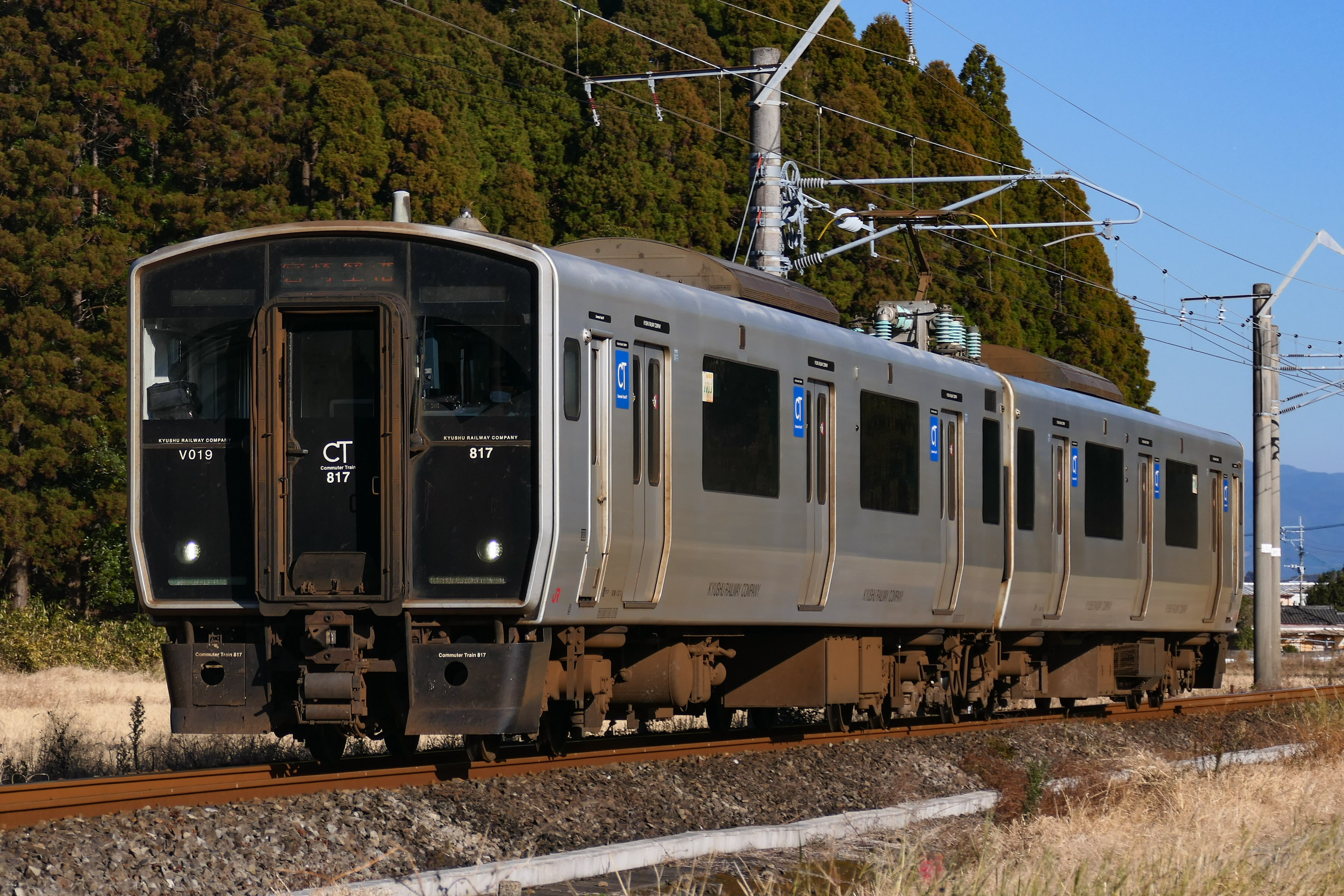
- Kagoshima-based 817-0 series set VK019 in December 2024
- Manufacturer: Hitachi
- Family name: Hitachi A-train
- Replaced: 457 series, 475 series, 717 series
- Constructed: 2001–2015
- Entered service: October 2001
- Number built: 145 vehicles (67 sets)
- Number in service: 145 vehicles (67 sets)
- Formation: 2/3 cars per trainset
- Fleet numbers: V001–V003, V005–V031; V101–V108, V110–V114; V504; V1101–V1104; V1509; V2001–V2007; V3001–V3011
- Operator: JR Kyushu
- Depots: Kagoshima, Kumamoto, Minami-Fukuoka, Nagasaki, Nōgata

Specifications
- Car body construction: Aluminium
- Car length: 20,000 mm (65 ft 7 in)
- Width: 2,994 mm (9 ft 10 in)
- Height: 4,096 mm (13 ft 5 in)
- Floor height: 1,115 mm (3 ft 8 in)
- Doors: 3 pairs per side
- Maximum speed: 120 km/h (75 mph)
- Electric system: 20 kV 60 Hz AC (overhead catenary)
- Current collection: Pantograph
- Multiple working: 811/813/815 series
- Track gauge: 1,067 mm (3 ft 6 in)

The 817 series (817系) is an AC electric multiple unit (EMU) train type operated on commuter and local services by Kyushu Railway Company (JR Kyushu) in Japan since 2001. The design was based on the earlier 815 series, with transverse seating replacing the previous longitudinal seating, although later variants reverted to longitudinal seating.

== Variants ==
There are five sub-series variants, 817-0, 817-1000, 817-1100, 817-2000, and 817-3000 series, allocated to five depots, Kagoshima, Kumamoto, Minami-Fukuoka, Nagasaki, and Nōgata. The trains carry large colour-coded stickers next to the passenger doors according to the depot.

- Kagoshima (817-0 series): Blue
- Kumamoto (817-0 series): Green
- Minami-Fukuoka (817-3000 series): Orange
- Nagasaki (817-0 series): Red
- Nōgata (817-1000, 817-1100, 817-2000 series): Yellow
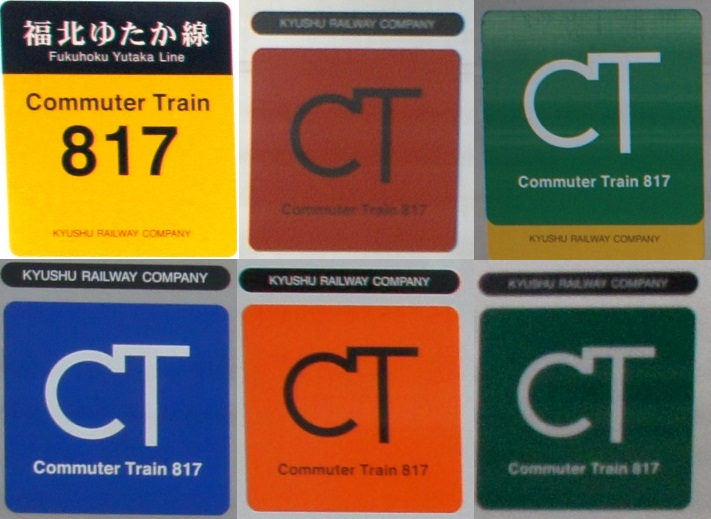
Colour-coded bodyside stickers

== 817-0/-500 series ==
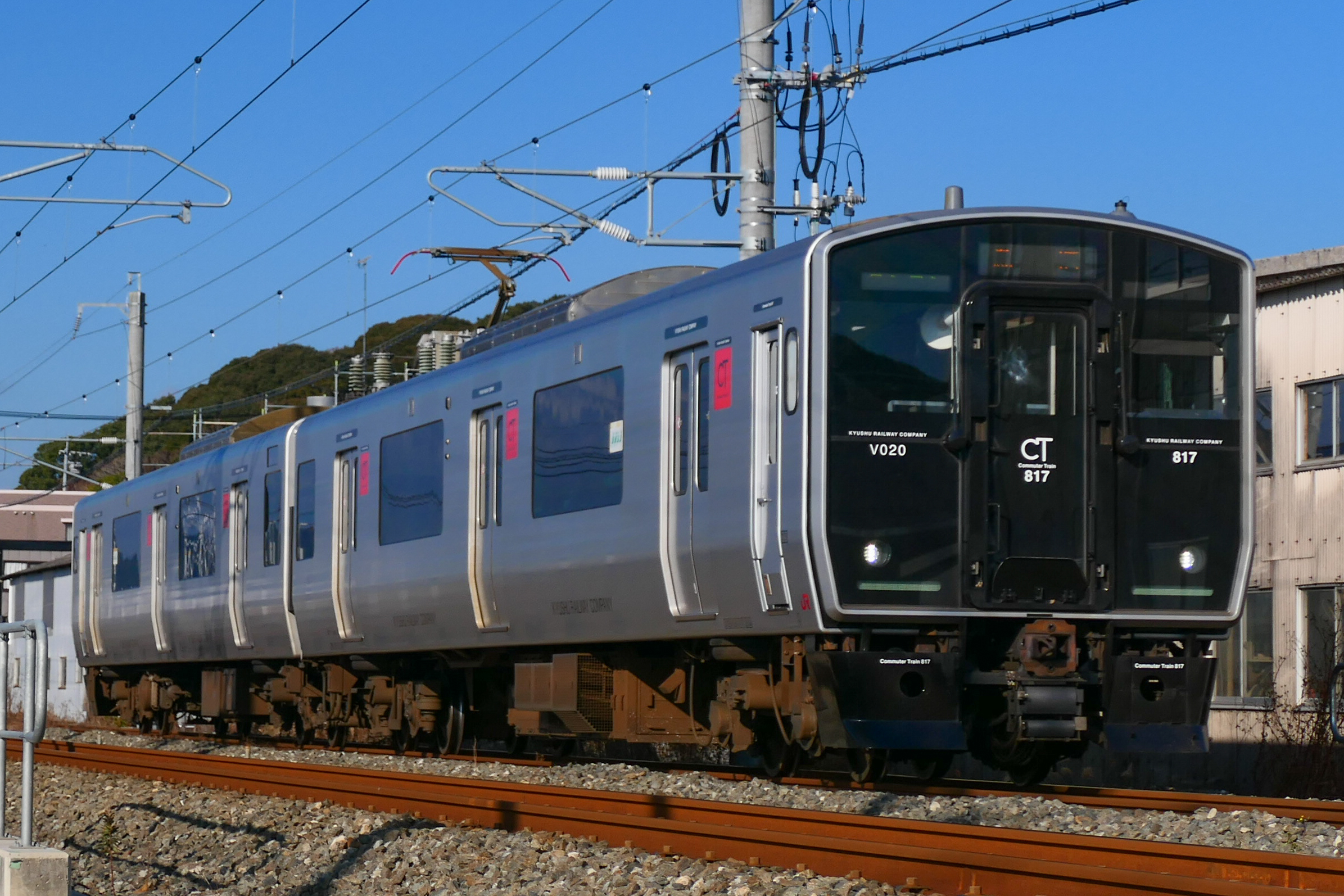
Nagasaki-based 817-0 series set V020 in January 2023

31 two-car sets (V001 to V031) were delivered to Minami-Fukuoka and Nōgata depots between August September 2001 for use on the newly electrified Fukuhoku Yutaka Line, Nagasaki Main Line, and Sasebo Line.

The 31 sets were later reallocated to Kagoshima, Kumamoto, and Nagasaki depots from 2003 following the arrival of 817-1000 series sets.

In fiscal 2020, set V004's transverse seating was replaced with longitudinal seating. It was given the classification 817-500 series and renumbered V504.

=== Formation ===
Numbering	KuMoHa 817	KuHa 816
Capacity total/seated	131/50	127/40

The KuMoHa 817 car is fitted with a PS401K single-arm pantograph.

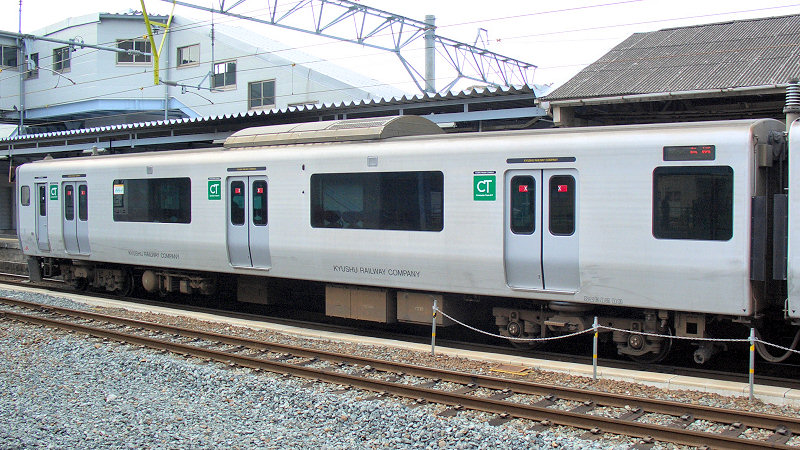
KuHa 816-13 of Kumamoto-based set V013 in December 2007

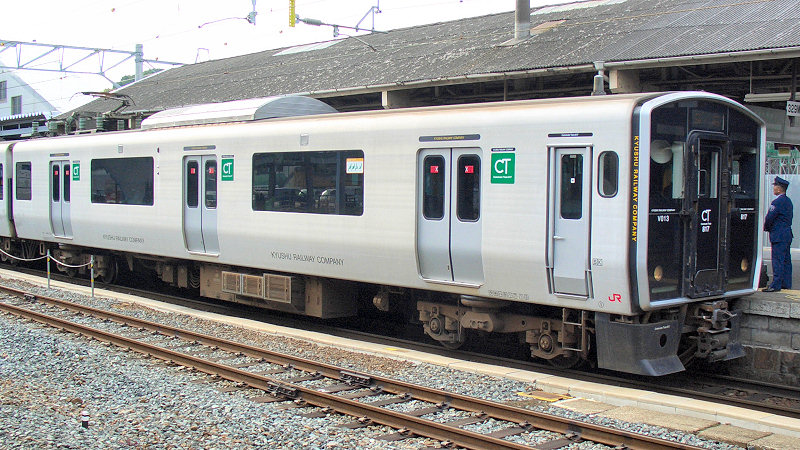
KuMoHa 817-13 of Kumamoto-based set V013 in December 2007

=== Interior ===
Seating is arranged in a transverse configuration, with flip-over seat backs to face the direction of travel. The KuHa 816 car has a toilet and a wheelchair space.

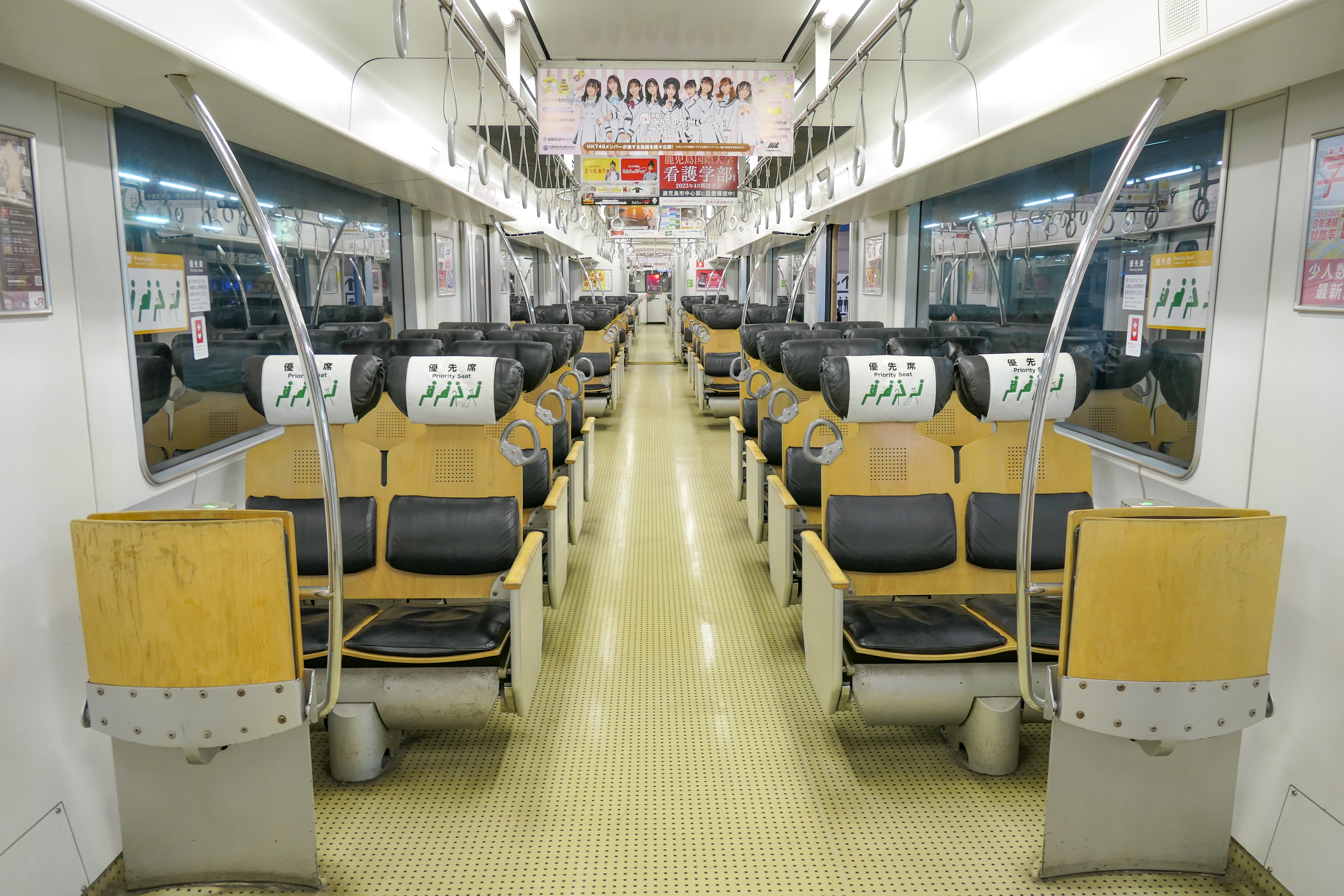
Interior view

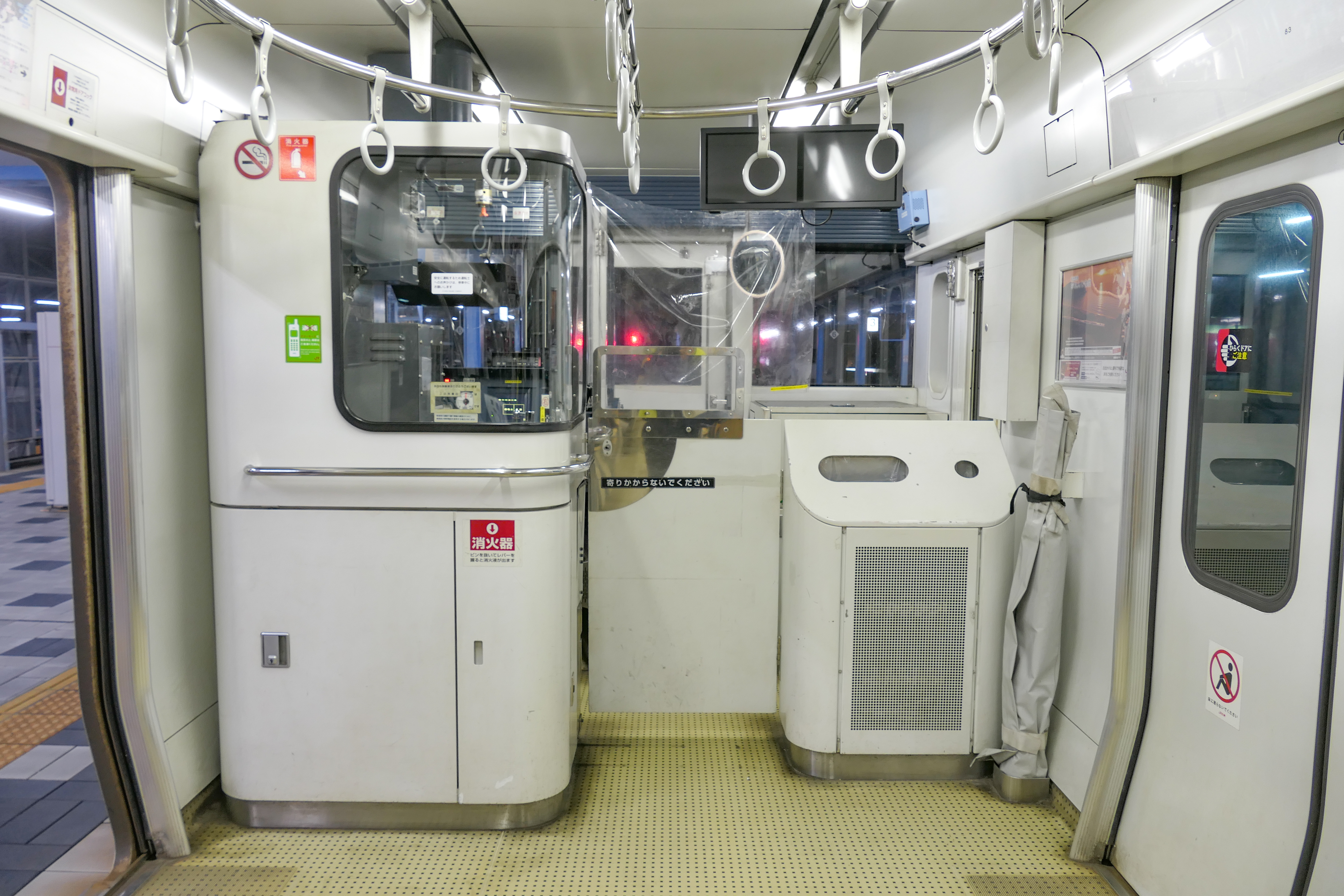
Behind the cab

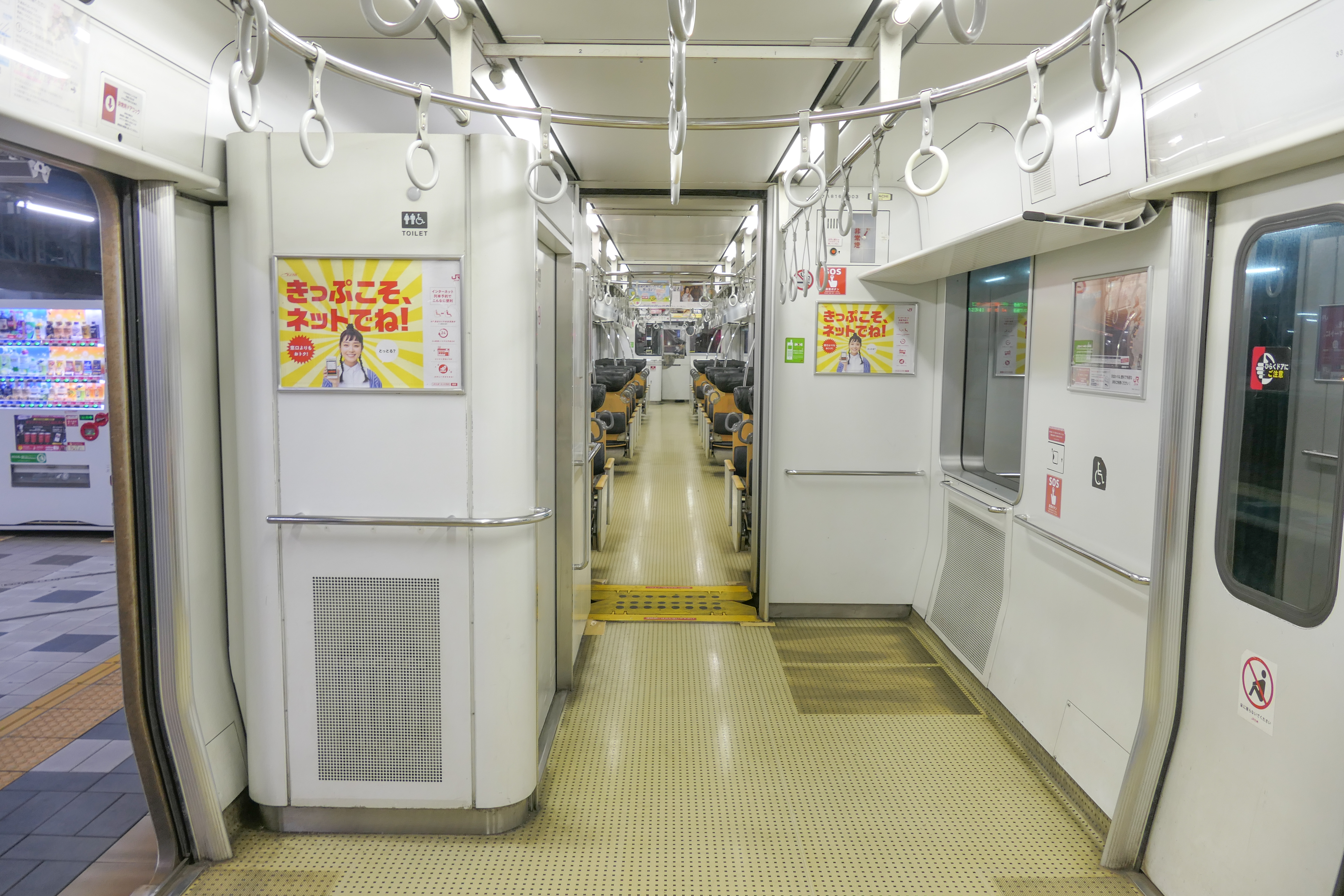
Toilet and wheelchair space

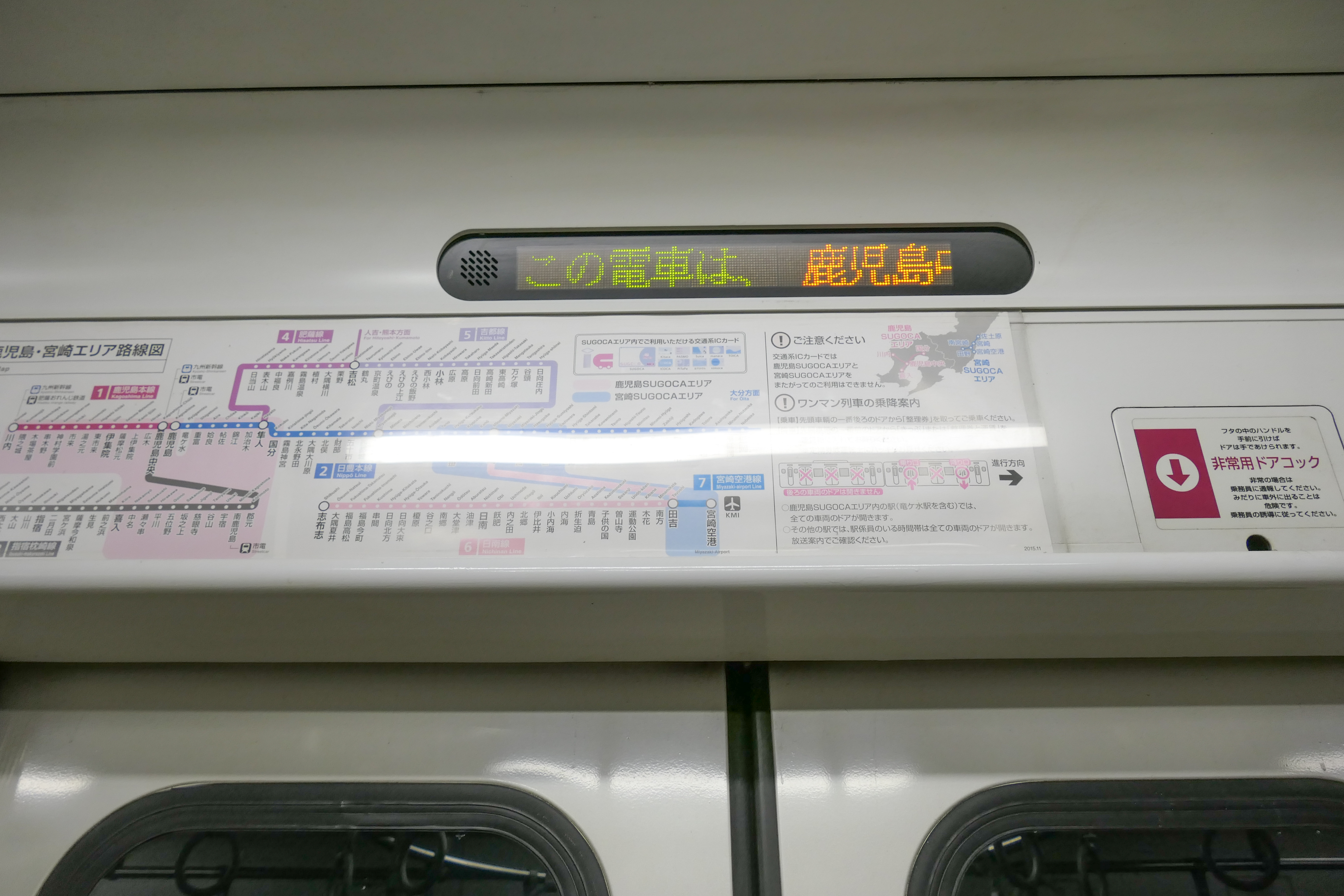
LED display

== 817-1000/-1500 series ==
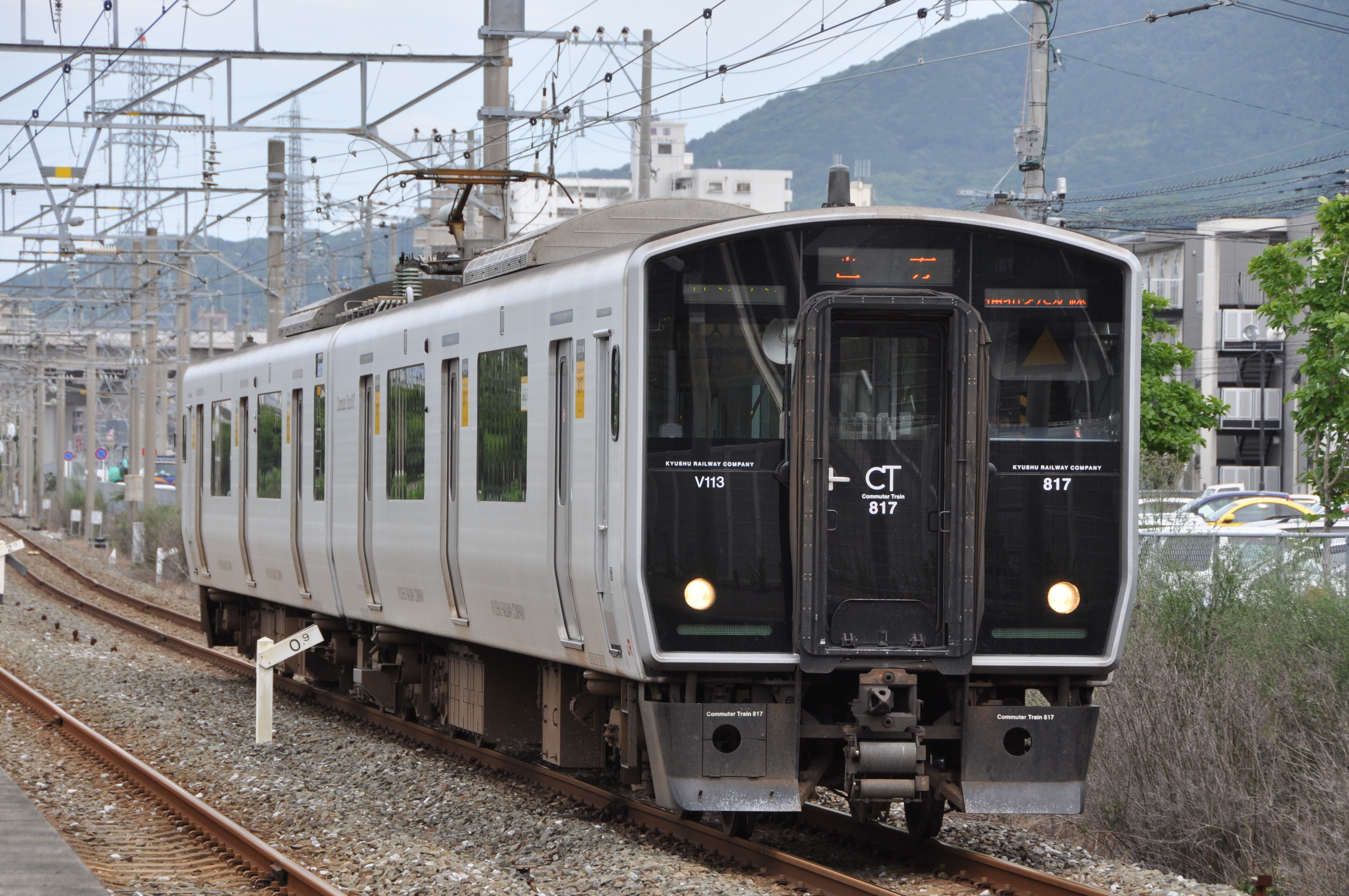
Nōgata-based 817-1000 series set V113 in July 2011

12 second-batch 817-1000 series two-car sets (V101 to V112) were delivered to Nōgata depot between August and September 2003, displacing the earlier 817-0 series sets based there. These sets were designed to be able to be lengthened easily to three-cars sets in the future if needed. A further two third-batch sets (V113 and V114) were added in February 2005.

In 2022, set V109's transverse seating was replaced with longitudinal seating. It was given the classification 817-1500 series and renumbered V1509.

=== Formation ===
Numbering	KuMoHa 817-1000	KuHa 816-1000
Capacity total/seated	131/50	127/40

The KuMoHa 817 car is fitted with a PS401K single-arm pantograph.

=== Interior ===
As with the 817-0 series, seating is arranged in a transverse configuration, with flip-over seat backs to face the direction of travel. The KuHa 816 car has a toilet and a wheelchair space.

=== Experimental battery EMU set ===
In March 2013, JR Kyushu converted two-car 817-1000 series set VG114 to a battery electric multiple unit (BEMU) by adding lithium-ion storage batteries to enable the train to run on non-electrified lines. The train has a maximum speed of 120 km/h (75 mph) when running off the 20 kV AC overhead power supply of electrified lines, and 80 km/h (50 mph) when running on battery power over non-electrified lines. It can run a distance of up to 30 km (20 mi) on battery power. The train was tested on non-electrified lines from September 2013.

== 817-1100 series ==
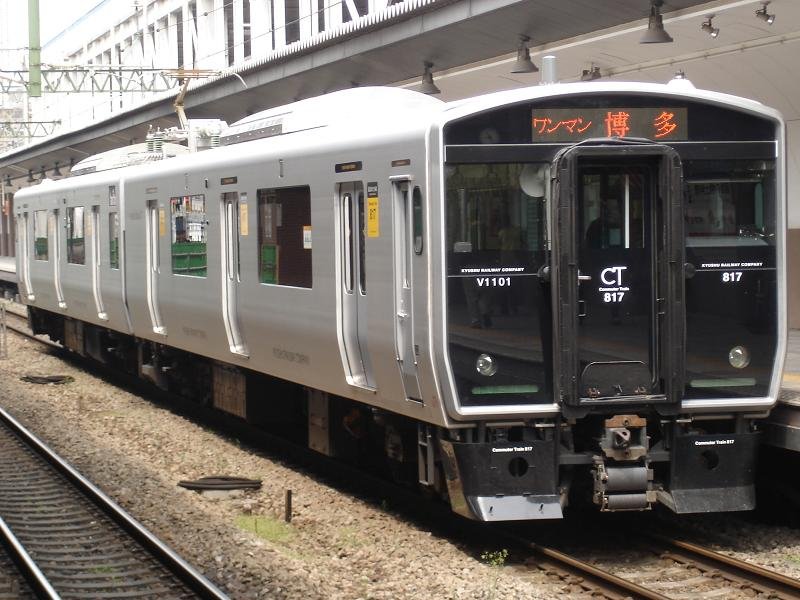
Set V1101 at Hakata Station in April 2007

Four fourth-batch two-car 817-1100 series sets (V1101 to V1104) were delivered to Nōgata depot in March 2007 to provide increased capacity on the Fukuhoku Yutaka Line. These were based on the earlier 817-1000 series, but with larger LED destination indicators on the cab ends.

=== Formation ===
As of 1 October 2017, the fleet consists of four two-car 817-1100 sets (V1101 to V1104), all based at Nōgata Depot, and formed as shown below.

Numbering	KuMoHa 817-1100	KuHa 816-1100
Capacity total/seated	131/50	127/40

The KuMoHa 817 car is fitted with a PS401K single-arm pantograph.

== 817-2000 series ==
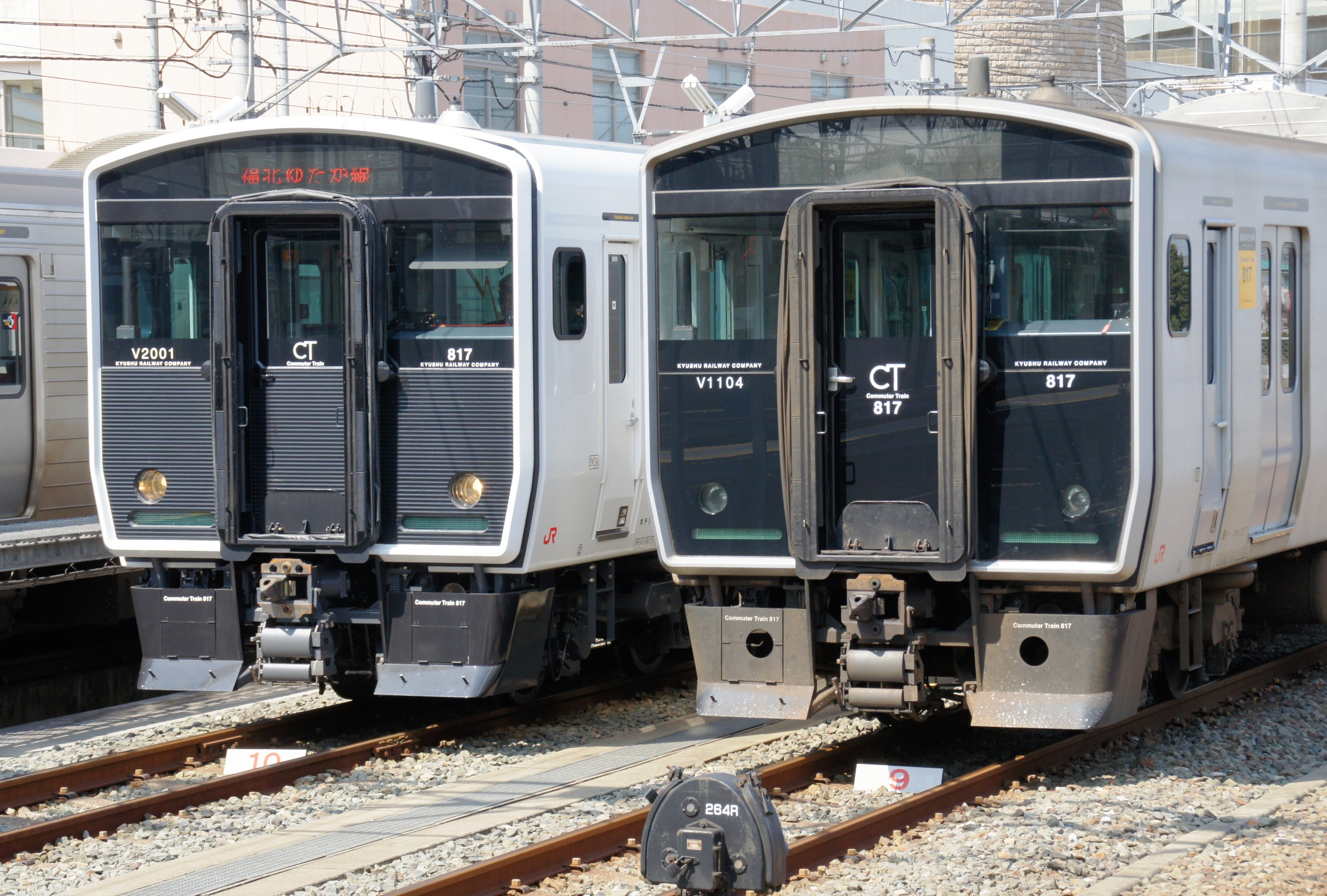
817-2000 series set V2001 (left) and 817-1100 series set V1104 (right) in March 2012

Six fifth-batch 817-2000 series two-car sets (V2001 to V2006) were delivered to Nōgata Depot from January 2012 for introduction on the Fukuhoku Yutaka Line from the start of the revised timetable on 17 March 2012. These sets have white-painted bodysides, and feature longitudinal seating to provide increased overall capacity and relieve overcrowding on the line. These sets feature interior LED lighting. They operate at a maximum speed of 100 km/h, although they have a maximum design speed of 120 km/h. A seventh set, V2007, was delivered in February 2013.

=== Formation ===
As of 1 October 2017, the fleet consists of seven two-car 817-2000 sets (V2001 to V2007), all based at Nōgata Depot, and formed as shown below.

Designation	Mc	Tc
Numbering	KuMoHa 817-2000	KuHa 816-2000
Weight (t)	35.2	28.0
Capacity total/seated	137/48	130/40

The KuMoHa 817 car is fitted with a PS401K single-arm pantograph. The KuHa 816 car has a toilet.

== 817-3000 series ==
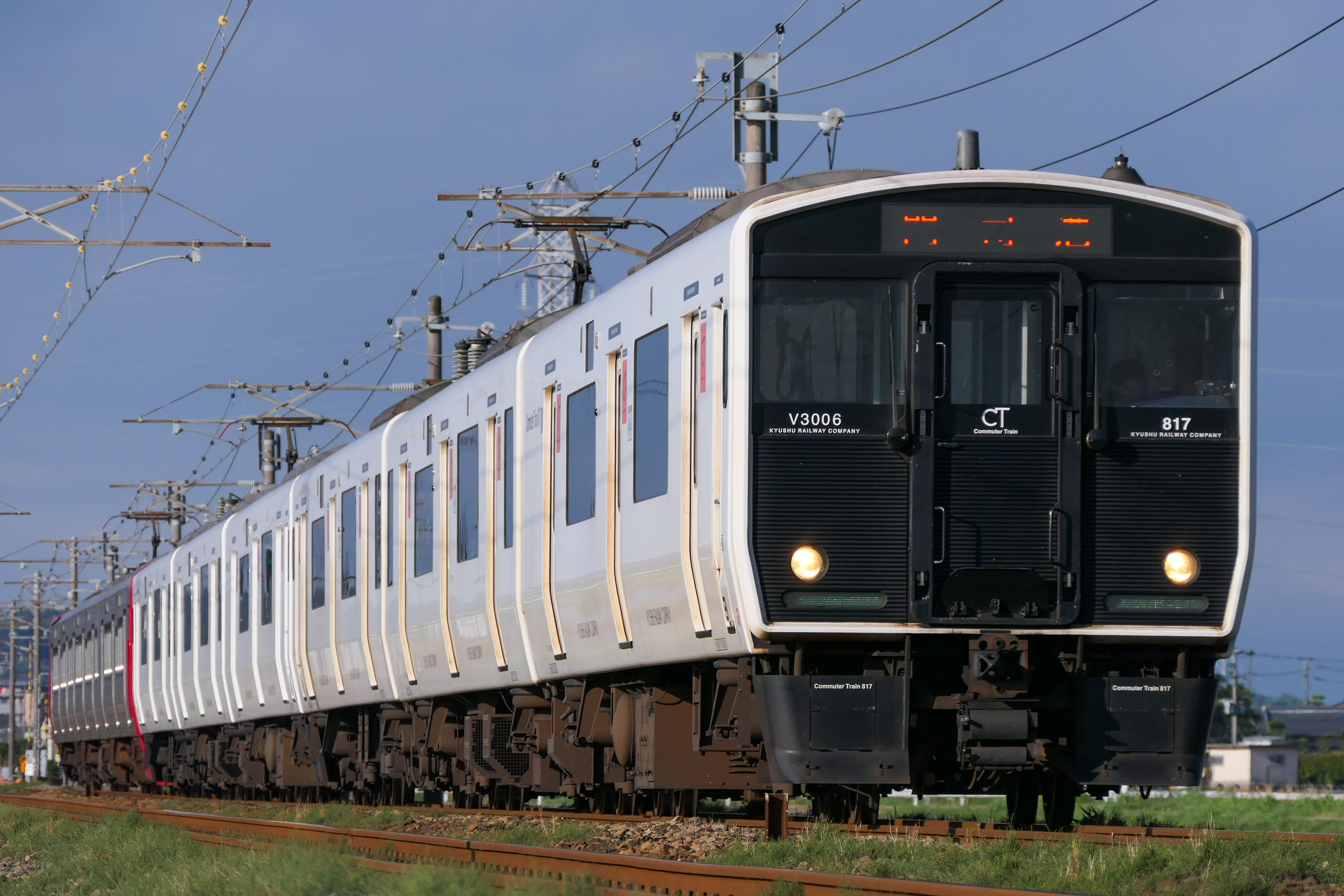
Set V3006 in June 2019

Five fifth-batch 817-3000 series three-car sets (V3001 to V3005) were delivered to Minami-Fukuoka depot from January 2012 for introduction on the Fukuhoku Yutaka Line from the start of the revised timetable on 17 March 2012. As with the 817-2000 series, these sets have white-painted bodysides, and feature longitudinal seating to provide increased overall capacity and relieve overcrowding on the line. These sets feature interior LED lighting. Four more sets, V3006 to V3009, were delivered in February 2013. Two more sets were delivered in March 2015.

=== Formation ===
As of 1 October 2017, the fleet consists of 11 three-car 817-3000 sets (V3001 to V3011), all based at Minami-Fukuoka Depot, and formed as shown below.

Designation	Tc	M	T'c
Numbering	KuHa 817-3000	MoHa 817-3000	KuHa 816-3000
Weight (t)	28.0	34.0	27.8
Capacity total/seated	130/40	152/56	137/48

The MoHa 817 car is fitted with a PS401K single-arm pantograph. The KuHa 817 car has a toilet.

=== Interior ===
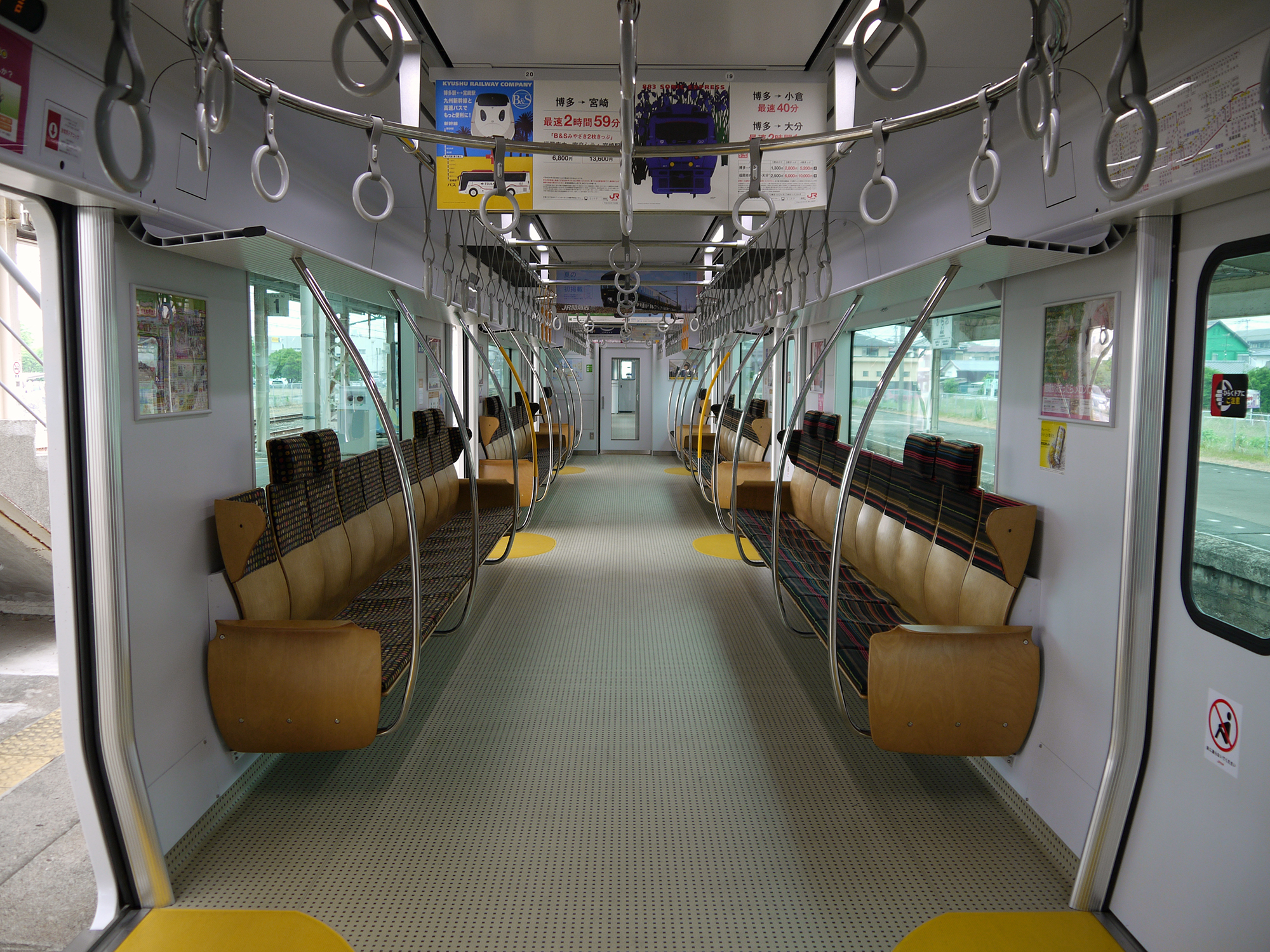
Interior view

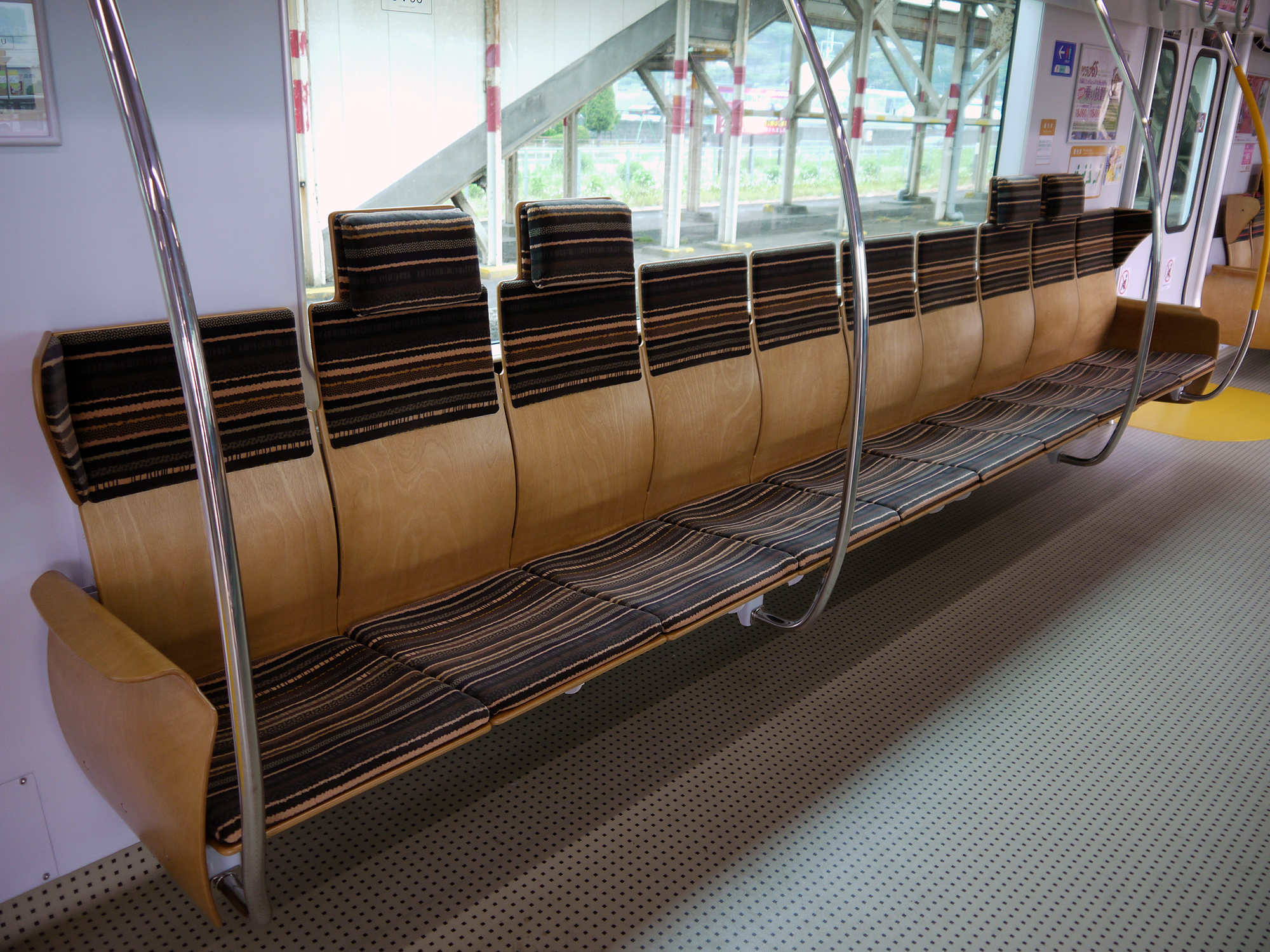
Wooden longitudinal seating

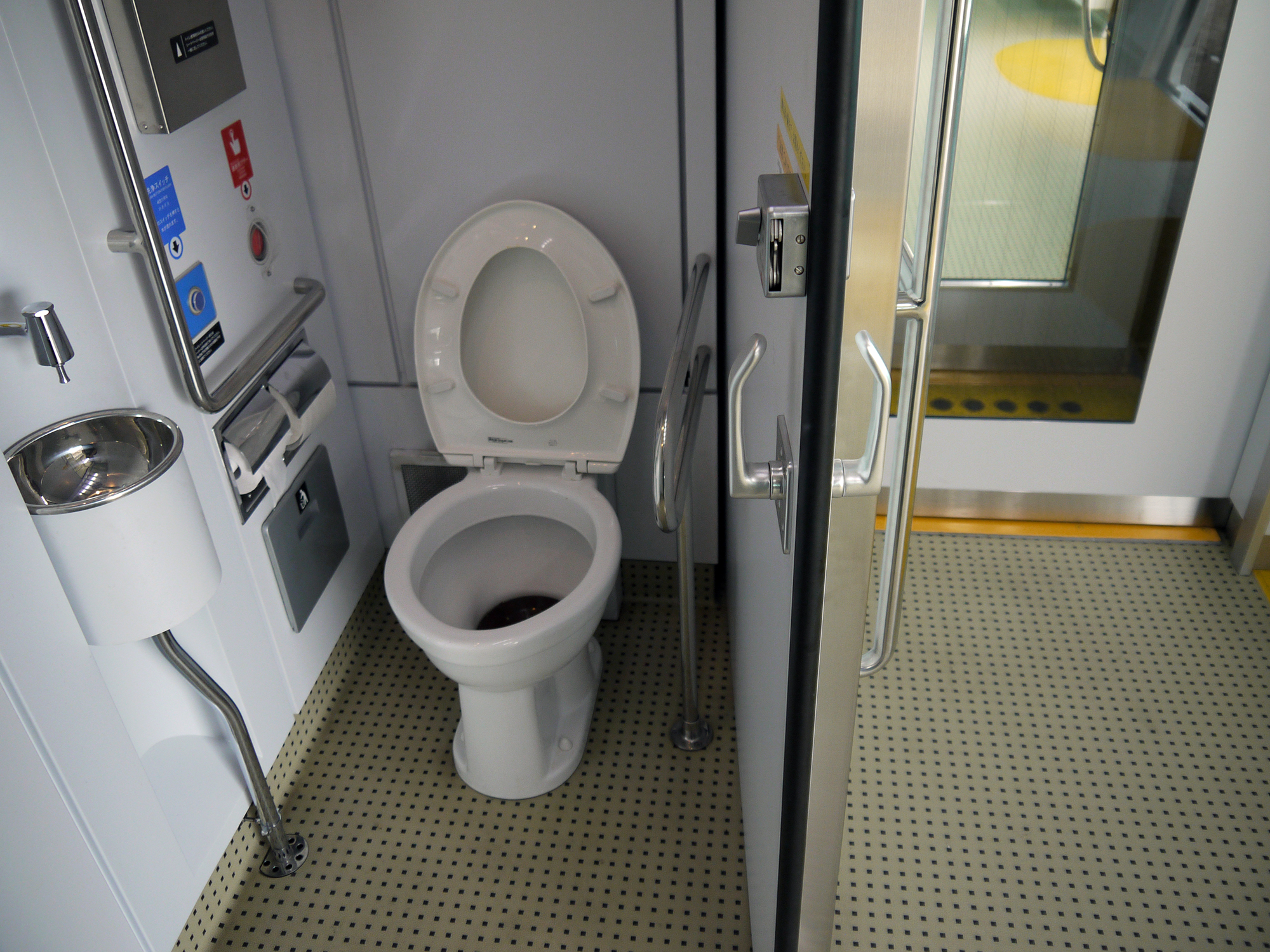
Toilet
