= 717 series =

Japanese train type

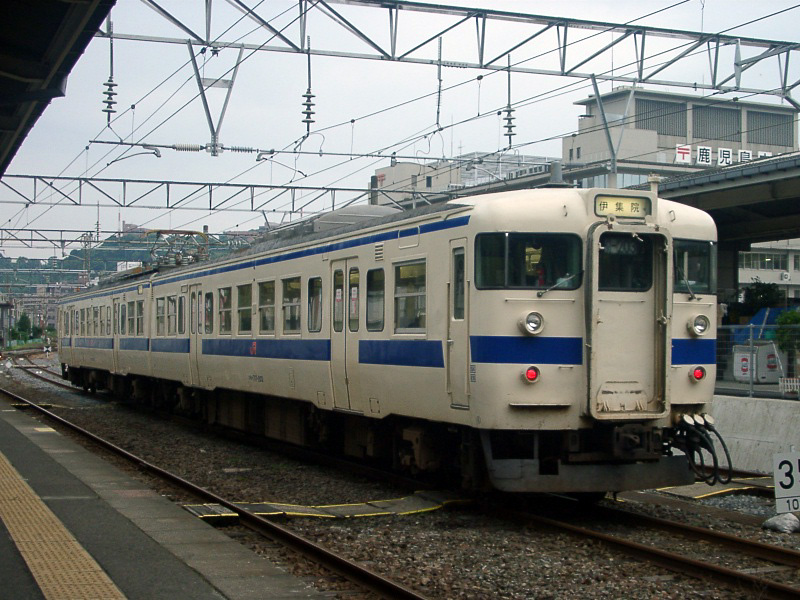
- JR Kyushu 717-200 series set, August 2003
- In service: March 1985–July 2014
- Scrapped: 2006–
- Number built: 46 vehicles (18 sets)
- Number in service: None
- Number preserved: None
- Number scrapped: 46 vehicles (18 sets)
- Successor: 817 series, E721 series
- Formation: 2/3 cars per trainset
- Fleet numbers: HK201–207
- Operators: JNR (1985–1987); JR East (1987–2008); JR Kyushu (1987–2014)
- Depot: Kagoshima

Specifications
- Car body construction: Steel
- Car length: 20,000 mm (65 ft 7 in)
- Width: 2,946 mm (9 ft 8 in)
- Doors: 2 pairs per side
- Maximum speed: 110 km/h (70 mph)
- Traction system: Resistor control
- Electric systems: 20 kV AC 50 Hz (717-0/100 series); 20 kV AC 60 Hz (717-200/900 series)
- Current collection: Overhead catenary
- Coupling system: 451 series, 453 series
- Track gauge: 1,067 mm (3 ft 6 in)

The 717 series (717系) was a Japanese AC electric multiple unit (EMU) train type first introduced by Japanese National Railways (JNR) in March 1985 and later operated on local services by the East Japan Railway Company (JR East) and Kyushu Railway Company (JR Kyushu). The units were formed by converting former AC/DC dual-voltage 451 series, 453 series, 457 series, and 475 series EMUs.

== Variants ==
- 717-0 series: 3-car 20 kV AC 50 Hz sets converted from former 451 series cars for use in the Sendai area
- 717-100 series: 3-car 20 kV AC 50 Hz sets converted from former 451 and 453 series cars for use in the Sendai area
- 717-200 series: 7 x 2-car 20 kV AC 60 Hz sets converted from November 1986 from former 475 series cars for use in Kyushu
- 717-900 series: One 2-car 20 kV AC 60 Hz set converted from former 457 series cars for use in Kyushu

== 717-0 series ==
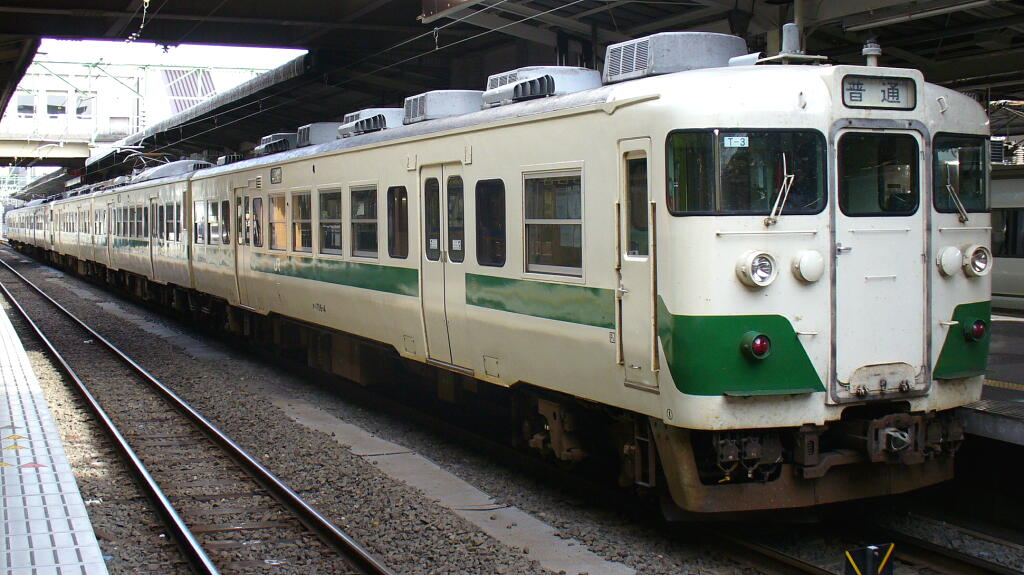
JR East 717-0 series set T3, November 2007

Five 3-car 20 kV AC 50 Hz sets were converted from former 451 series cars with new bodies for use in the Sendai area on Tohoku Main Line and Joban Line local services.

These sets were painted cream ("Cream No. 10") with a green bodyside stripe.

The last remaining set was withdrawn in August 2008.

=== Formations ===
The five 3-car sets, numbered T1 to T5, were formed as follows.

Designation	Mc	M'	Tc'
Numbering	KuMoHa 717	MoHa 716	KuHa 716

The MoHa 716 car was fitted with one lozenge-type pantograph.

=== Interior ===
These sets were made entirely no-smoking from 22 March 1997.

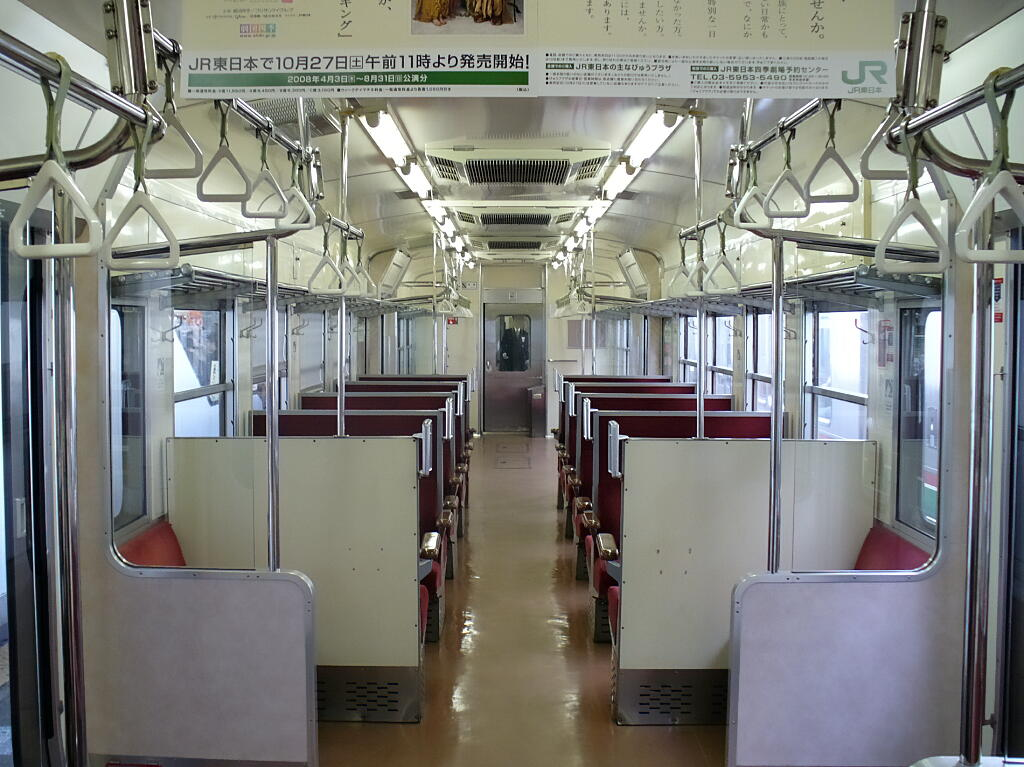
Original interior style, November 2007

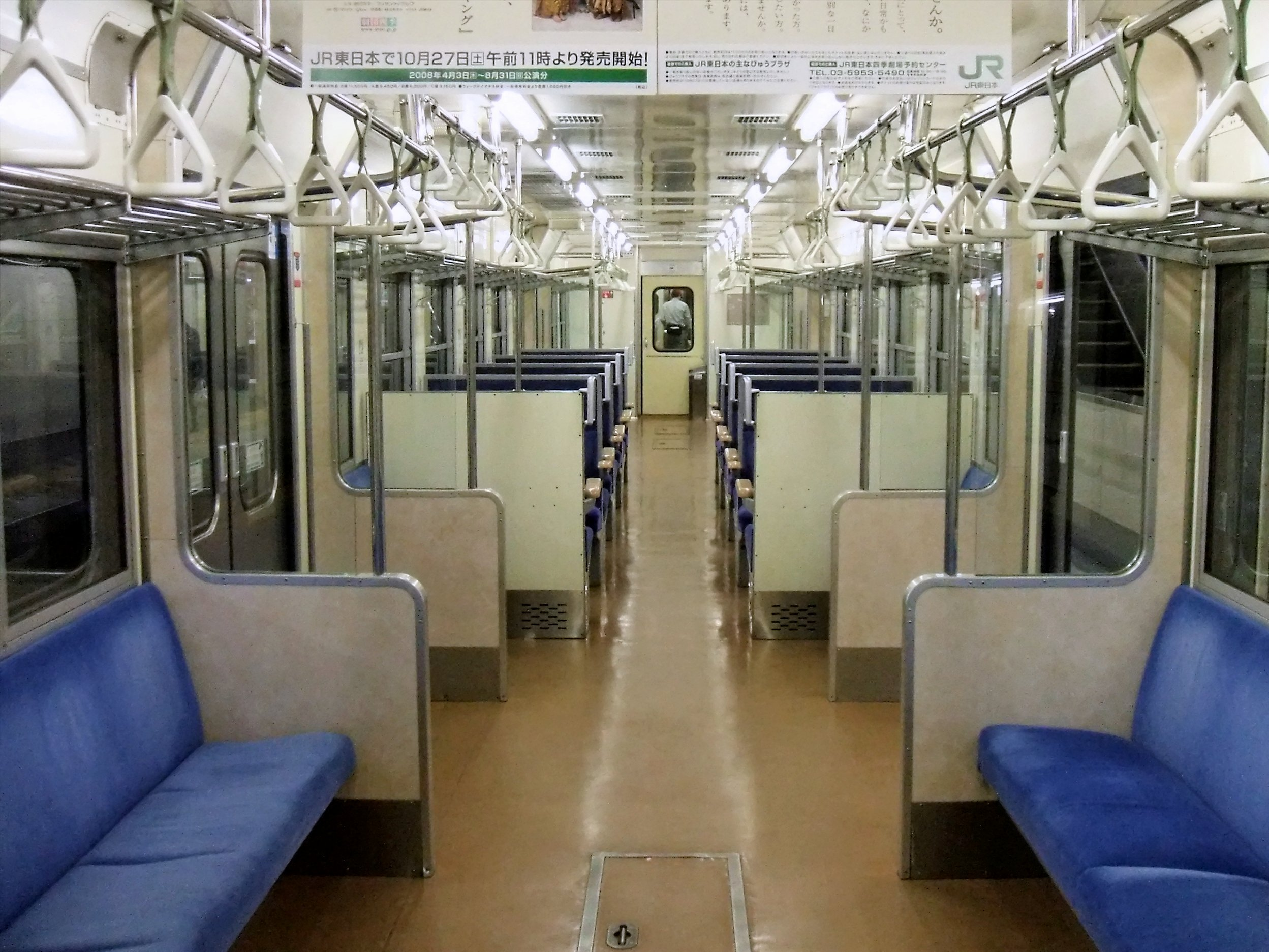
Interior with later seat moquette style, November 2007

=== Withdrawal dates ===
Set number	Date withdrawn
T1	25 February 2008
T2	11 August 2008
T3	14 January 2008
T4	14 January 2008
T5	5 November 2007

== 717-100 series ==
Five 3-car 20 kV AC 50 Hz sets converted from former 451 and 453 series cars with new bodies for use in the Sendai area on Tohoku Main Line and Joban Line local services.

These sets were painted cream ("Cream No. 10") with a green bodyside stripe.

=== Formations ===
The five 3-car sets, numbered T101 to T105, were formed as follows.

Designation	Mc	M'	Tc'
Numbering	KuMoHa 717-100	MoHa 716-100	KuHa 716

The MoHa 716 car was fitted with one lozenge-type pantograph.

These sets were made entirely no-smoking from 22 March 1997.

=== Withdrawal dates ===
Set number	Date withdrawn
T101	14 January 2008
T102	25 February 2008
T103	25 October 2006
T104	5 November 2007
T105	5 November 2007

== 717-200 series ==
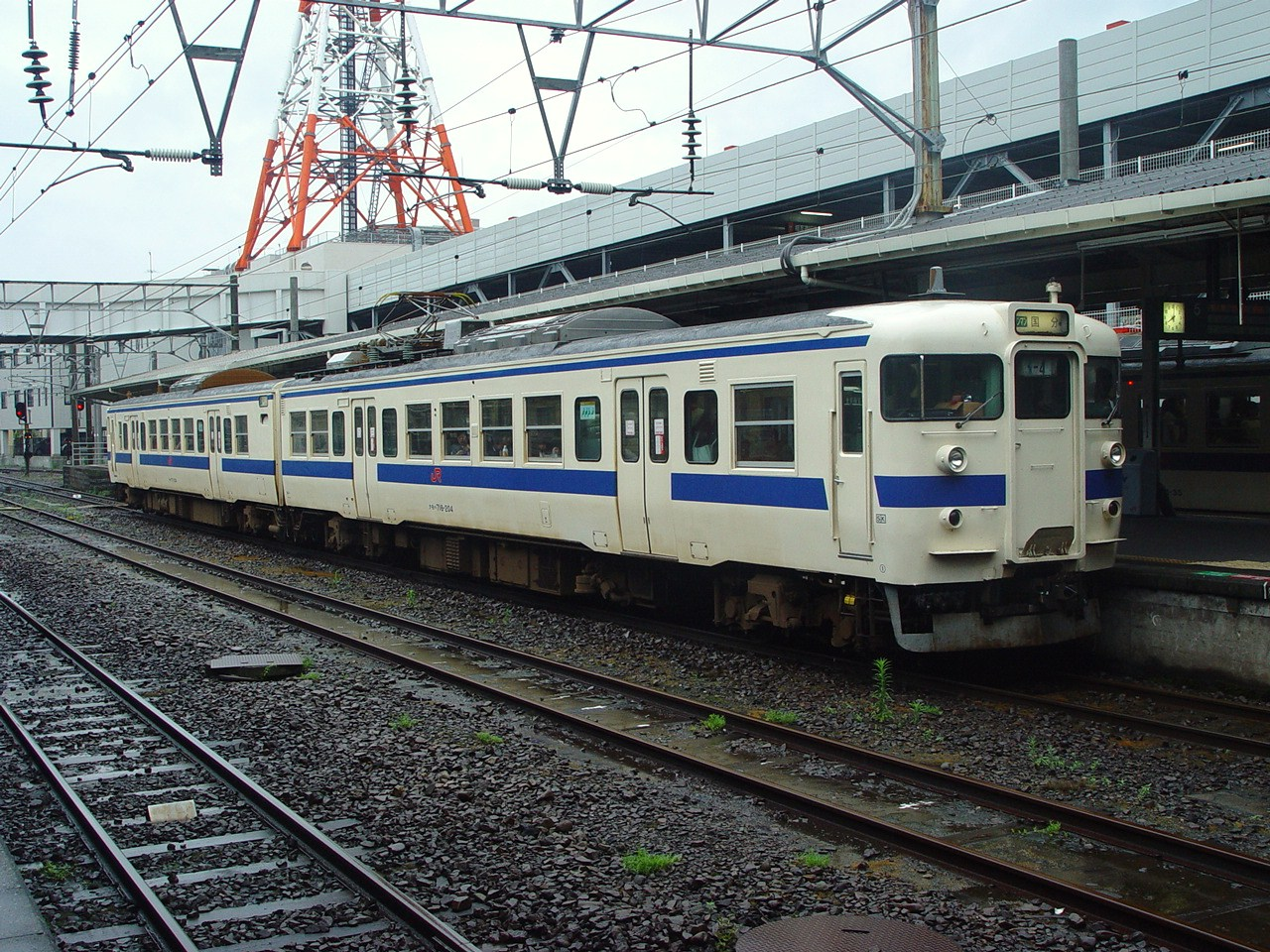
JR Kyushu 717-200 series set HK204, May 2006

7 x 2-car 20 kV AC 60 Hz sets were converted from former 475 series cars with new bodies from November 1986 at JNR's Kokura and Kagoshima factories for use in Kyushu. The body design of these sets was identical to the earlier 713 series, with two pairs of sliding doors on each side. Four sets (HK201 to HK204) were converted in fiscal 1986, and three more sets (HK205 to HK207) were converted in fiscal 1987. The latter batch differed in having no door pocket windows.

These sets were painted white with a blue bodyside stripe.

As of January 2013, only sets HK203 and HK204 are in service, used on early morning and late night services only in the Kagoshima area, with all other sets withdrawn or stored pending withdrawal. Both sets were later withdrawn in 2014 with the increasing number of 817 series cars on the railway.

=== Formations ===
The 2-car sets, numbered HK201 to HK207, are formed as follows.

Designation	Mc	Mc'
Numbering	KuMoHa 717-200	KuMoHa 716-200

The KuMoHa 716-200 car is fitted with one lozenge-type pantograph.

== 717-900 series ==
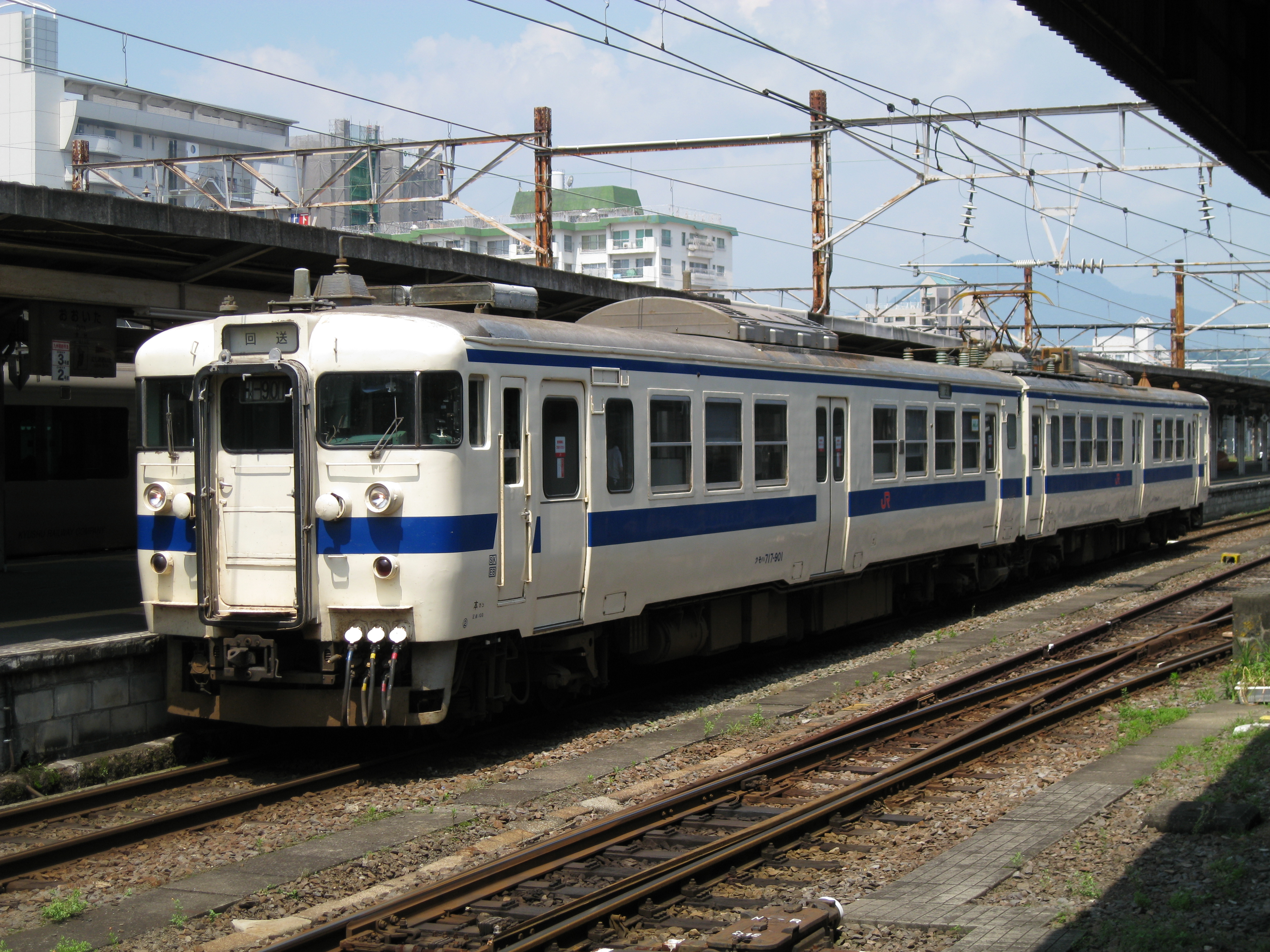
717-900 series set HK901, July 2008

One 2-car 20 kV AC 60 Hz set was converted from former 457 series cars in March 1995 for use in Kyushu, based at Kagoshima Depot. The conversion work involved adding another pair of sliding doors in the centre of each side.

Internally, some of the original transverse seating bays were replaced with longitudinal bench seating.

The sole 717-900 series set was withdrawn in December 2010.

=== Formation ===
The single 2-car set, HK901, was formed as follows.

Designation	Mc	Mc'
Numbering	KuMoHa 717-901	KuMoHa 716-901

KuMoHa 717-901 was converted from KuMoHa 457-14, and KuMoHa 716-901 was converted from former intermediate car MoHa 456-14 with the cab end from 455 series KuHa 455-601.

=== Interior ===
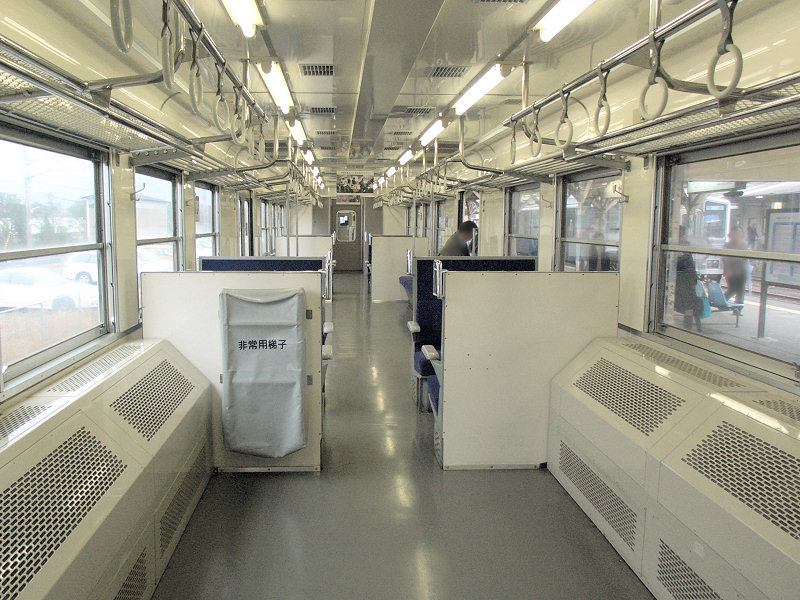
Interior of KuMoHa 717-901, February 2007

== Withdrawal ==
The last two sets were withdrawn in July 2014. No 717 series cars have been preserved.
