= 815 series =

Japanese train type

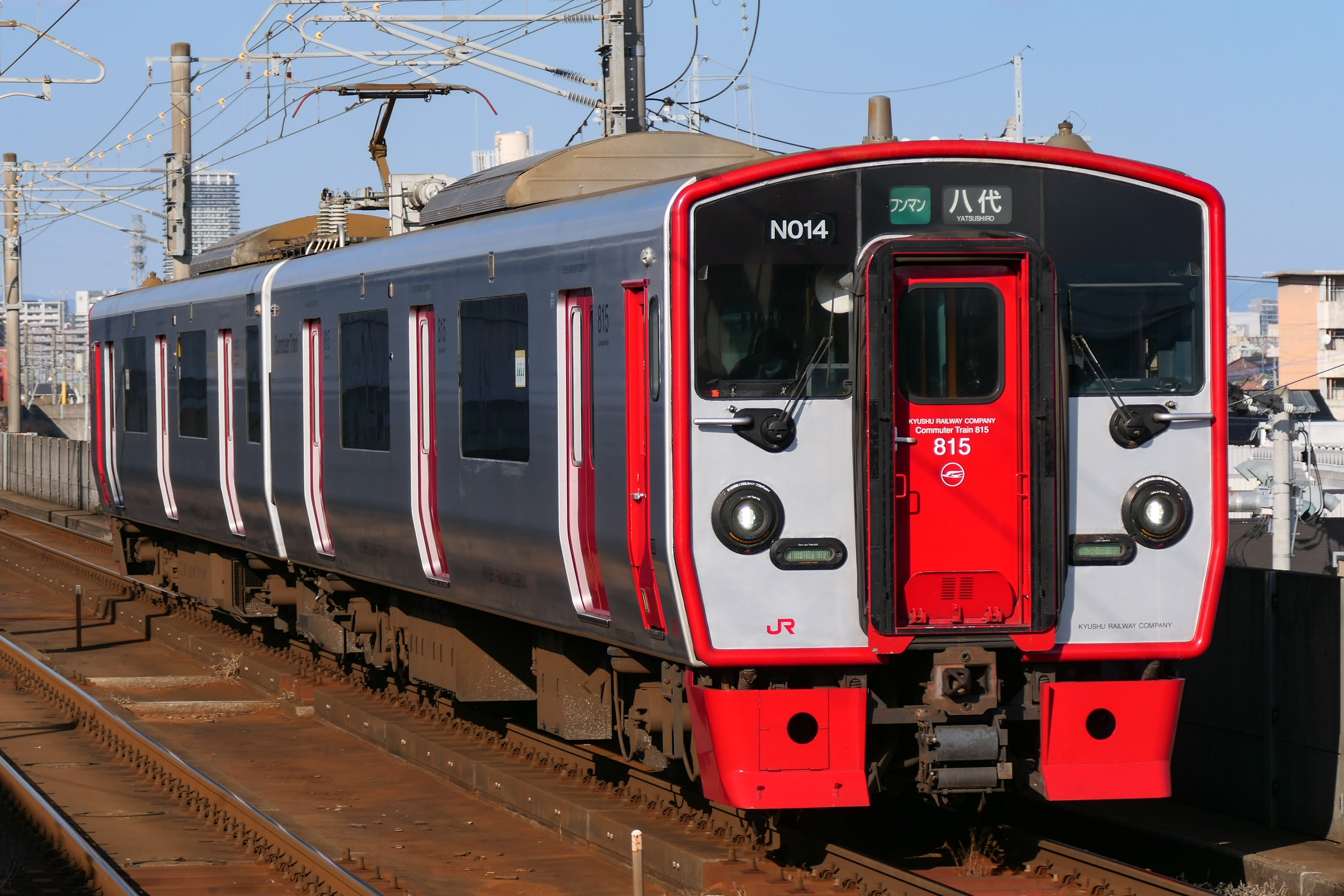
- 815 series, January 2022
- In service: 1 October 1999–present
- Manufacturers: Hitachi, JR Kyushu
- Family name: Hitachi A-train
- Replaced: 423 series, 457 series, 475 series
- Constructed: 1999
- Number built: 52 vehicles (26 sets)
- Number in service: 52 vehicles (26 sets)
- Formation: 2 cars per trainset
- Fleet numbers: N001–N014, N016–N027
- Operator: JR Kyushu
- Depots: Kumamoto, Ōita

Specifications
- Car body construction: Aluminium
- Car length: 20,000 mm (65 ft 7 in)
- Width: 2,950 mm (9 ft 8 in)
- Doors: 3 pairs per side
- Maximum speed: 120 km/h (75 mph)
- Electric system: 20 kV 60 Hz AC (overhead catenary)
- Current collection: Pantograph
- Track gauge: 1,067 mm (3 ft 6 in)

The 815 series (815系, 815-kei) is an AC electric multiple unit (EMU) train type operated on local services by Kyushu Railway Company (JR Kyushu) in Japan since 1999.

== Design ==
The 815 series was the first aluminium-alloy EMU to be ordered by JR Kyushu, and was designed to be lighter than the earlier 813 series design. The trains were introduced on wanman driver only operation services, replacing ageing 423, 457, and 475 series rolling stock.

== History ==
A total of 26 2-car sets (52 cars) were delivered to Kumamoto and Ōita depots between May and October 1999.

Kumamoto set N015 was renumbered N027 in February 2000.

== Formation ==
Numbering	KuMoHa 815	KuHa 814

The KuMoHa 815 car is fitted with a PS401K single-arm pantograph.

== Interior ==
Seating is longitudinal throughout. The KuMoHa 815 car has a toilet, and the KuHa 814 car is fitted with a wheelchair space.

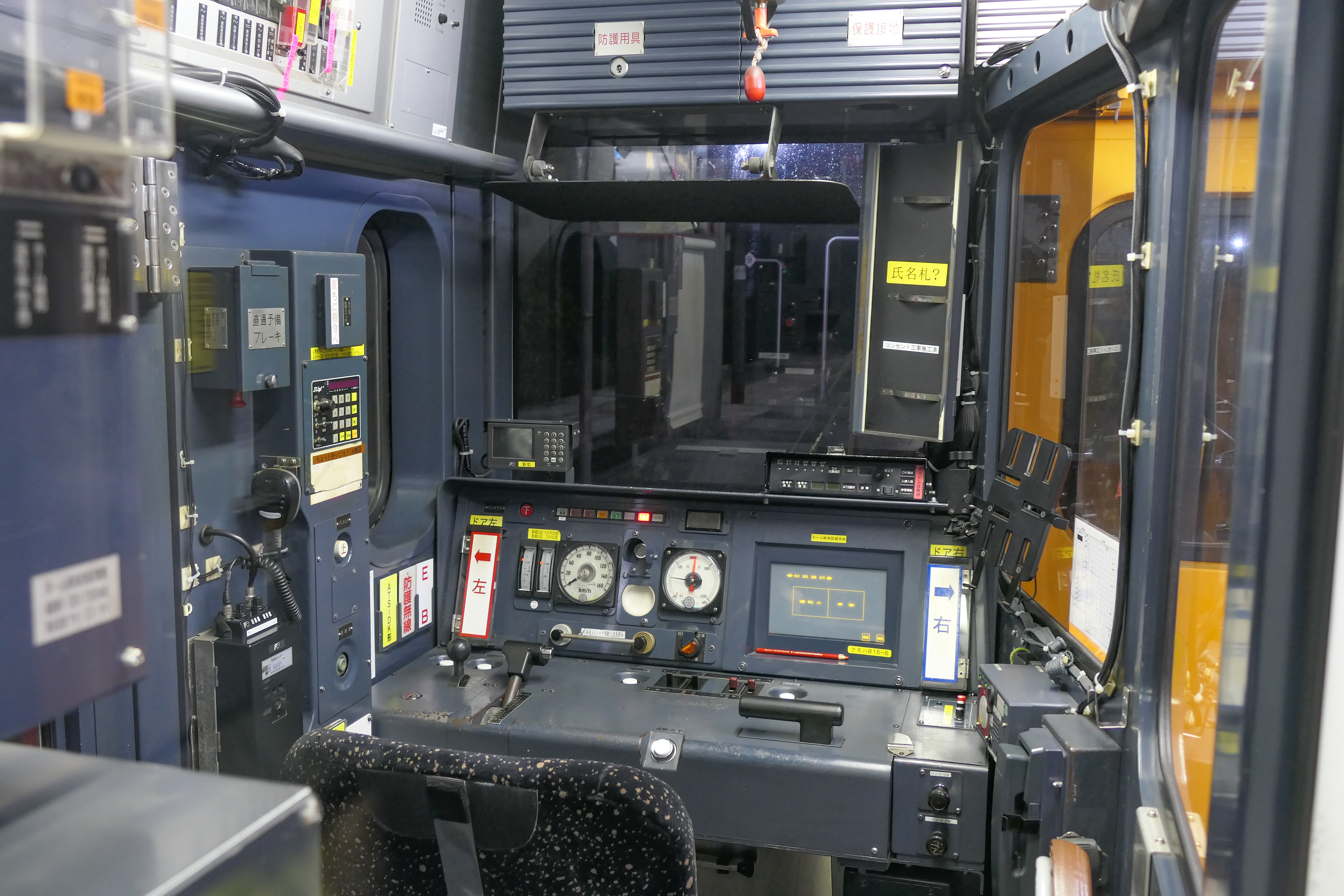
Driving seat

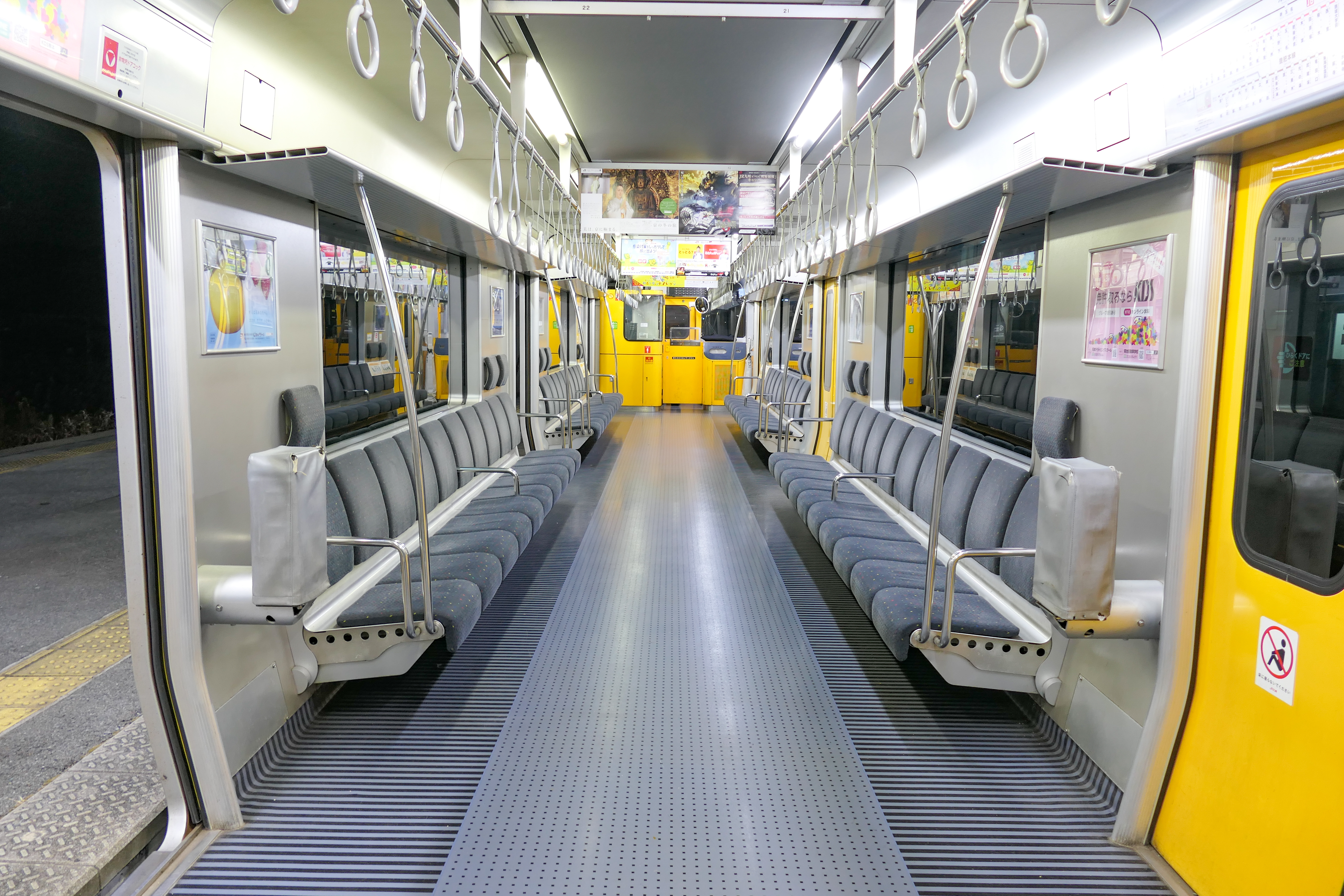
Interior view

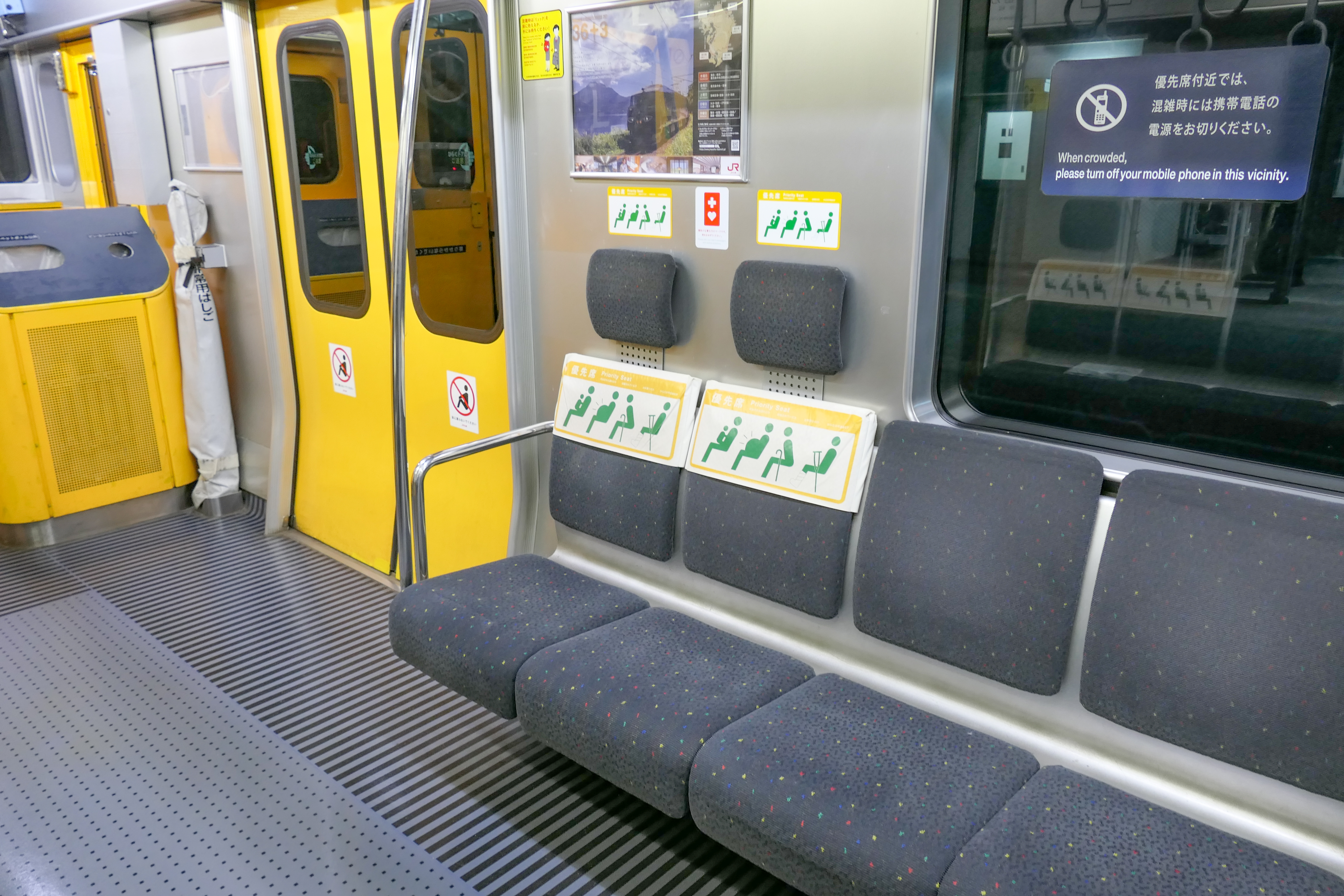
Priority seating

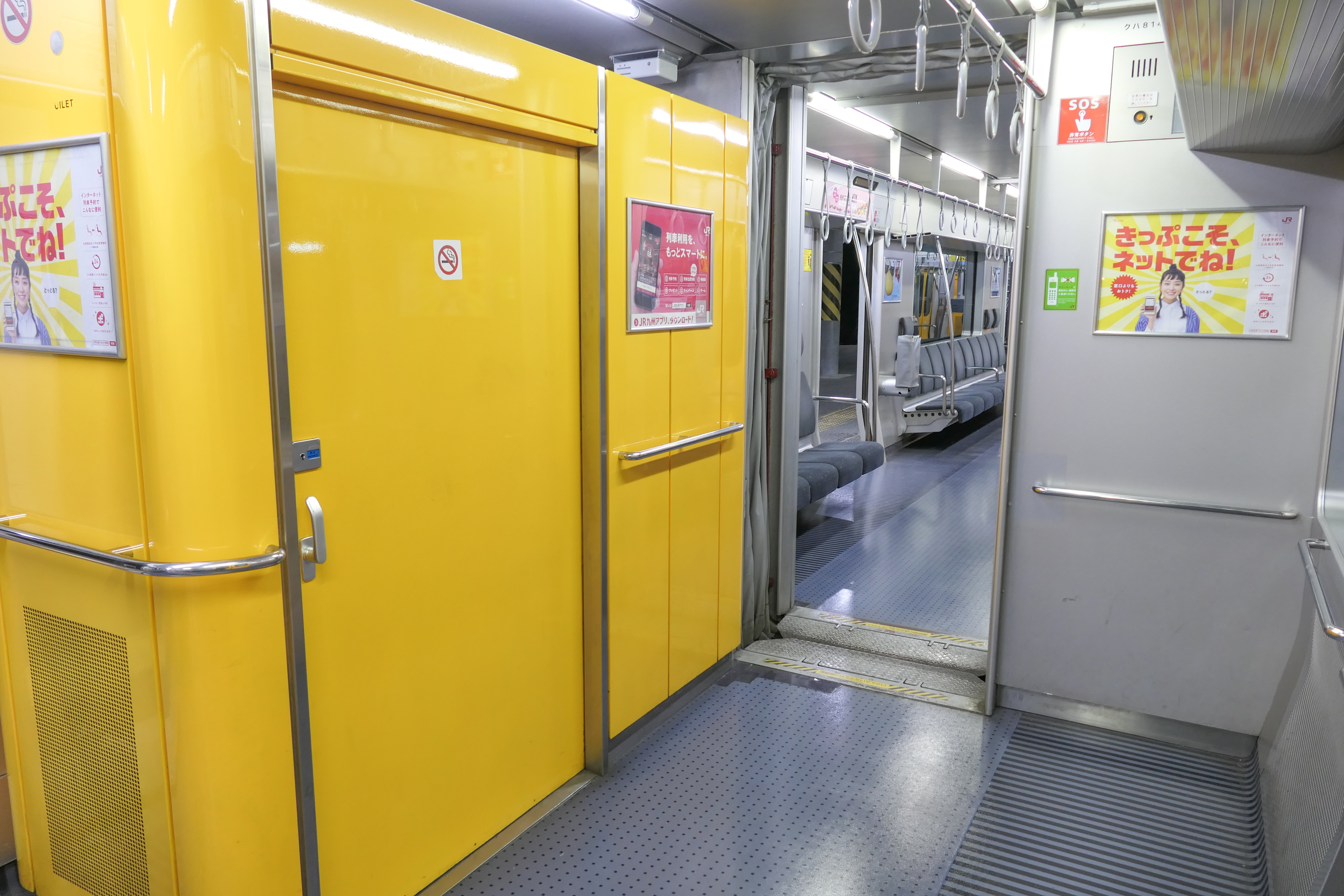
Toilet

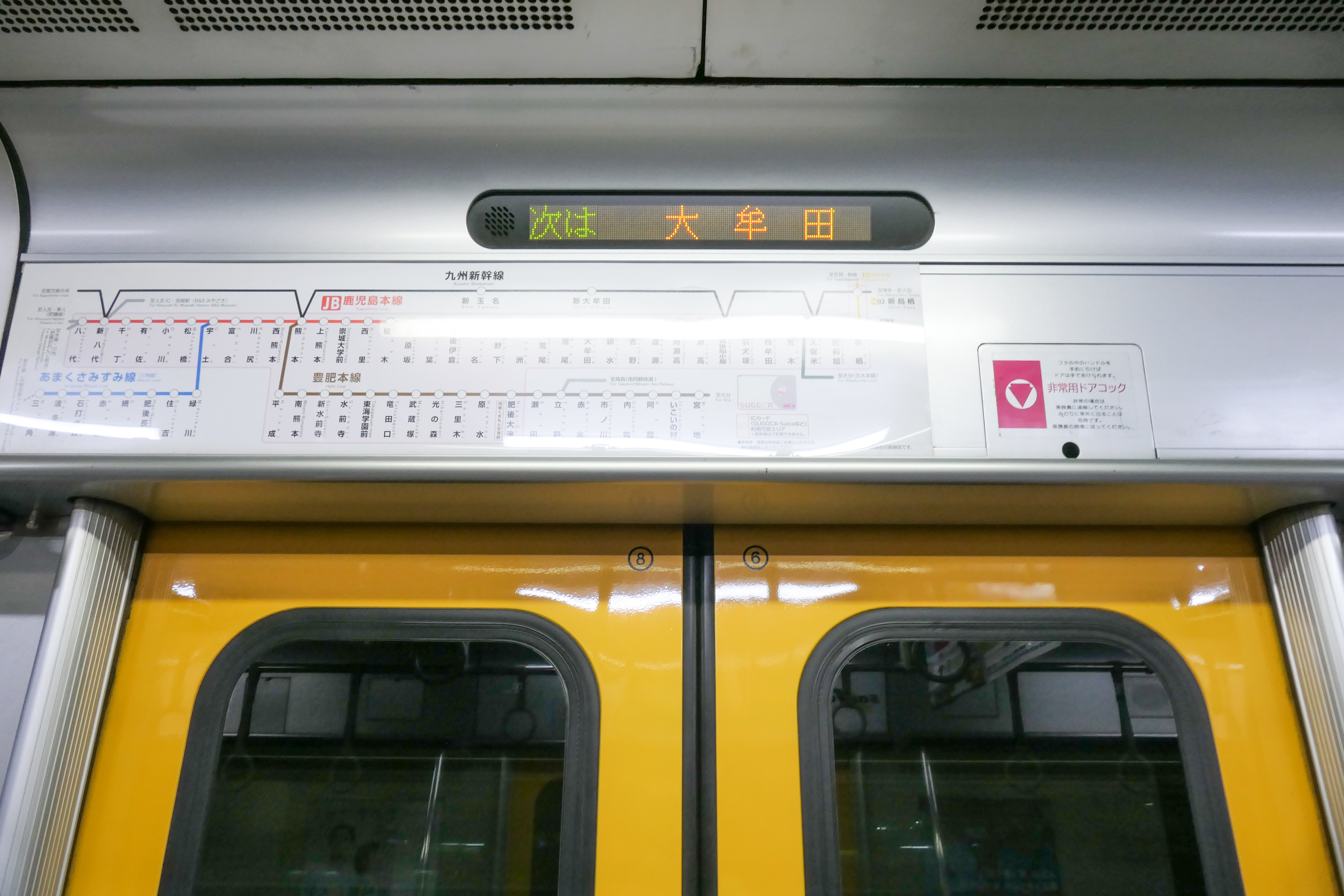
LED display
