= Attack angle (rail technology) =

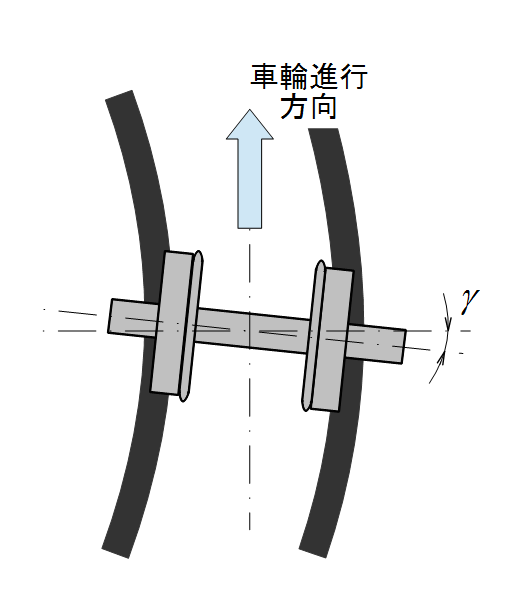
Attack angle, represented by γ

In rail transport, attack angle refers to an angle between the direction of the wheelset and the direction of the curved section of rail on which it travels.

== Overview ==
If the attack angle is not perfectly parallel, a force that pushes the wheels laterally against the outer rail is generated, which contributes to a risk of derailment. An increase in attack angle also results in wheels slipping against rails, increasing wear on both components; a sufficiently high attack angle may bring the flanges of the wheels into contact with the side of the rail, causing a squeaking noise in addition to increasing wear.

A lubrication device may be installed trackside or on the vehicle for the purpose of reducing wear in curved sections caused by attack angles. Earlier axle designs such as the Arnoux and Cleminson systems allowed wheelsets to pivot individually. Various radial steering bogies, such as the Scheffel bogie, apply this principle to bogies for the purpose of reducing attack angle.

== See also ==
- KiHa 283 series, 383 series, Tokyo Metro 1000 series, and Tokyo Metro 2000 series, equipped with radial steering bogies
- GE AC4400CW, a locomotive optionally equipped with radial steering bogies
- Talgo, a manufacturer of trains with axles shared between cars
- Nadal formula
