= Tokyo Metro 02 series =

Japanese train type

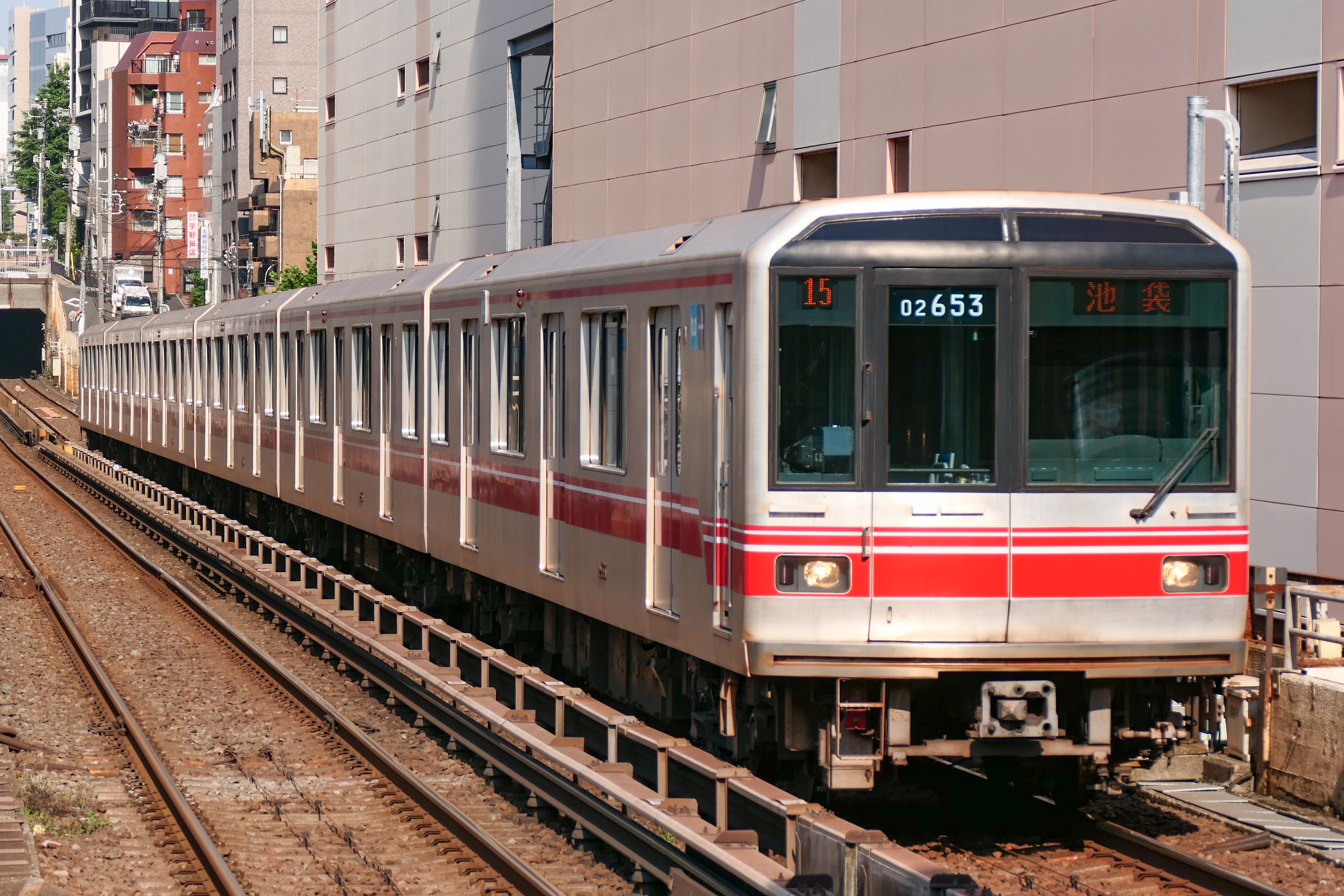
- Marunouchi Line 02 series train near Korakuen Station in July 2022
- In service: 1988–2024
- Manufacturers: Kawasaki Heavy Industries; Kinki Sharyo; Nippon Sharyo; Tokyu Car Corporation
- Replaced: TRTA 300/400/500/900 series
- Constructed: 1988–1996
- Entered service: 17 October 1988
- Refurbished: 2010–2017
- Scrapped: 2018–
- Number built: 336 vehicles; 53 × 6-car; 6 × 3-car
- Number in service: None
- Number preserved: 2 vehicles
- Successor: Tokyo Metro 2000 series
- Formation: 6 cars per Marunouchi Line trainset; 3 cars per Branch Line trainset
- Fleet numbers: 01–53 (6-car sets); 81–86 (3-car sets)
- Capacity: 124 (42 seating) (end cars), 135/136 (50/52 seating) (intermediate cars)
- Operators: Tokyo Metro, previously TRTA
- Depots: Koishikawa, Nakano
- Line served: Marunouchi Line

Specifications
- Car body construction: Aluminium
- Car length: 18,000 mm (59 ft 1 in)
- Width: 2,830 mm (9 ft 3 in)
- Height: 3,495 mm (11 ft 5.6 in)
- Doors: 3 per car
- Maximum speed: 75 km/h (47 mph)
- Traction system: 1st-5th batch: Chopper control (as built); 5th-8th batch: IGBT-VVVF
- Power output: 120 kW (160 hp) per motor
- Transmission: Westinghouse-Natal (WN) drive; Gear ratio: 6.73 : 1
- Acceleration: 3.0 km/(h⋅s) (1.9 mph/s) (1st–5th batch); 3.2 km/(h⋅s) (2.0 mph/s) (5th–8th batch)
- Deceleration: 4.0 km/(h⋅s) (2.5 mph/s); 5.0 km/(h⋅s) (3.1 mph/s) (emergency)
- Electric systems: 600 V DC third rail
- Current collection: Contact shoe
- Bogies: FS-520A, FS-020A (sets 01-19); SS-130, SS-030 (sets 20-53, 81-86)
- Safety systems: CS-ATC (ATO), TASC; Train stop (Obsolete)
- Coupling system: Tomlinson
- Track gauge: 1,435 mm (4 ft 8 1/2 in)

The Tokyo Metro 02 series (東京メトロ02系, Tōkyō Metoro 02-kei) was an electric multiple unit (EMU) train type operated by Tokyo Metro on the Tokyo Metro Marunouchi Line subway in Tokyo, Japan, from 1988 until 2024. Its design is based on the Tokyo Metro 01 series.

== Operations ==
A total of 336 cars were introduced into service from 17 October 1988 in 8 batches. 53 six-car train sets (batches 1 to 7) operate on the main section of the Marunouchi Line, while the Hōnanchō branch uses six three-car train sets (batch 8).

== Formations ==
=== 6-car sets ===
The 53 six-car sets (01–53) are formed as shown below, with car 6 at the Ikebukuro end.

Car No.	1	2	3	4	5	6
Designation	CT1	M	T	M'	M	CT2
Numbering	02-100	02-200	02-300	02-400	02-500	02-600

=== 3-car sets ===
The 6 three-car Hōnanchō branch line sets (81–86) are formed as shown below, with car 3 at the Nakano-Sakaue end.

Car No.	1	2	3
Designation	CM	M1	CT'
Numbering	02-180	02-280	02-380

== Interior ==
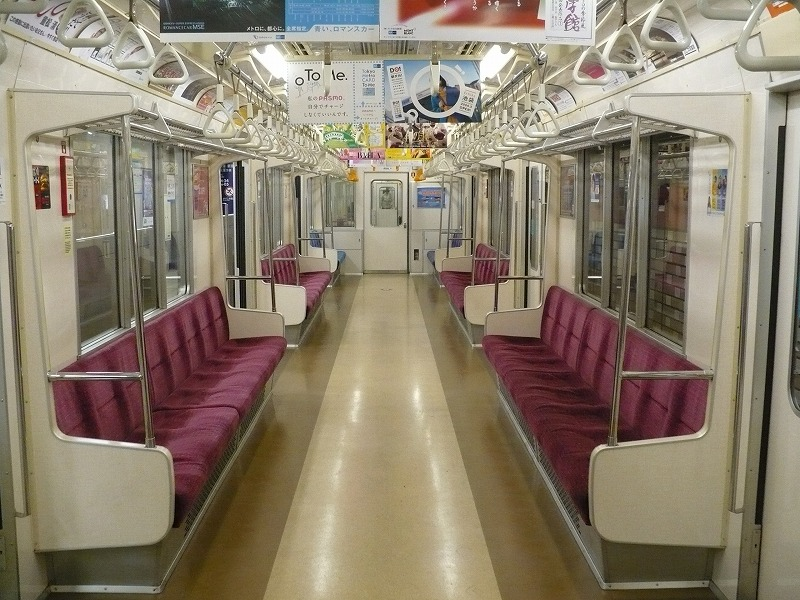
Interior (non-refurbished)

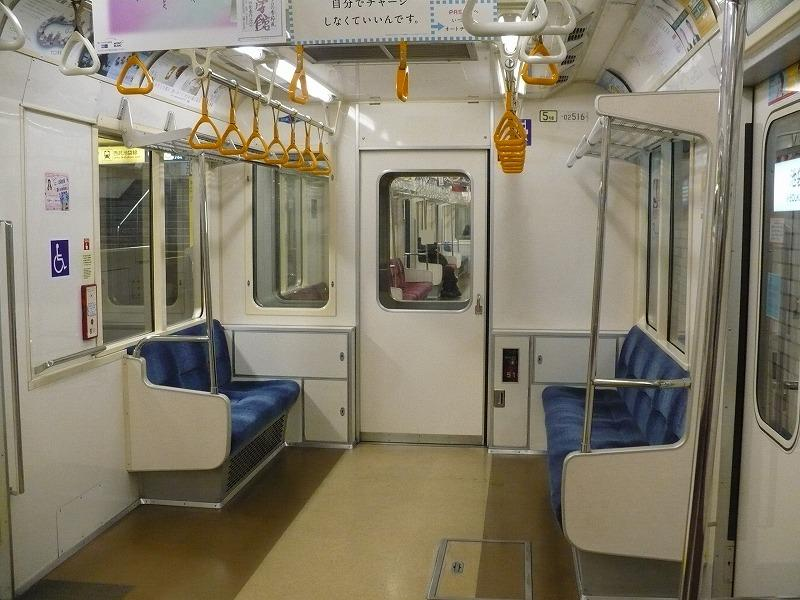
Priority seating (non-refurbished)

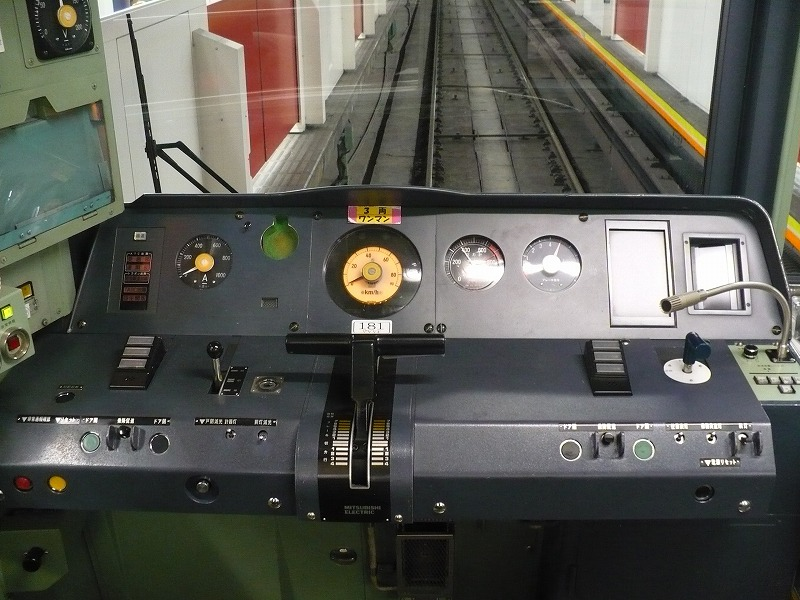
Driver's cab

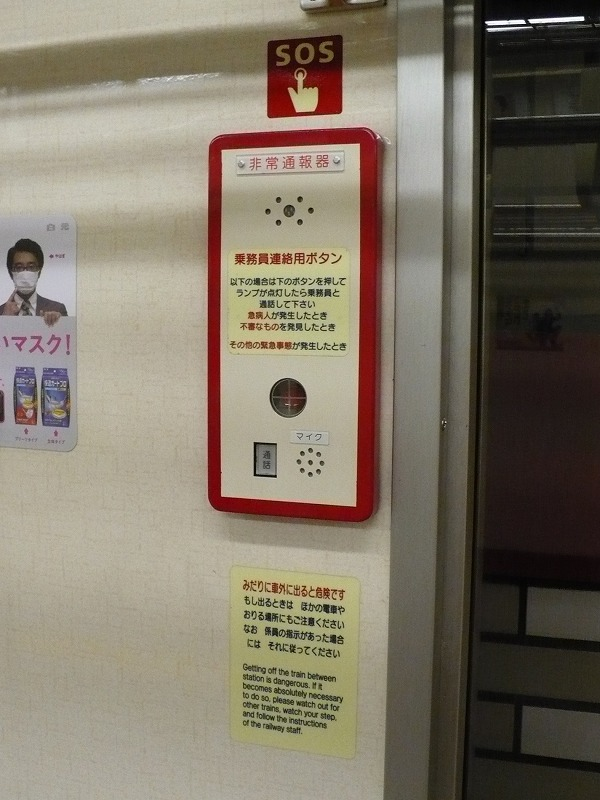
An emergency intercom beside the doors

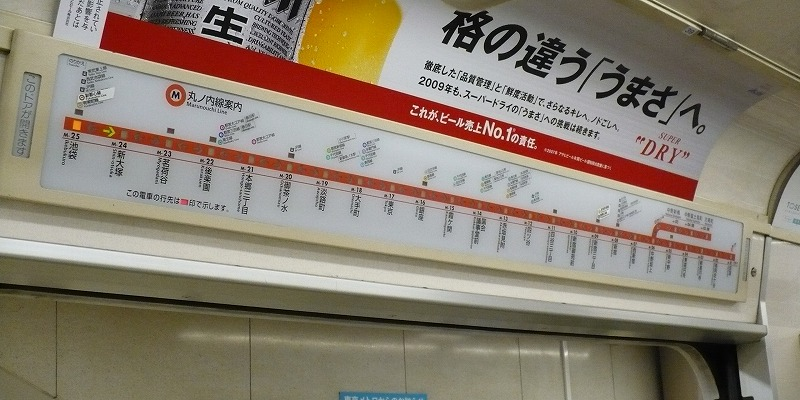
Destination indicator above passenger door

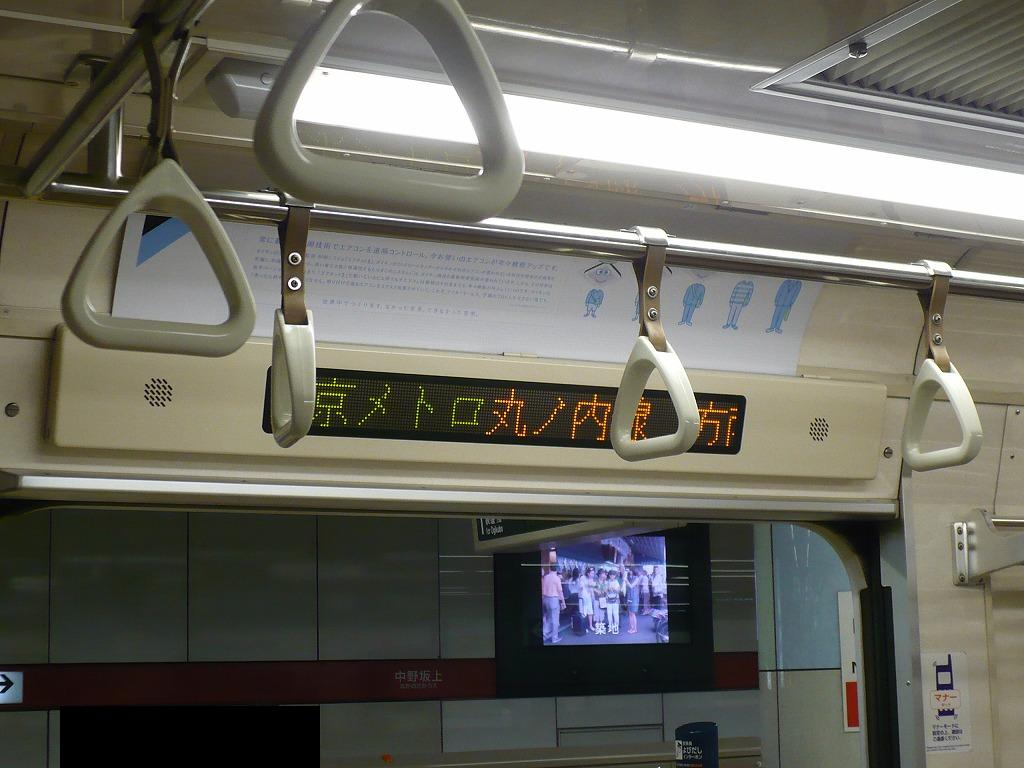
LED screen above passenger door

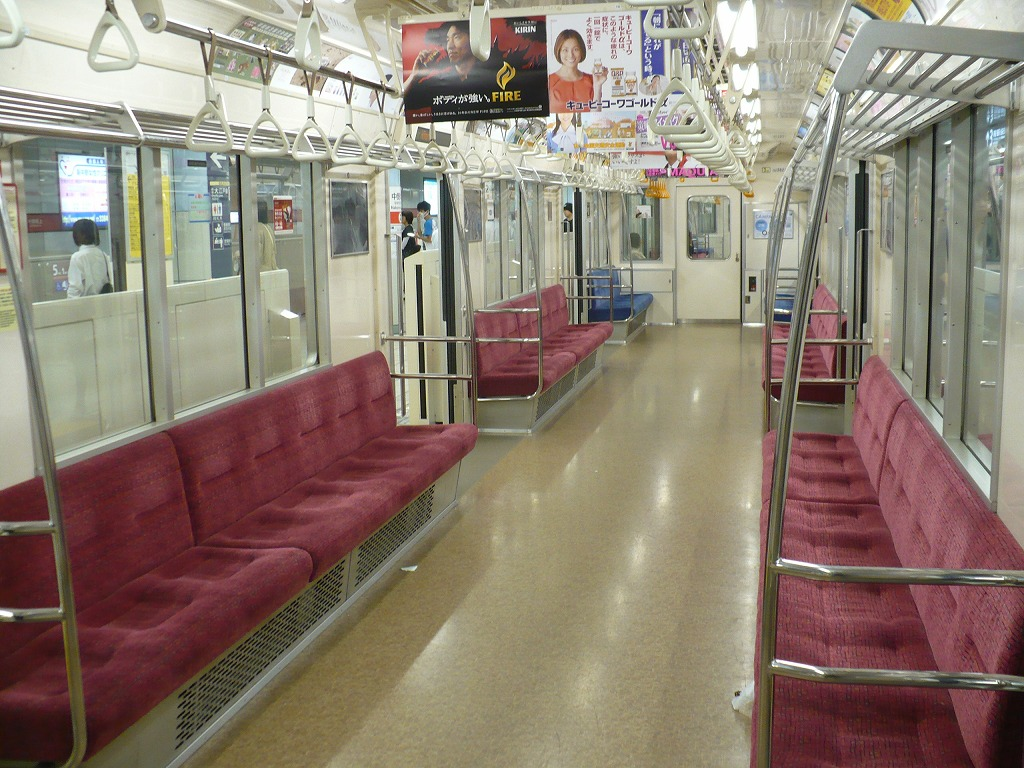
Interior for Hōnanchō Branch Line 3-car sets

All refurbished trains have a pink interior and some LCD passenger information screens above all doors.

== History ==
The first trains entered service from 17 October 1988.

In March 1998, Automatic Train Control was introduced on the 02 series, which was supplemented with a Train Automatic Stopping Controller (TASC) system allowing them to stop automatically at stations since November 2002.

=== Hōnanchō branch sets ===
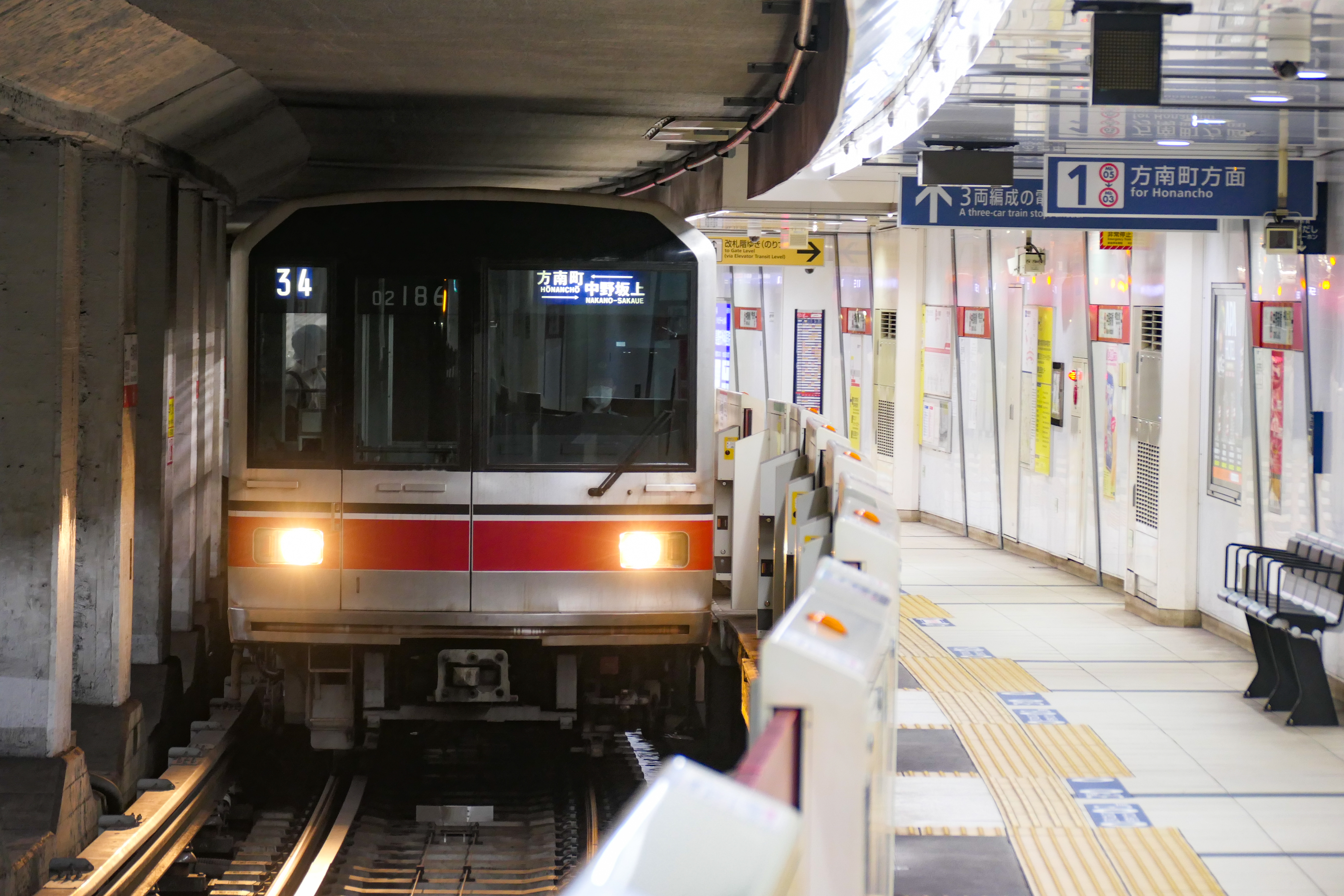
Hōnanchō branch set 86 in August 2022

In 1996, six 3-car 02 series sets were introduced for use on the Hōnanchō branch line. These sets feature an altered livery with a black stripe atop the waistline band. Internally, LED passenger information displays are used, and the longitudinal seats use piped side partitions. After Hōnanchō Station was upgraded in 2019 to accommodate 6-car trains, two of these sets were scrapped in 2021.

In July 2022, Tokyo Metro announced that 3-car trains would be withdrawn from the Hōnanchō branch line from 27 August of that year.

=== Refurbishment ===
The 02 series fleet went under major refurbishment, with the first treated trains returning to service from February 2010. Refurbishment included the use of new Toshiba PMSM (permanent magnet synchronous motors), as fitted to the new Chiyoda Line 16000 series trains, offering energy savings of approximately 10%. Internally, pairs of 17-inch LCD passenger information monitors were installed above the passenger doors. The interior was finished in a pale salmon pink colour reminiscent of the original 300 series trains used on the line, and externally, a white "sine wave" design was added to the red bodyside stripes, again reminiscent of the 300 series livery.

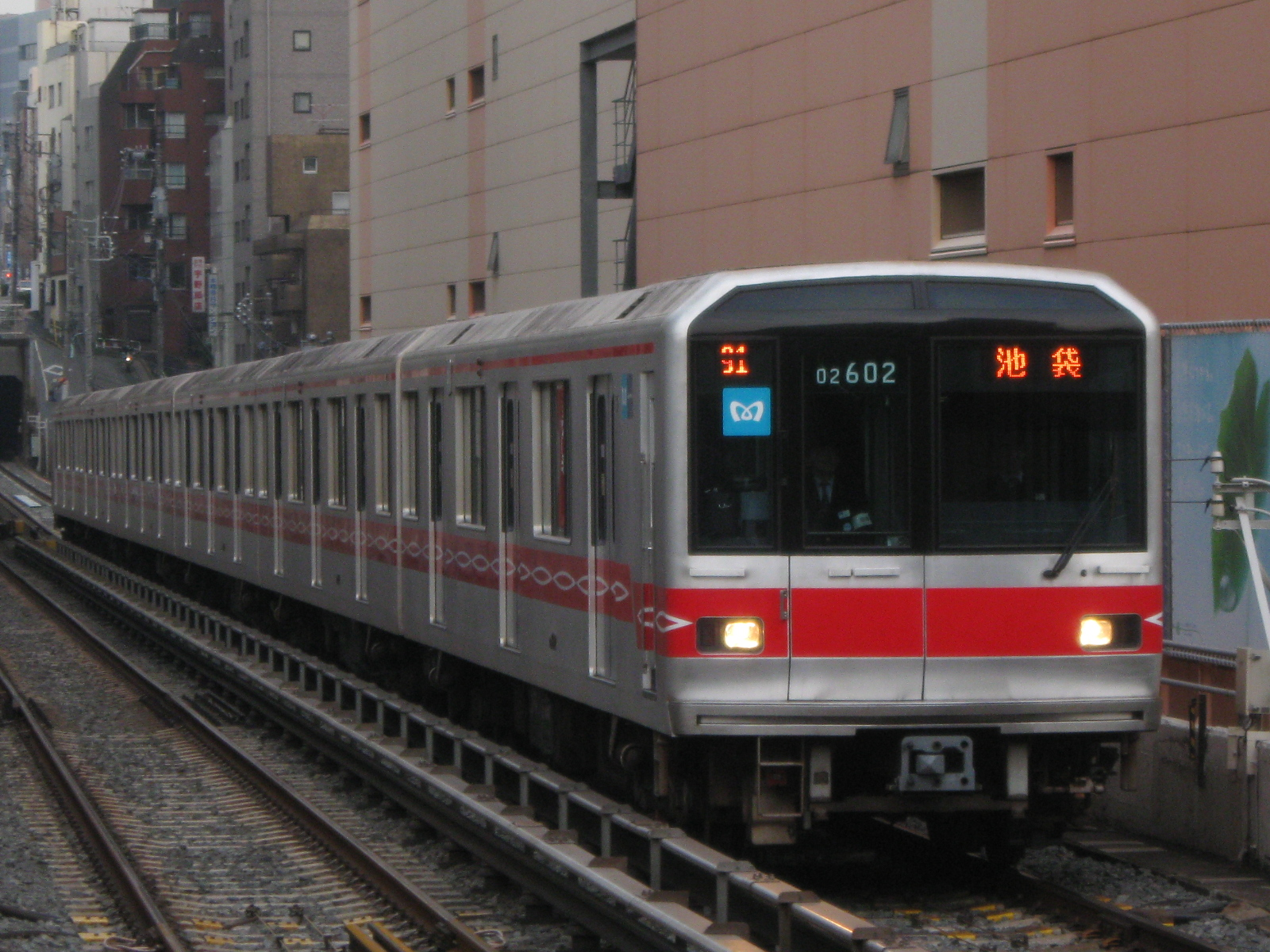
The first set to be treated, set 02-102, near Korakuen Station in March 2010

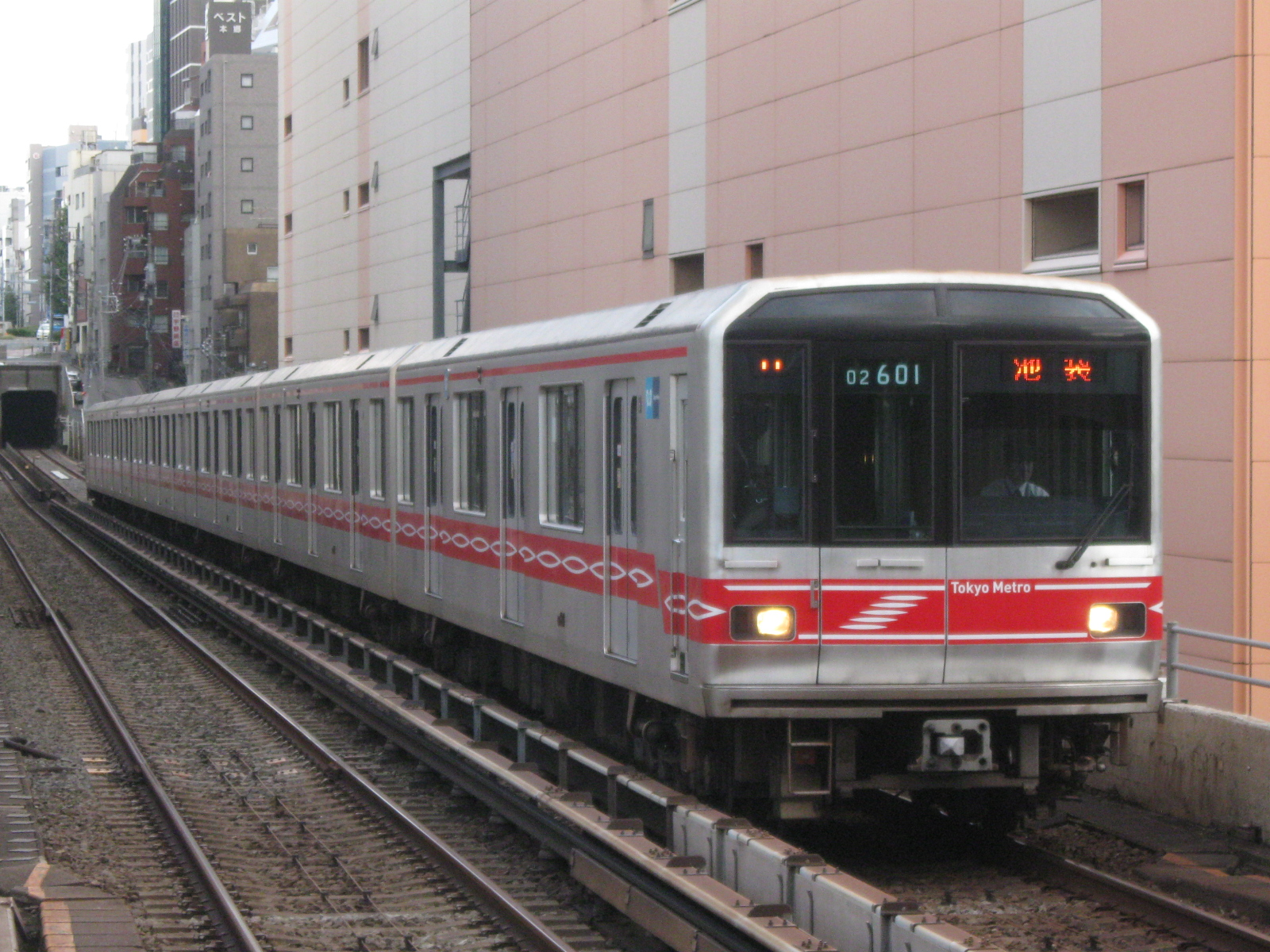
02 series after B-Refurbishment with Tokyo Metro decals at front

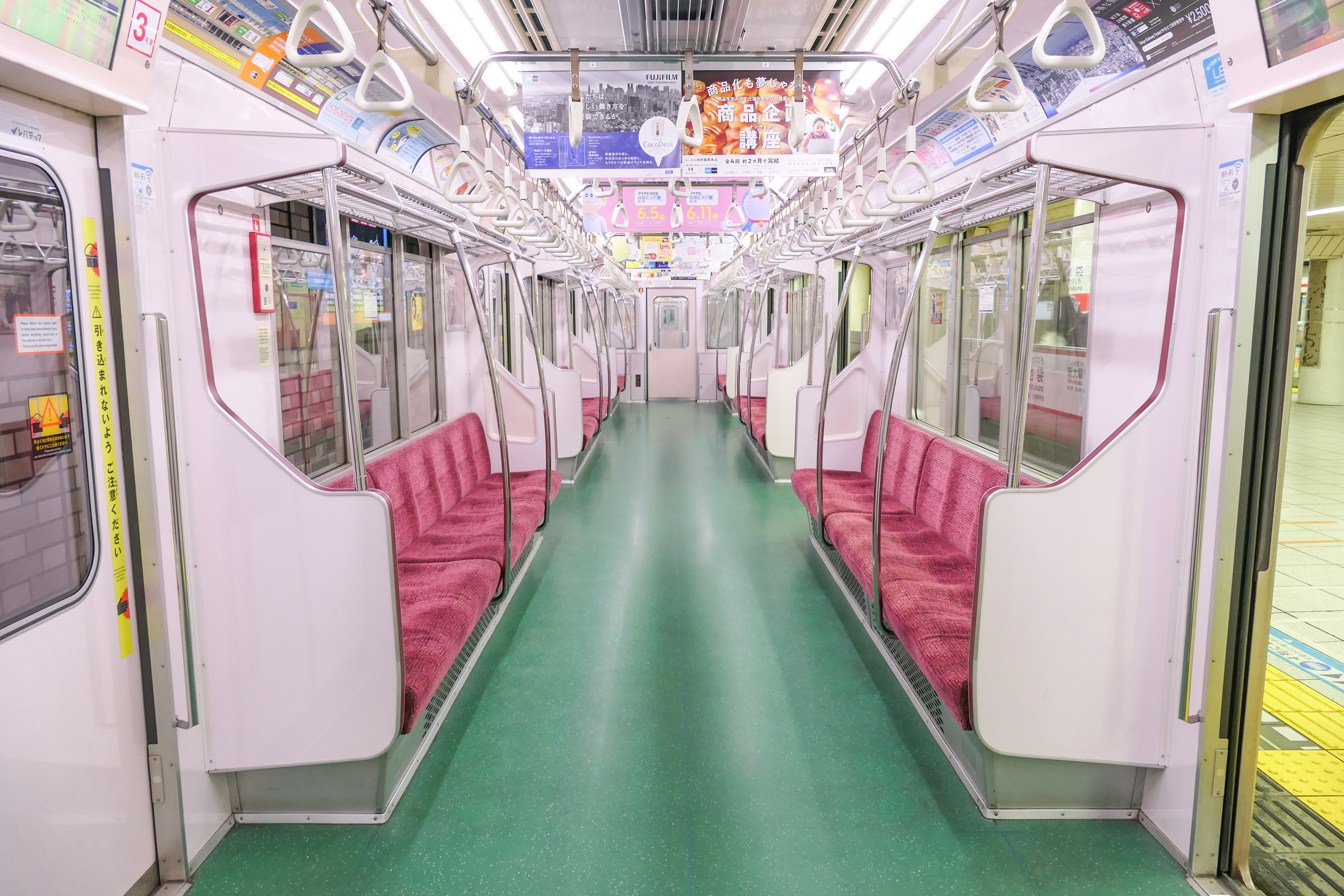
Refurbished interior

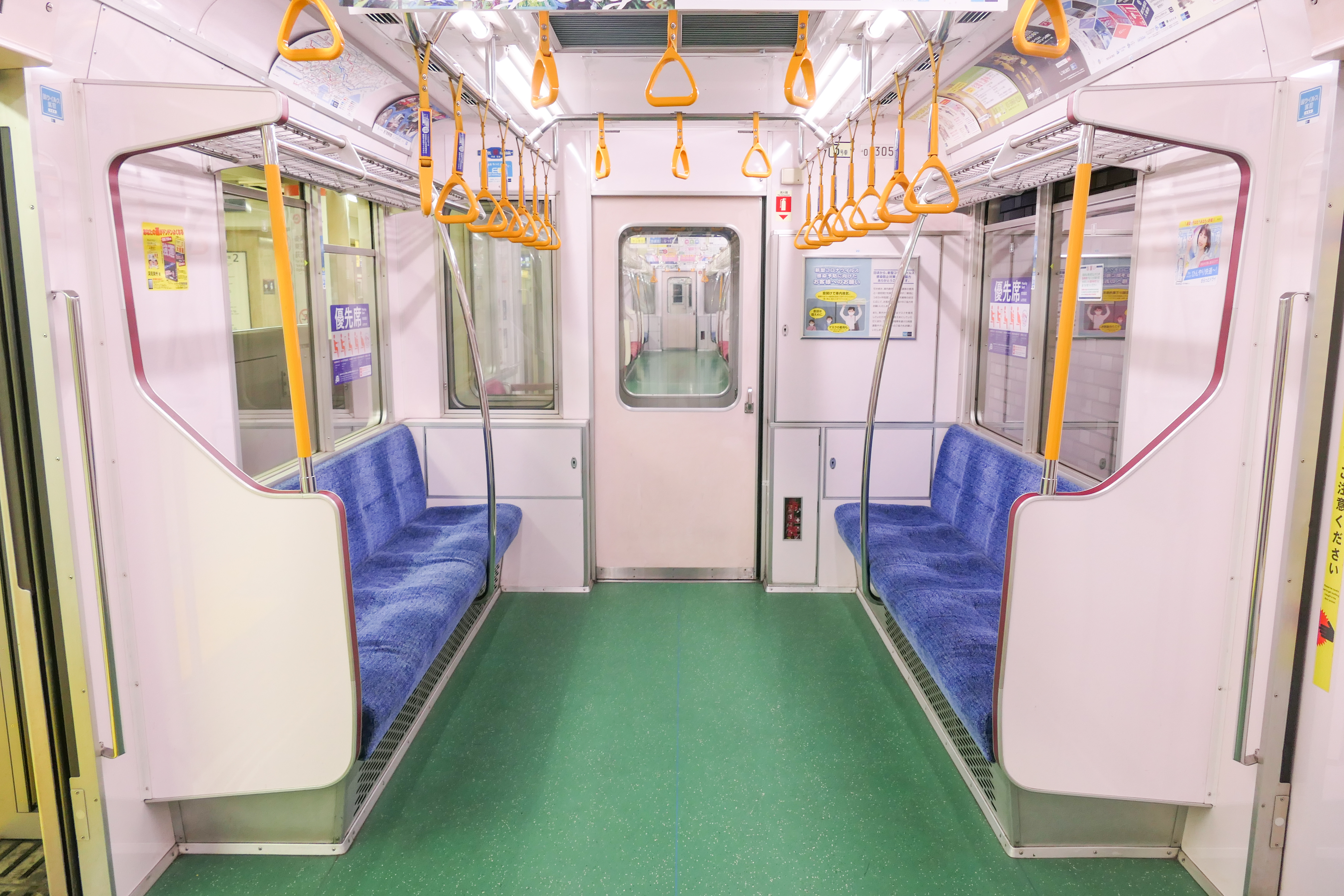
Refurbished interior (priority seating)

=== Withdrawal ===
A fleet of 53 new six-car trains was introduced in fiscal 2018 to replace the 02 series trains by fiscal 2023. The new trains are classified as Tokyo Metro 2000 series.

The last 02 series set was withdrawn on 29 December 2024.

=== Overseas use ===
Two 02 series cars were transferred to FEATI University in the Philippines for training use.
