= Nadal formula =

The Nadal formula, also called Nadal's formula, is an equation in railway design that relates the downward force exerted by a train's wheels upon the rail, with the lateral force of the wheel's flange against the face of the rail. This relationship is significant in railway design, as a wheel-climb derailment may occur if the lateral and vertical forces are not properly considered.

The Nadal formula is represented by: $\left(\frac{L}{V}\right){{=}}\left(\frac{\tan(\delta)-\mu}{1+\mu*\tan(\delta)}\right)$

In this equation, L and V refer to the lateral and vertical forces acting upon the rail and wheel, δ is the angle made when the wheel flange is in contact with the rail face, and μ is the coefficient of friction between the wheel and the rail.

Typically, the axle load for a railway vehicle should be such that the lateral forces of the wheel against the rail should not exceed 50% of the vertical down-force of the vehicle on the rail. Put another way, there should be twice as much downward force holding the wheel to the rail, as there is lateral force which will tend to cause the wheel to climb in turns. This ratio is accomplished by matching the wheelset with the appropriate rail profile to achieve the L/V ratio desired. If the L/V ratio gets too high, the wheel flange will be pressing against the rail face, and during a turn this will cause the wheel to climb the face of the rail, potentially derailing the railcar.

== Wagner Formula ==
The Nadal formula assumes the wheel remains perpendicular to the rail—it does not take into account hunting oscillation of the wheelset, or the movement of the wheel flange contact point against the rail.

A variation of the Nadal formula, which does take these factors into consideration, is the Wagner formula. As the wheelset yaws relative to the rail, the vertical force V is no longer completely vertical, but is now acting at an angle to the vertical, β. When this angle is factored into the Nadal formula, the result is the Wagner formula:

$\left(\frac{L}{V}\right){{=}}\left(\frac{\tan(\delta)-\mu*\cos\beta}{(1+\mu*\tan(\delta))*\cos\beta)}\right)$

When the vertical force is truly vertical (that is, β=0 and therefore cos(β)=1), the Wagner formula equals the Nadal formula.
