= Tokyo Metro 2000 series =

Japanese train type

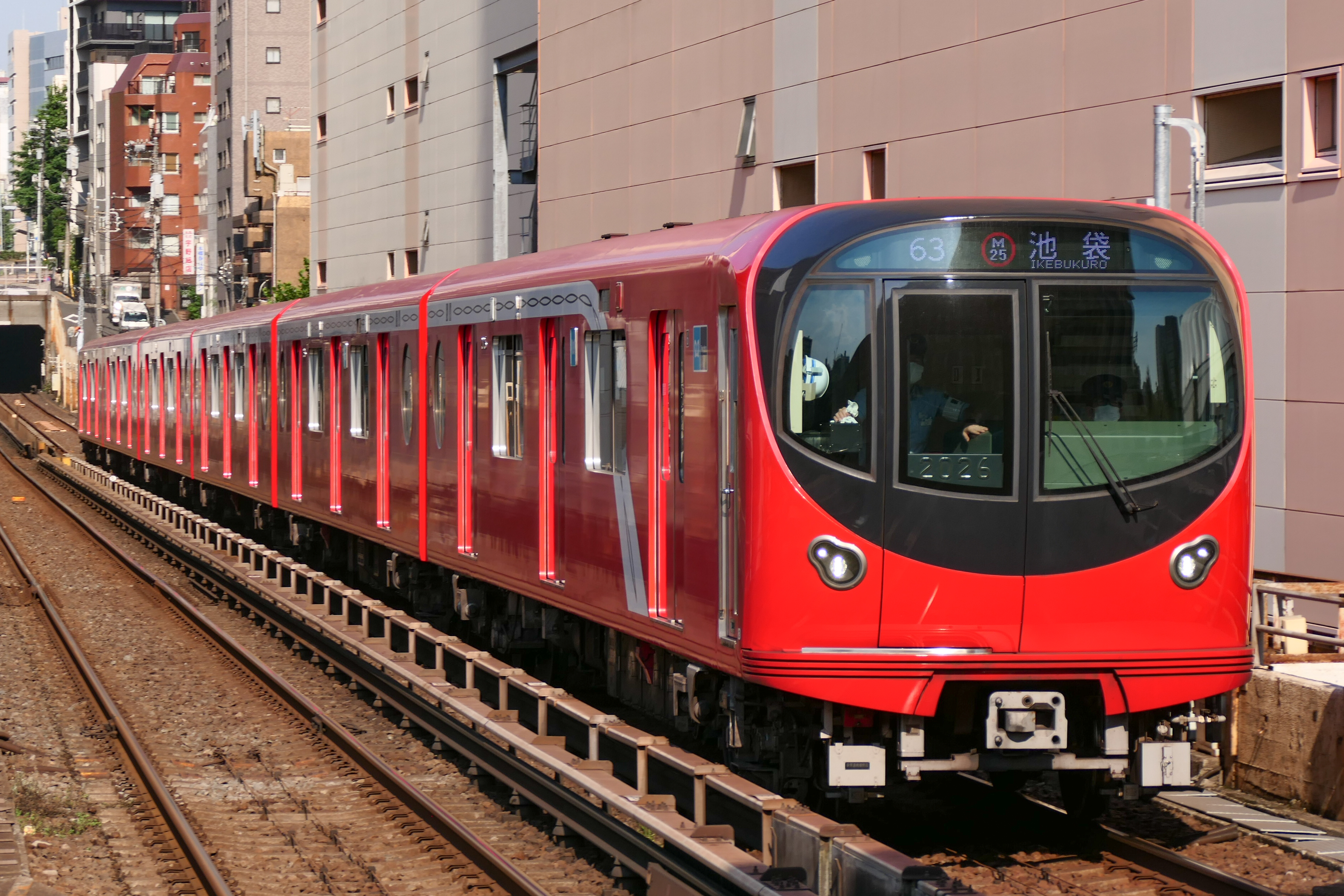
- A Marunouchi Line 2000 series train at Korakuen Station

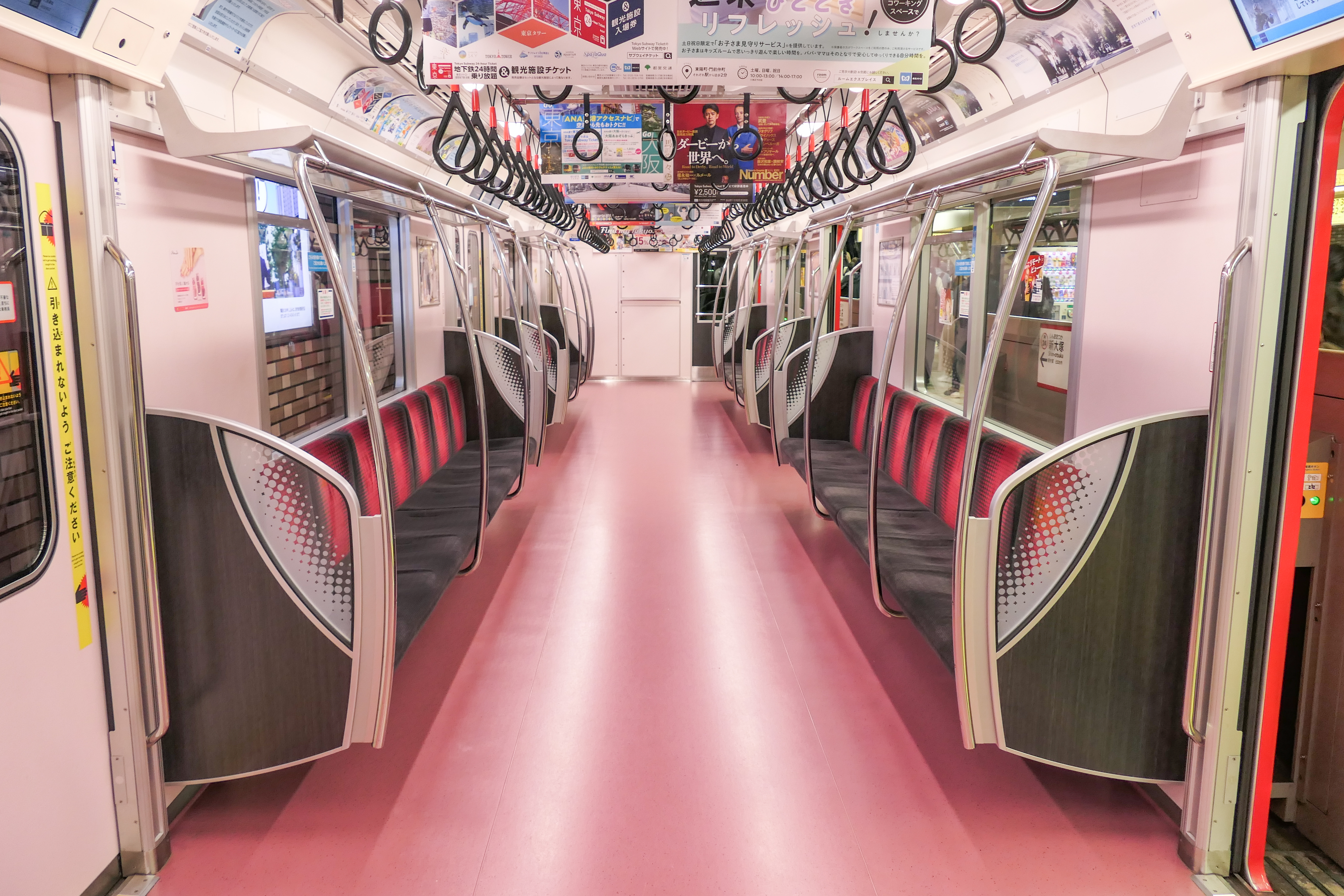
- Interior view of Tokyo Metro 2000 series
- In service: 2019–present
- Manufacturers: Nippon Sharyo, Kinki Sharyo
- Built at: Toyokawa, Aichi (Nippon Sharyo) and Osaka (Kinki Sharyo)
- Replaced: Tokyo Metro 02 series
- Constructed: 2018–2023
- Entered service: 23 February 2019
- Number built: 312 vehicles (52 sets) as of 26 January 2024
- Number in service: 312 vehicles (52 sets) as of 27 February 2024
- Formation: 6 cars per trainset
- Fleet numbers: 2101–2152
- Capacity: 122 (36 seating) (end cars), 137 (44 seating) (intermediate cars)
- Operator: Tokyo Metro
- Depots: Koishikawa, Nakano
- Line served: Marunouchi Line

Specifications
- Car length: 18 m (59 ft 1 in)
- Width: 2.78 m (9 ft 1 in)
- Height: 3.48 m (11 ft 5 in)
- Doors: 3 per side
- Maximum speed: 80 km/h (50 mph) (design); 75 km/h (47 mph) (service)
- Weight: 189.5 t (186.5 long tons; 208.9 short tons)
- Traction system: Toshiba PWM 2-level SiC-MOSFET–VVVF
- Traction motors: Toshiba 10 × permanent magnet synchronous motor
- Transmission: Westinghouse Natal (WN) drive; Gear ratio: 7.79 : 1
- Acceleration: 0.92 m/s^{2} (2.1 mph/s) (normal service); 0.97 m/s^{2} (2.2 mph/s) (ATO-enabled)
- Deceleration: 1.1 m/s^{2} (2.5 mph/s) (service); 1.4 m/s^{2} (3.1 mph/s) (emergency)
- Electric systems: 600 V DC third rail
- Current collection: Contact shoe
- UIC classification: (A1)(1A)+(A1)(1A)+(A1)(1A)+(A1)(1A)+(A1)(1A)+2′2′
- Bogies: SC108
- Braking system: ATC-controlled ECP brakes with TRT-11 type regenerative braking
- Safety systems: New CS-ATC (ATO), TASC, Mitsubishi CBTC
- Coupling system: Tomlinson
- Track gauge: 1,435 mm (4 ft 8 1/2 in) standard gauge

The Tokyo Metro 2000 series (東京メトロ2000系, Tōkyō Metoro 2000-kei) is an electric multiple unit (EMU) train type operated by Tokyo Metro for use on the Marunouchi Line in Tokyo, Japan. They serve as a replacement for the Tokyo Metro 02 series that was in service on the Marunouchi Line from 1988 to 2024.

== Technical specifications ==
The trains are built by Nippon Sharyo and Kinki Sharyo, with Toshiba supplying the electrical equipment. They are fitted with permanent magnet synchronous motors and silicon carbide traction inverters, which are expected to reduce the power consumption by about 20%, compared to the previous Tokyo Metro 02 series.

Self-steering axles similar to those of the 1000 series are fitted to the bogies.

== Formation ==
The trains are formed as six-car sets.

== Interior ==
The seating accommodation consists of longitudinal seating. The cars are air conditioned, with feature round windows at the car ends. They also have power outlets for passengers to charge their mobile devices.

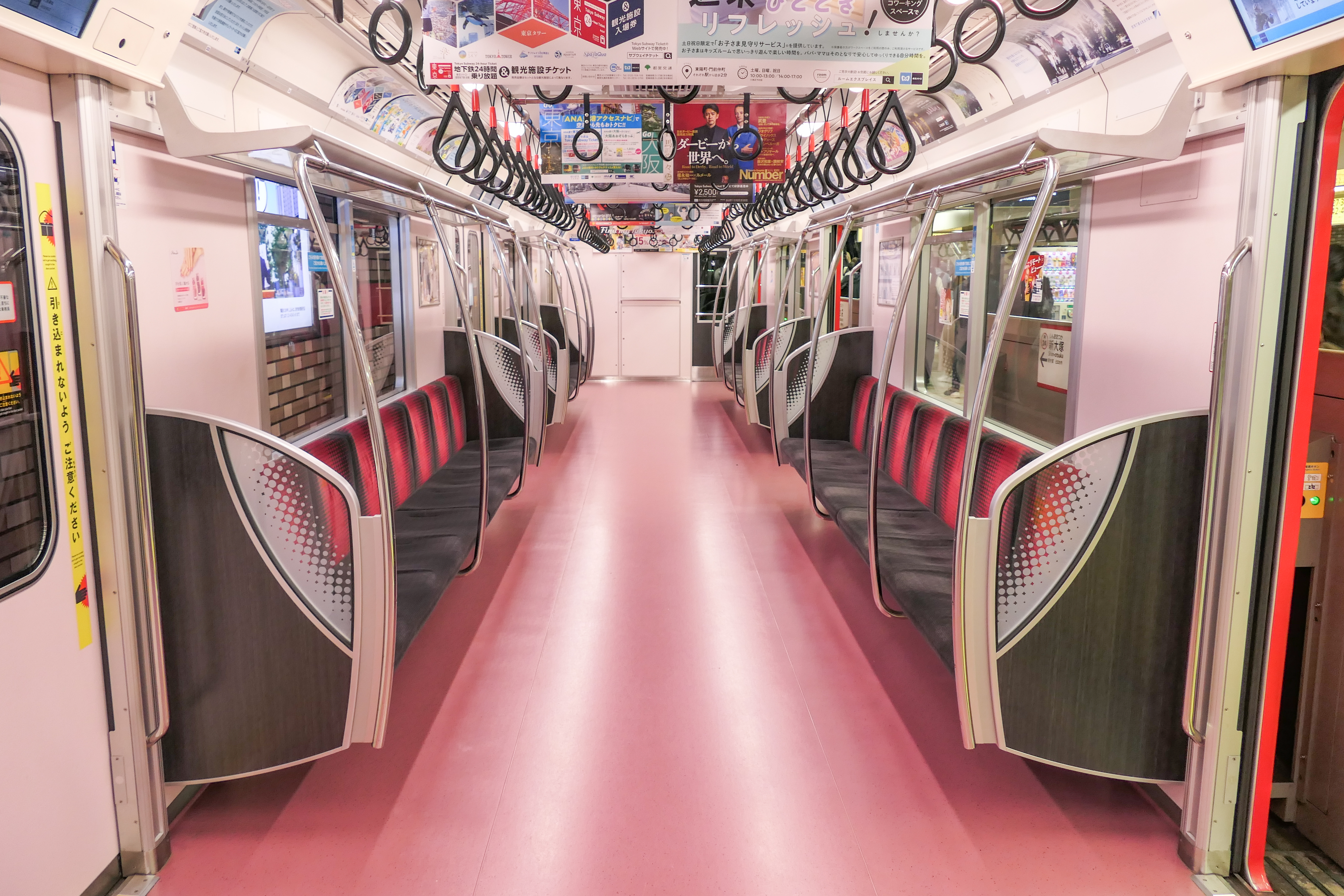
Interior view

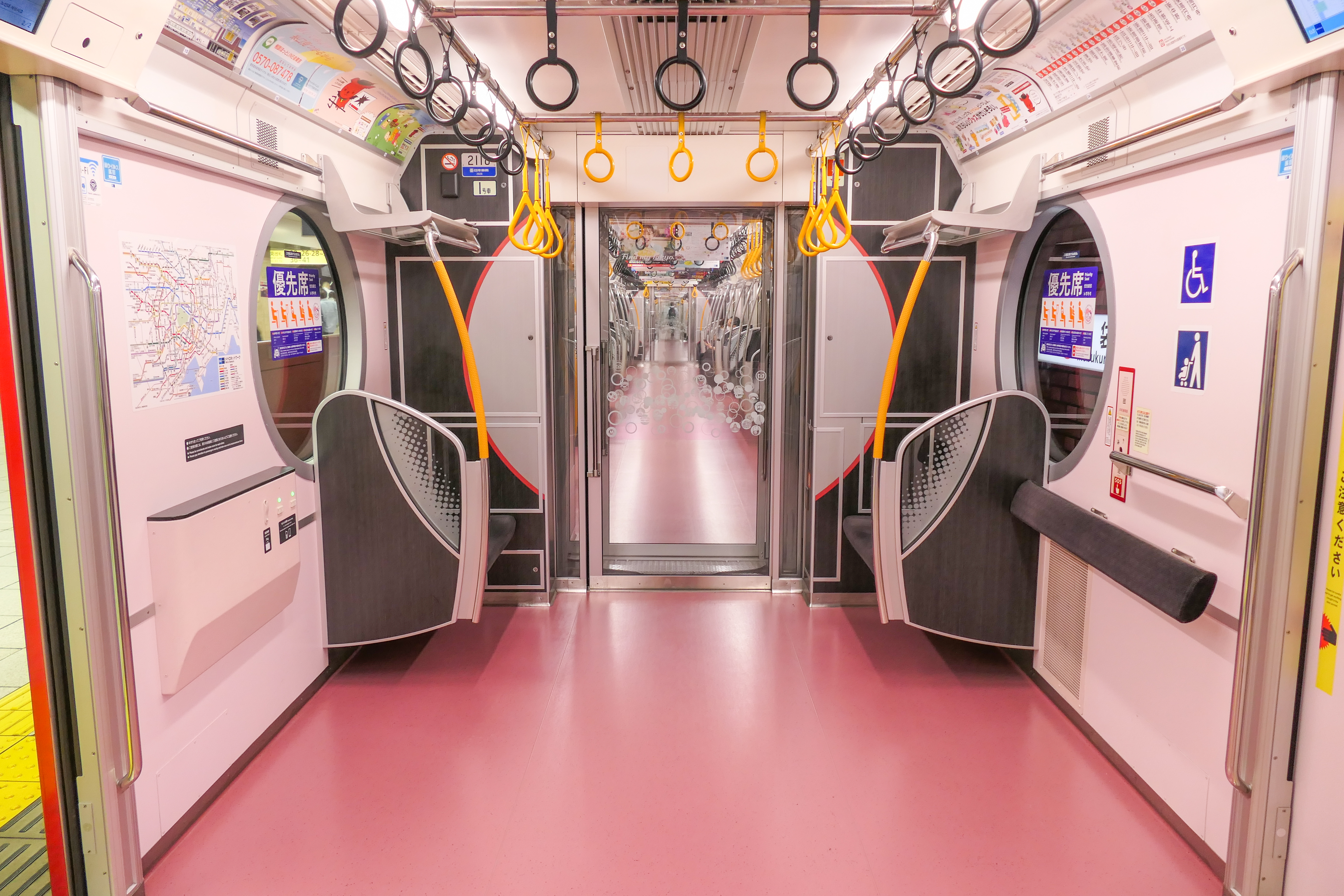
Interior view at the end of a car

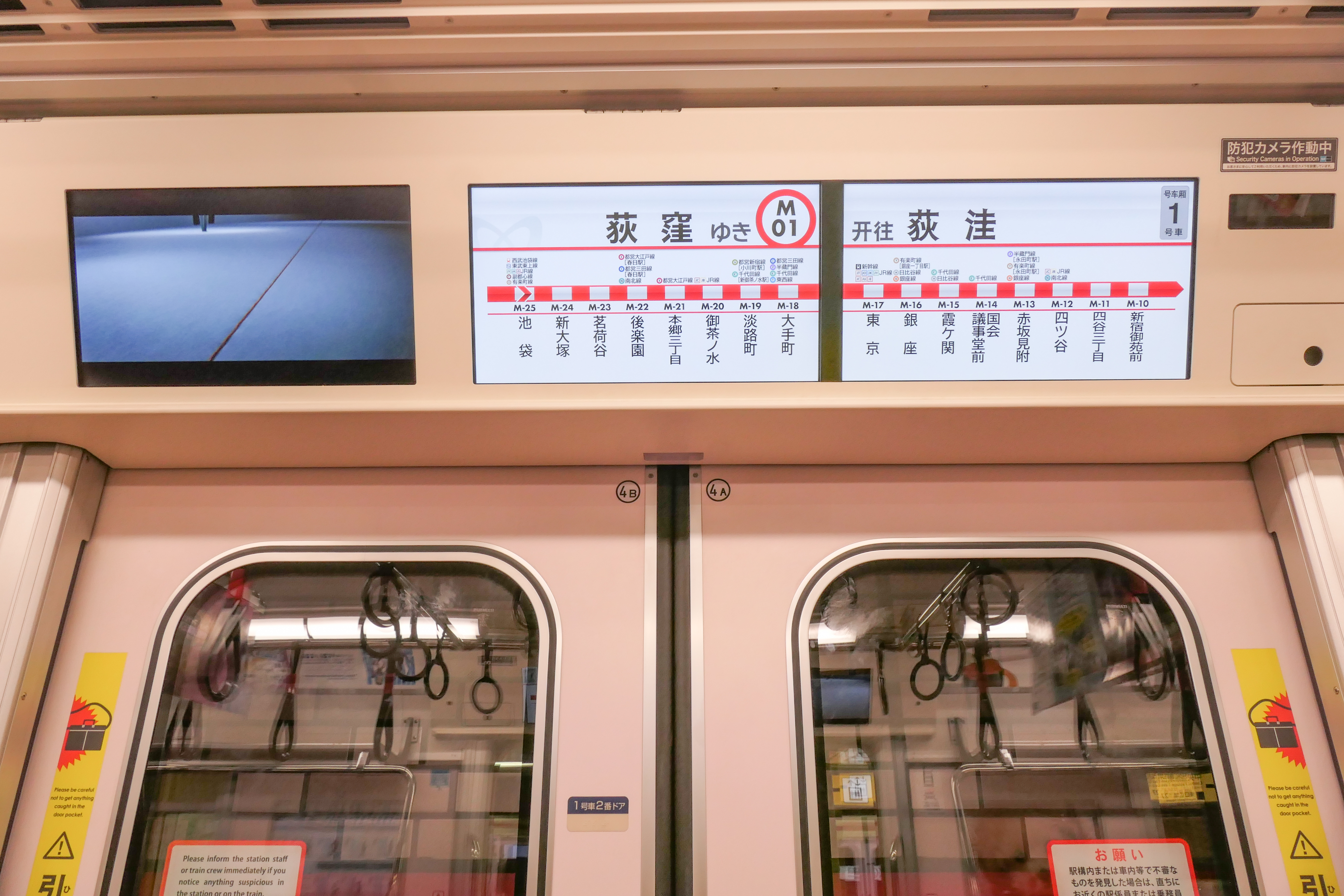
Passenger information displays

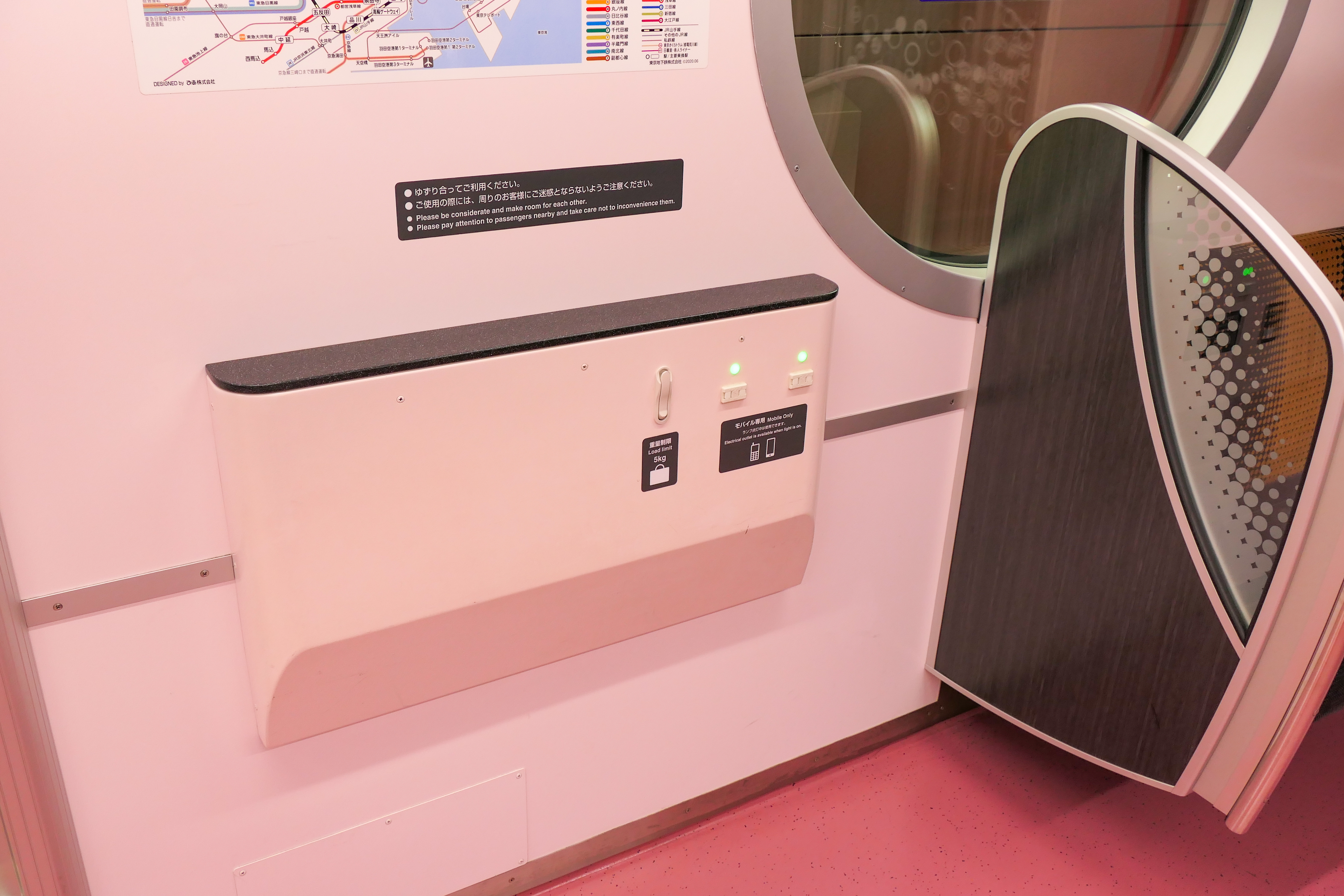
Power outlets

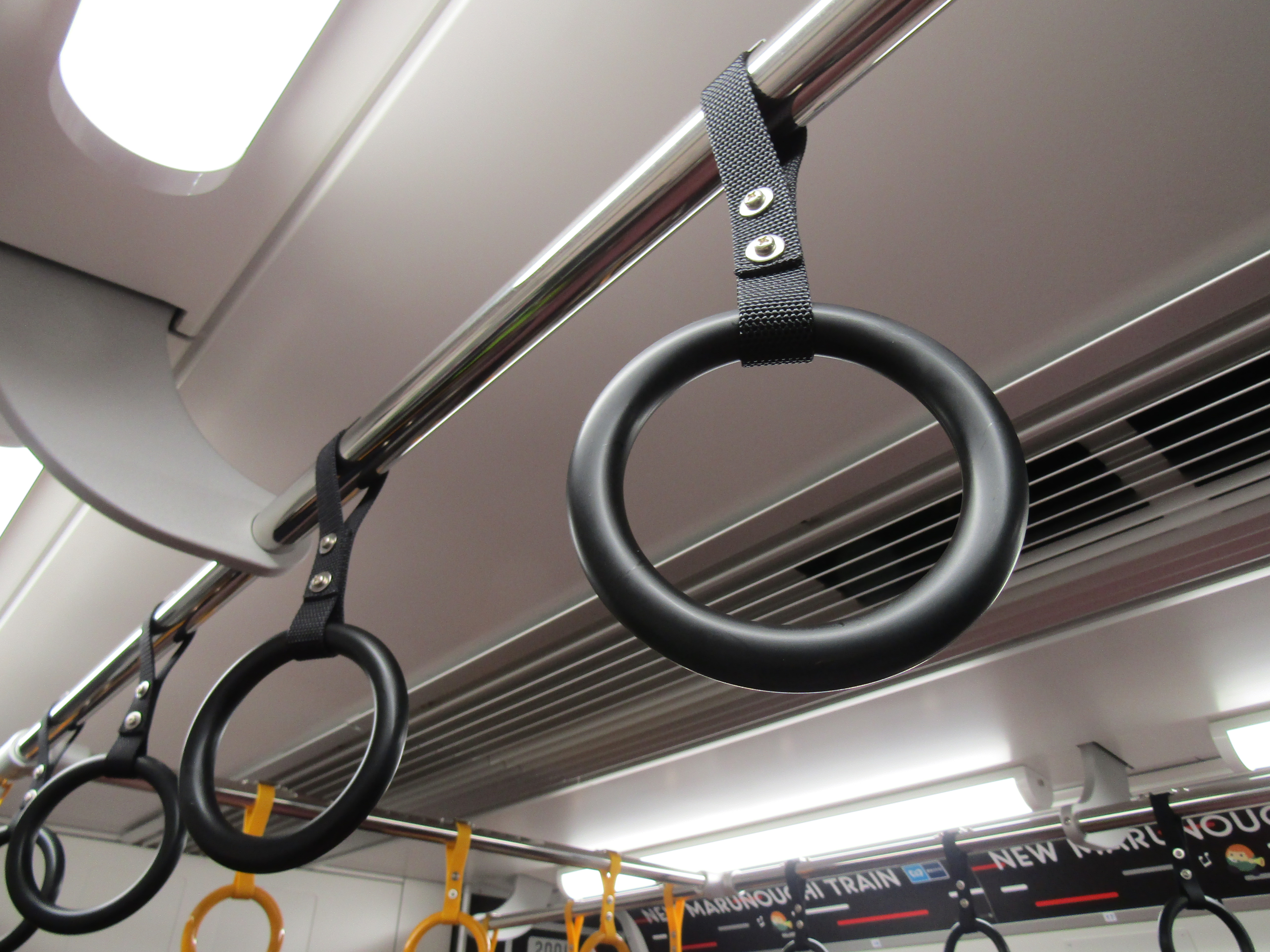
Circular grab handle

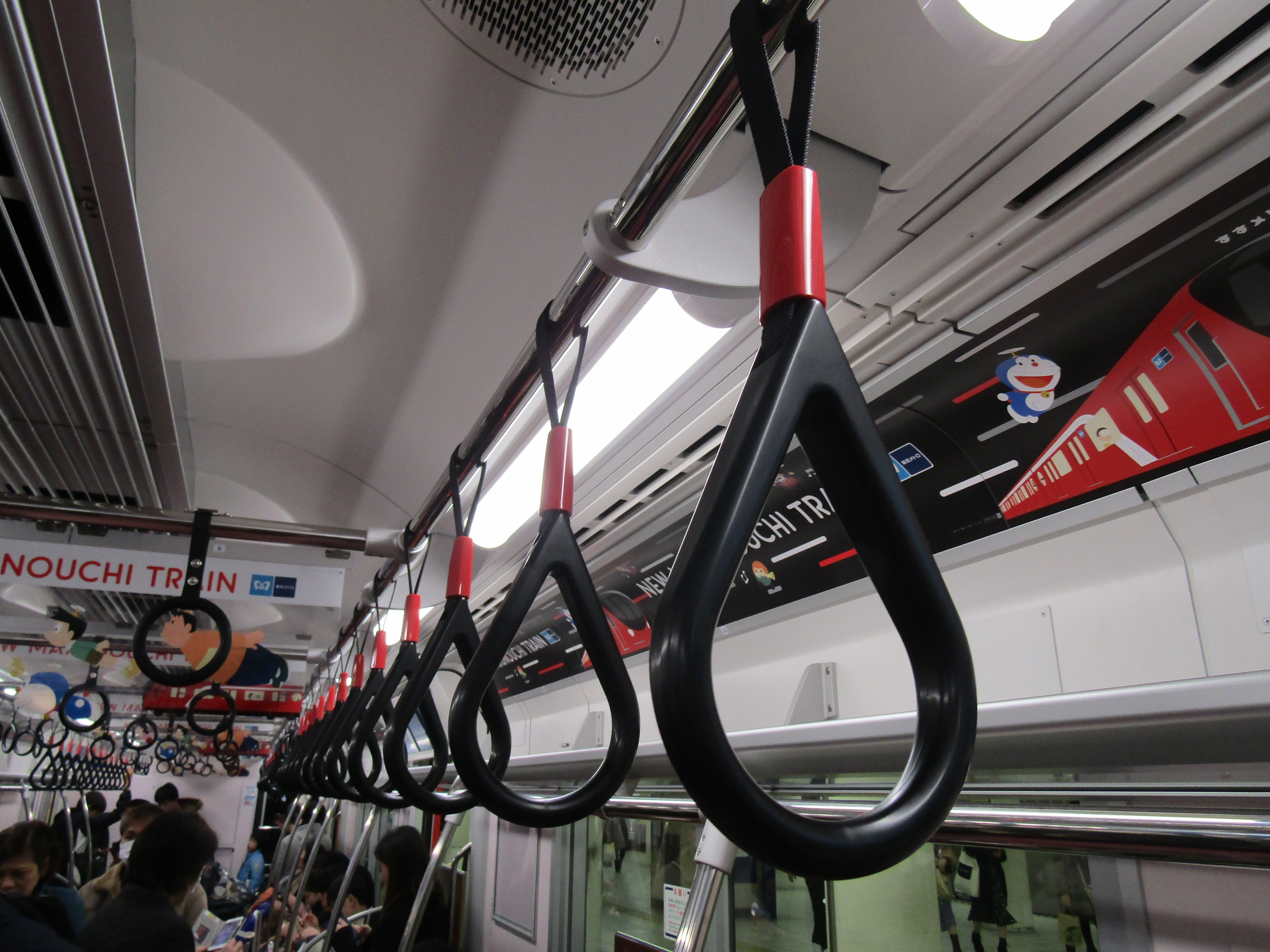
Teardrop-shaped grab handle

== History ==
In March 2018, Tokyo Metro announced plans to introduce a new fleet of 53 six-car sets (318 cars) for the Marunouchi Line, which would replace the Tokyo Metro 02 series. The first trainset was unveiled to the press on 11 October 2018. The trains are scheduled to enter revenue service in February 2019, with the introduction of all 53 sets by fiscal 2022. The trains entered service on 23 February 2019. In March 2020, it was announced that the number of sets has been reduced to 52 sets (312 cars), being delivered until fiscal 2023.

=== Build histories ===
The delivery dates for the fleet are as shown below as of 2024.

| Set No. | Date delivered |
|---|---|
| 2101 | 19 August 2018 |
| 2102 | 21 October 2018 |
| 2103 | 10 February 2019 |
| 2104 | 4 March 2019 |
| 2105 | 24 March 2019 |
| 2106 | 14 April 2019 |
| 2107 | 5 May 2019 |
| 2108 | 2 June 2019 |
| 2109 | 23 June 2019 |
| 2110 | 14 July 2019 |
| 2111 | 11 August 2019 |
| 2112 | 1 September 2019 |
| 2113 | 22 September 2019 |
| 2114 | 3 November 2019 |
| 2115 | 24 November 2019 |
| 2116 | 15 December 2019 |
| 2117 | 12 January 2020 |
| 2118 | 2 February 2020 |
| 2119 | 23 February 2020 |
| 2120 | 15 March 2020 |
| 2121 | 5 April 2020 |
| 2122 | 24 May 2020 |
| 2123 | 14 June 2020 |
| 2124 | 5 July 2020 |
| 2125 | 1 August 2020 |
| 2126 | 13 September 2020 |
| 2127 | 11 October 2020 |
| 2128 | 8 November 2020 |
| 2129 | 6 December 2020 |
| 2130 | 17 January 2021 |
| 2131 | 7 February 2021 |
| 2132 | 1 March 2021 |
| 2133 | 3 December 2021 |
| 2134 | 9 September 2022 |
| 2135 | 30 September 2022 |
| 2136 | 21 October 2022 |
| 2137 | 11 November 2022 |
| 2138 | 9 December 2022 |
| 2139 | 26 January 2024 |
| 2140 | 5 January 2024 |
| 2141 | 12 December 2023 |
| 2142 | 11 November 2023 |
| 2143 | 7 April 2023 |
| 2144 | 28 April 2023 |
| 2145 | 19 May 2023 |
| 2146 | 9 June 2023 |
| 2147 | 30 June 2023 |
| 2148 | 20 July 2023 |
| 2149 | 11 August 2023 |
| 2150 | 1 September 2023 |
| 2151 | 21 September 2023 |
| 2152 | 13 October 2023 |
