= Data.gov.in =

Data portal of the government of India

Data Portal India
- Website type: Government services
- Available in: English
- Owner: Indian Government
- Website: data.gov.in
- Commercial: No
- Registration: Optional
- Launched: 2012, October
- Current status: Active

Open Government Data (OGD) Platform India or data.gov.in is a platform for supporting Open data initiative of Government of India. This portal is a single-point access to datasets, documents, services, tools and applications published by ministries, departments and organisations of the Government of India. It combines and expands the best features of India government's India.gov.in and the U.S. government's data.gov project. It houses over 230,000 datasets as of July 2026, many of them updated regularly. It also provides API access to the datasets.

== History ==
After announcing the launch of the site in June 2011, the site was launched in October 2012. part of the Open Government Initiative was launched during October 2012, in compliance with the National Data Sharing and Accessibility Policy (NDSAP) of India, Gazette notified in March 2012.

According to the preamble of NDSAP, there has been an increasing demand by the community that data collected with the deployment of public funds should be made more readily available to all, for enabling rational debate, better decision making and use in meeting civil society needs.

The policy envisages proactive dissemination of data by Government ministries, departments, organizations.

== Overview ==
The site is based on Drupal Framework, and has four major modules:

- Data Management System (DMS): This facilitates publishing of datasets/applications by authorised users from Ministries/Departments/Organisations.
- Content Management System (CMS): This module is used to update or create content and functionalities for Data Portal India.
- Visitor Relationship Management (VRM): This module facilitates collation and dissemination of feedback/suggestions received on Data Portal India.
- Communities: People with specific interest can connect through online communities.

The product is developed based on the Open Government platform and its source code is available on GitHub.

== Open Government Data (OGD) Platform India ==
Open Government Data (OGD) Platform India was developed jointly by India & US government as a result of announcement made by President Obama and Prime Minister Shri Manmohan Singh during the Indo-US Open Government Dialogue in 2010.

Open data platform is a being implemented in US as their data.gov. In India the platform was further customised by National Informatics Centre (NIC) in line with the National Data Sharing Accessibility Policy to develop the Data Portal India.

Open data platform is also being offered to other countries. Ghana and Rwanda are also being powered by Open data platform.

== See also ==
- National Data Sharing and Accessibility Policy – Government of India
- data.gov
- data.gov.uk
- India.gov.in
- My Gov
- USAFacts
- India Data Portal
