= ODC =

ODC may refer to:

- ODC/Dance, a San Francisco-based dance company
- Open Data Charter, concerning governmental open data
- Open Data Commons, a set of legal tools for open data
- Orbital Data Center, see Space-based data center
- Ordinary Decent Criminal (slang), used by Irish police force
- Ornithine decarboxylase, an enzyme
- Orthogonal Defect Classification
- Organic Disease Control, in aeroponics
- Other Direct Costs, a term used in Accounting
