= Corruption in Canada =

Corruption in Canada is the use of political power for private gain by Canadian government officials.

Canada had the distinction of being the least corrupt government in the Americas in 2023, as measured by the Corruption Perceptions Index. Conflicts of interest within government, tax evasion, and the prevalence of money laundering in areas such as British Columbia are among the leading factors of corruption in Canada.

Canada ranks at the bottom of the bribery-fighting rankings with "little or no enforcement of anti-bribery measures". The 2014 Ernst & Young global fraud survey found that "twenty percent of Canadian executives believe bribery and corruption are widespread in this country".

== Corruption by region ==
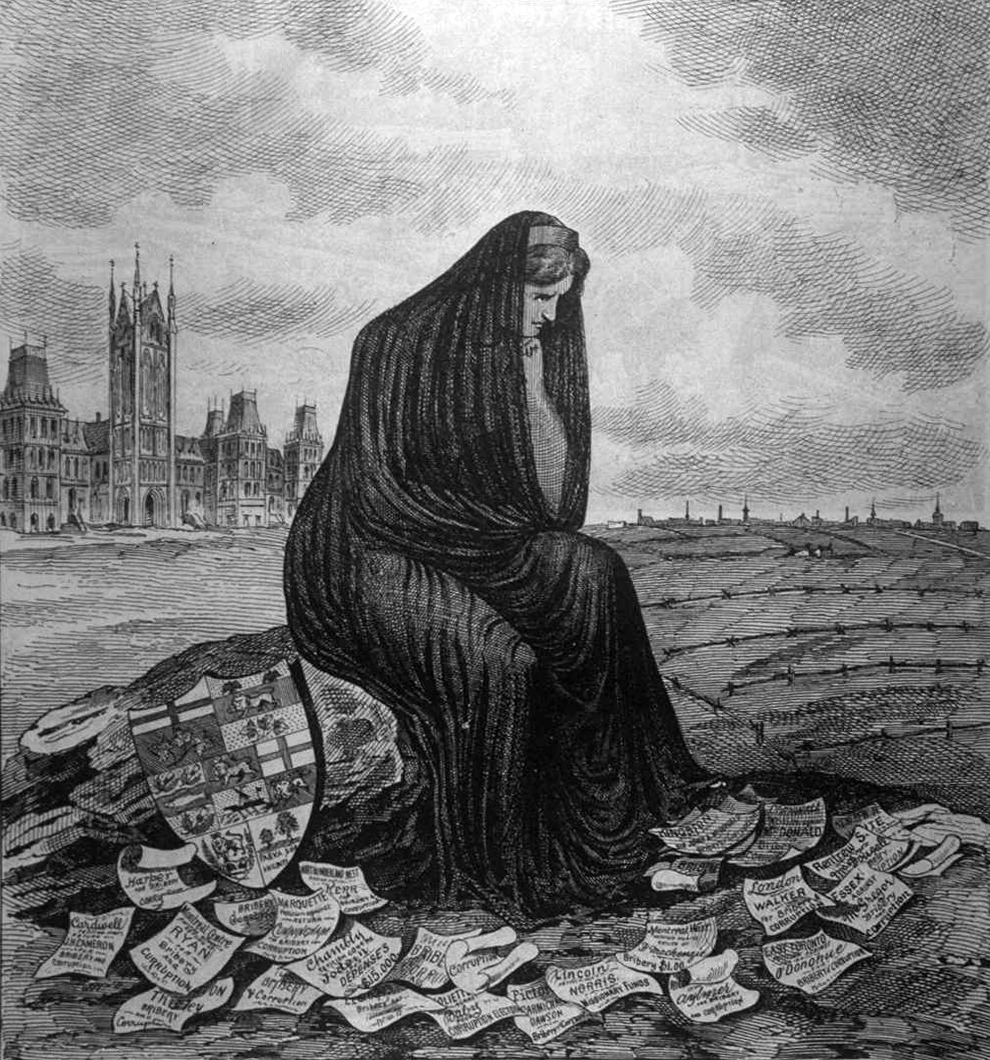
"Les remords de la patrie" (translation: Remorse of the country), engraving in L'opinion publique in 1874

=== Alberta ===
In February 2025, Athana Mentzelopoulos, the former head of Alberta Health Services, alleged that Alberta premier Danielle Smith's government dismissed her two days before she was scheduled to meet with the province's auditor-general to discuss her investigation into inflated procurement contracts and contracting processes surrounding AHS's relationship and contracts with MHCare, a company owned by Sam Mraiche, who facilitated the importation of children's medicine from Turkey, and Alberta Surgical Group (ASG), a private surgical outlet. Mraiche was previously noted for providing free Edmonton Oilers playoff tickets to five members of Smith's cabinet in 2024. He also profited $300,000 by flipping a west Edmonton parcel of land to the provincial government. Doug Wylie, the auditor-general, said that he is examining procurement and contracting processes within AHS. In March 2025, the RCMP launched an investigation after a complaint was raised.

=== Ontario ===
The Ontario Liberal Party, under leader and Ontario premier Kathleen Wynne, was involved in corruption cases that included bribery during elections. Prominent Liberal Party fundraiser Gerry Lougheed Jr. was charged by the Ontario Provincial Police (OPP). and was later acquitted.

The Royal Canadian Mounted Police alleged that the Ontario Provincial Police Association union leaders committed fraud and are guilty of money laundering and corruption. These included President James (Jim) Christie, Vice-president Martin Bain and Chief Administrative Officer Karl Walsh. The charges include "unusual investment of union money in condos in the Bahamas", "formation of a company to provide exclusive travel services for both union business and personal travel by members", "formation of a consulting company" that billed the union $5000 per month, and for "questionable vacation and travel expenses billed to the union".

=== Quebec ===
The Charbonneau Commission was established in 2011 to investigate corruption in Quebec. It has uncovered long running, widespread corruption including "price-fixing schemes among construction companies bidding on municipal governments", "illegal donations to the province's major political parties from some of its biggest engineering firms" and links between the Fédération des travailleurs et travailleuses du Québec, the Quebec Federation of Labour (FTQ), the province's biggest federation of unions, and organized crime.

In 2015, employees of the EBR Information Technology firm, IBM Canada and Revenu Québec were arrested for fraud, conspiracy and breach of trust in relation to computer equipment and services contracts to the provincial government. There are widespread "financial and management irregularities with the Quebec government's computer networks."

On January 26, 2017, former mayor of Montreal, Michael Applebaum, was found guilty of 8 corruption-related charges. Applebaum was found guilty in relation to cash kickbacks related to real estate development projects and a municipal contract for the management and maintenance of the NDG Sports Centre.

== Corruption by sector ==
=== Health ===
Dr. Shiv Chopra, a former employee of Health Canada and a whistle-blower, has criticized Health Canada for circumventing safety and efficacy regulations to please product manufacturers, for systematic collusion with corporations in "extra-parliamentary decisions involving the imposition of new risks on society" and for overlooking the responsibility to protect health and humans, in pursuit of capital-making profits". Dr. Michele Brill-Edwards had previously expressed similar concerns, noting that whistleblowers were not sufficiently protected by Canada's existing legislation.

In Alberta, a medical inquiry established the existence of queue-jumping and illegal fast-tracking of private clinic referrals. Alberta's former head of Health Services, Stephen Duckett, noted that "preferential access to care was a common practice when he took over and politicians had fixers who could get valued constituents faster treatment."

=== Law enforcement ===
The RCMP's own study found 330 internal corruption cases between 1995 and 2005. "Improperly giving out police information was the most common type of corrupt behaviour, followed by fraud, misuse of police officer status, theft and interference with the judicial process." These numbers are likely an understatement of true levels, as the RCMP has admitted not tracking "hundreds of cases of serious misconduct committed by Mounties across the country for years". Also, in 2013, nearly 300 current and former female Mounties joined a class-action lawsuit alleging harassment.

As of 2023, the Canadian Border Services Agency (CBSA) is the only public safety department without an external civilian review body, and several proposed bills to create a watchdog body for the organisation have failed. Each year, the CBSA conducts hundreds of internal investigations into allegations of employee misconduct, including sexual harassment, missing money, and criminal associations. The CBSA generally distances itself from blame by claiming that such offenses are committed by a minority of employees, and are not representative of the entire agency. External government reports state that employees sometimes have a fear of reprisals for reporting wrongdoing. Despite legislation known as ATIP, or Access to Information Policy, acquiring statistics, or reports, is also a complex process, that can take months despite the standard 60-day law to comply and appeals to the Public Service Integrity Commission are often "Well Founded."

In 2016, the Toronto Police Service faced several high-profile cases of corruption and disproportionate use of force. Constable James Forcillo was found guilty of attempted murder in the death of 18-year-old Sammy Yatim. Four police officers were arrested and charged with "nine counts of obstructing justice and eight counts of perjury".

== Government and civil service ==
=== Employment insurance overcharges ===
In the late 1990s and 2000s, the Government of Canada illegally overcharged Canadians with respect to employment insurance premiums. The overcharges exceeded $40 billion. As noted by the Auditor General of Canada in her 2004 report:

Parliament did not intend, in my view, that the Account would accumulate a surplus beyond what could reasonably be spent for employment insurance purposes, given the existing benefit structure, while also providing for an economic downturn. Accordingly, in my opinion, the Government did not observe the intent of the Employment Insurance Act.

On December 11, 2008, the Supreme Court of Canada ruled that the overcharges were unlawful. As stated by the Supreme Court of Canada in Confédération des syndicats nationaux v. Canada (Attorney General):

[96] For these reasons, I would therefore allow the appeals in part and declare that the versions of ss. 66.1 and 66.3 of the Employment Insurance Act that applied in 2002, 2003 and 2005 are invalid and that employers' and employees' premiums for 2002, 2003 and 2005 were collected unlawfully.

=== Transparency International Ranking ===
On Transparency International's 2025 Corruption Perceptions Index, Canada scored 75 on a scale from 0 ("highly corrupt") to 100 ("very clean"). When ranked by score, Canada ranked 16th among the 182 countries in the Index, where the country ranked first is perceived to have the most honest public sector. For comparison with regional scores, the highest score among the countries of the Americas (Note: Argentina, Bahamas, Barbados, Belize, Bolivia, Brazil, Canada, Chile, Colombia, Costa Rica, Cuba, Dominica, Dominican Republic, Ecuador, El Salvador, Grenada, Guatemala, Guyana, Haiti, Honduras, Jamaica, Mexico, Nicaragua, Panama, Paraguay, Peru, Saint Lucia, Saint Vincent and the Grenadines, Suriname, Trinidad and Tobago, United States of America, Uruguay, Venezuela) was Canada's, 75, the average score was 42 and the lowest score was 10. For comparison with worldwide scores, the best score was 89 (ranked 1), the average score was 42, and the worst score was 9 (ranked 181, in a two-way tie).

== Notable corruption cases ==
- Pacific Scandal 1871–1874
- Sponsorship scandal 1996–2004
- Tunagate 1985
- Temporary foreign worker program in Canada widespread abuse and violations
- Ontario power plant scandal
- Ornge scandal

=== Panama Papers ===
No Canadian politicians' names from the national government have surfaced in the Panama Papers as of the end of May 2016. The Globe and Mail did ask Prime Minister Justin Trudeau, whose name did not appear in either of the document releases, about this, for the record. He told reporters that he does not have any money in offshore accounts, and had "entirely and completely been transparent about mine and my family's finances. That is something I learned early on that Canadians expect from their leaders."

Some names of Canadian individuals did appear in the leaked documents, according to the ICIJ investigation partner, the Toronto Star.

=== Paradise Papers ===
More than 3,000 Canadian names, including three former prime ministers, current Liberal party operatives, a hockey team, trusts, foundations and individuals are identified in the Paradise Papers relating to offshore accounts. The documents link Stephen Bronfman, the chief liberal party fund-raiser and close aide to Prime Minister Justin Trudeau, to tax avoidance schemes. Tax expert Marwah Rizqy has noted that if these documents are proven accurate, they contain the "smoking gun" linking Stephen Bronfman to illegal tax sheltering/avoidance.

=== SNC-Lavalin ===
The SNC-Lavalin affair is a notable instance of corruption in Canada, in which Canadian construction company SNC-Lavalin (now AtkinsRéalis) allegedly paid US$48 million in bribes to Libyan officials and was offered a deferred prosecution agreement in relation to these charges. The scandal resulted in the resignation of several members of Prime Minister Justin Trudeau's cabinet.

== Anti-corruption mechanisms ==
=== Public Service Commission ===
Canada's public service is set up to work independently from the political party in power. The mandate of the Public Service Commission is to protect the public service from political interference and "ensure professional, non-partisan public service". The Office of Public Service Values and Ethics is tasked with implementing values, ethics and policies to prevent corruption.

The Conservative government of Stephen Harper has been criticized for political interference in various administrative bodies, including Statistics Canada, Elections Canada, the Canadian Military Complaints Commission, the Canadian Nuclear Safety Commission, Public Works and the Supreme Court.

=== Auditor General, Ombudsman ===
Canada's federal and provincial governments have independent and strong Auditor General offices. The Auditor-General reports to the Parliament, not to the cabinet, and conducts annual and special audits to examine the government's activities and hold it to account. Auditor-General reports have brought to light major scandals, corruption, waste and inefficiencies, and led to changes in governments.

Ombudsman offices are tasked with investigating public complaints about the government. Special ombudsmen or commissioners are tasked with investigating and reporting to Parliament about key areas. The Privacy Commissioner of Canada, the Environment and Sustainable Development Commissioner and the Information Commissioner of Canada are examples of these special offices.

=== Civilian oversight bodies ===
Civilian oversight bodies are used to hold organizations accountable, to assess the power of and provide input for governmental and industrial bodies. They are specially used to hold the police, the RCMP, the military and the CSIS accountable.

In 2012, the Office of the Inspector General, which was a key oversight body for Canada's spy agency CSIS, was abolished by the Conservative government. The government said the oversight functions were consolidated within the civilian Security Intelligence Review Committee.

=== Access to Information Act ===
Canada's Access to Information Act came into force in 1983. However, in recent years, the legislation has been severely criticized for being outdated and ineffective. The Centre for Law and Democracy ranks Canada 56th out of 95 countries in terms of the strength of the Access to Information legislation. As of 2015, there are thousands of individuals employed full-time throughout all levels of government and their agencies tasked with processing formal requests for access to information; this represents a cost to the Canadian taxpayer of hundreds of millions of dollars annually and does not include additional expenses including outside legal and other professional opinions, tribunal hearings, motions and appeals in courts, multiple access to information commissions and tribunals across the country, and various other expenses lead to system costs of approximately $200 million.

An investigation by the Information Commissioner of Canada has found that the Conservative government's staff had systematically interfered with the processing of access to information requests.

=== Conflict of Interest laws ===
All levels of government enforce conflict of interest laws for civil servants and politicians. The laws generally require disclosure of actual or perceived conflicts of interest and appropriate measures, such as recusal from decisions.

Conflict of interest laws have been used to highlight an array of improper dealings by politicians. For instance, in 2015, an Ethics Commissioner report found "Government Services Minister Diane Finley breached conflict-of-interest rules by giving preferential treatment and federal funding to a project" that received "one of its lowest ratings" in an assessment done by the Department of Human Resources and Skills Development. The project proposal was submitted by the Canadian Federation of Chabad Lubavitch by Ottawa rabbi Chaim Mendelsohn, who had close ties to the Conservative party, the Prime Minister's Office and then-foreign affairs minister John Baird."

=== Federal Accountability Act ===
The Federal Accountability Act is a major anti-corruption legislation passed in 2006 by the Harper Conservative government. It introduced several mechanisms to combat corruption, including the Commissioner of Lobbying, the Parliamentary Budget Officer, the Public Sector Integrity Commissioner, the Ethics Commissioner, limits to election donations and enhancements to lobbying rules.

=== Public Servants Disclosure Protection Act ===
The Public Servants Disclosure Protection Act is a whistleblower protection act. The Act "provides a confidential process for employees in Canada's federal public sector to come forward with any information about possible wrongdoing within the federal government and state corporations", except the Canadian Security Intelligence Service (CSIS), the Communications Security Establishment Canada (CSEC) and the Canadian Forces.

=== Corruption of Foreign Public Officials Act ===
Canada signed and agreed to implement the OECD Anti-Bribery Convention and the OECD Convention on Combating Bribery of Foreign Public Officials in International Business Transactions. The Corruption of Foreign Public Officials Act (CFPOA) was enacted in 1999. The CFPOA applies to persons and companies, aiming to prevent and punish the acts of bribery of foreign public officials to obtain or retain a business advantage. Companies have to develop effective compliance programs with a focus on specific areas relevant to the CFPOA.

The law aims to monitor, punish and prevent bribery and other criminal acts being committed by Canadians and Canadian companies in foreign countries. In 2014, Ottawa consultant Nazir Karigar was the first person to be convicted under this law. He was convicted of the Air India bribery scheme.

A 2013 progress report indicates that Canada has failed to implement many of the recommendations and earns an overall score of "Moderate". The OECD criticized Canada for a lack of prosecutions and a lack of resource allocation to address corruption.

=== Open data, open government, and transparency initiatives ===
Canadian governments at all levels and citizen organizations have undertaken various Open data, Open government and transparency initiatives. The Open Government Strategy was launched by the federal government in March 2011. Various datasets have been released under municipal open data initiatives such as Toronto Open Data. Sharing of MP/MPP/Councilor expenses online, sunshine lists, posting detailed program budgets and expenditures online and crime statistics are some examples of open data being released online. Open data has increased public scrutiny of abuses, helping monitor, prosecute and prevent corruption.

=== International conventions and transparency initiatives ===
Canada has ratified the United Nations Convention against Corruption and the OECD Anti-Bribery Convention.

The government of Canada is part of the multilateral Open Government Partnership initiative. Canada joined the International Aid Transparency Initiative (IATI) in 2011. Canada was a supporting country to the Extractive Industries Transparency Initiative, and it intends to implement the EITI.

=== First Nations Financial Transparency Act ===
The First Nations Financial Transparency Act was created in 2013 by the Harper Conservative government, to increase financial transparency in First Nations Communities. The First Nations Financial Transparency Act requires First Nation bands to publicly disclose their financial statements, including the salary information of their councillors. Disclosure of this information has highlighted relatively high salaries of many chiefs, in comparison to the extreme poverty of their members. For instance, the Shuswap band has 87 on-reserve members. Take into account that this is only a few dollars per day when the total amount is divided by the number of tribespeople. Its Chief, Paul Sam, earned $202,413 in tax-free salary while many band members endured winters without water or electricity. The First Nations Financial Transparency Act has promoted higher vigilance regarding band leadership's activities and financial management by members and fellow councilors.

On December 18, 2015, Minister of Indigenous and Northern Affairs Carolyn Bennett announced that the Liberal government would stop enforcing the Act, and would "suspend any court actions against First Nations who have not complied with the Act", releasing funds withheld from First Nations communities that have not complied with the Act.

=== Integrity Regime ===
The Government of Canada's Integrity Regime prohibits the federal government from doing business with any company if "they, or members of their board of directors, have been convicted or absolutely/conditionally discharged in the last three years" of corruption or malpractice offences, including income and excise tax evasion, secret commissions and bribing a foreign public official.

== See also ==
- Crime in Canada
- Corruption by country
- Corruption in the United States
- International Anti-Corruption Academy
- Group of States Against Corruption
- International Anti-Corruption Day
- ISO 37001 Anti-bribery management systems
- United Nations Convention against Corruption
- OECD Anti-Bribery Convention
- Transparency International
