= Open by default =

Open by default, as widely used in the contexts of open government and open data, is a principle in which government makes its data accessible to the public by default, unless there is a sufficient justification to explain that greater public interest may be at stake, as a result of disclosure. Since the principle empowers the public's right to know and capacity to oversee government activities, it is closely associated with government transparency, civic engagement, and e-governance in organizing public life. In many cases, the principle is accompanied with the technological commitment to create "metadata standardization for all datasets, publication of a machine-readable data catalogue or inventory of both released and to-be released datasets ... (and) use of open licenses."

== Definition ==
The International Open Data Charter defines open by default as one of the six key principles that enable society to enjoy the full benefits of open government data. The other five principles are Timely and Comprehensive Data, Accessible and Usable Data, Comparable and Inter-operable Data, Data for Improved Governance and Engagement, and Data for Inclusive Development and Innovation. While each principles share some overlapping backgrounds, they respectively strive to propose different deliverable qualifications for government entities. The qualifications under Open By Default, as proposed by International Open Data Charter, are roughly as follows:

1. Data that are open must be government data and have significant benefit to the public
2. Government data should be made accessible, clearly communicated, and usable without restriction for the public
3. Government should promote the open data practices
4. Disclosure of government data should not infringe citizens' privacy
5. Government develop and adopt policies and practices to ensure all government data is made open; provide clear justifications as to why certain data cannot be released; establish a culture of openness; develop leadership, management, oversight, performance incentives, and internal communication policies necessary" in "all government departments and agencies; observe and update appropriately domestic laws and internationally recognized standards regarding security, privacy confidentiality, and intellectual property; and anonymity data at its disclosure, to remove sensitive, personally-identifiable data get removed in accordance with privacy legislation and standards.

In the meantime, there are other scholars and institutions that advocate for more rigorous standards, such as disclosure of data collection methodologies, and publishing processes, as they provide more contextual information for measuring the quality of data.

== Principles and policies at national governments ==
=== United States ===
In the United States, the early forms of open government data have largely been the weather data released by National Oceanic and Atmospheric Administration, and Global Positioning System released by Air Force Space Command. However, through the continuing amendments to the Freedom of Information Act (FOIA), particularly the Electronic Freedom of Information Act Amendments of 1996, various government transparency advocates were able to press the federal government to disclose more public data online. With the growing advocacy calling for the fundamental shift towards government transparency, a liberal think tank OMB Watch, joined with 100 other advocacy groups to submit open government data recommendations to then President-elect Barack Obama and the United States Congress in 2008. Taking account of these recommendations, the President Barack Obama issued an Open Government Directive to create "unprecedented and sustained level of openness and accountability" in every federal agencies in his first day at the office in 2009. The directive included 120-day deadline for Chief Information Officer Vivek Kundra to implement the open government data portal, with the civic consultations openly submitted through National Archives and Records Administration. As a result, Data.gov was launched in late May 2009. The development of the portal focused on centralizing data-sets widely scattered across different federal agencies, releasing previously unavailable data, and enhancing machine-readability, with civic experts and academic consortium. OECD's 2013 research has acknowledged the efforts of Obama Administration to open government data in "default setting."

Over the years, Data.gov provided one-point access to thousands of public data-sets, which in turn were ranked and refined with increasing civic participation. However these ongoing efforts were thought to have stalled under President Donald Trump's administration, in regards to the fact it has not appointed chief technology officer that should oversee the management of the portal and data quality advocated by civil society. During the transition period, there were active movements among the transparency advocacy groups and researchers to save the public data from the federal websites, in a fear that these data will no longer be open by default. The Open Government Plan documents of National Archives and Records Administration have since moved from its website to GitHub as well.

=== Canada ===
In Canada's case, Open by Default principles were first adopted by municipal and provincial levels of government before they took to national platforms. The City of Edmonton, which began its online cataloging of municipal data in 2010, was the first to adopt the International Open Data Charter in Canada and the United States. In the Provincial Government of British Columbia, Premier Christy Clark issued an Open Government initiavies in 2011. Under the initiatives, Open Data policy was adopted and legislated in 2011, providing free and unrestricted use of more than 1000 datasets in its data catalogue through "proactive disclosure". However, in 2013, Information and Privacy Commissioner for BC, Elizabeth Denham saw there are more provincial data to be disclosed "by default," though the nature of such data were not identified in her report. In the Provincial Government of Ontario, Premier Kathleen Wynne launched the Open Government initiatives in 2013, which publicly appointed a team of public and civic experts on open government across Canada. The report highlighted that Open by Default principles should be integral component of Ontario's open government policy, "Ontario should make openness the norm and secrecy the exception." In 2017, the government of Ontario formally adopted the International Open Data Charter to increase "transparency, accountability, public participation, technology and innovation".

As municipal governments and provincial governments in Canada engaged in Open Government movements, the idea of creating Open Government at the federal level were well under the discussion at parliament committees since 2011. However, it gained wide reception from the public in 2015, when Prime Minister Justin Trudeau and Liberal Party of Canada campaigned on the promise to amend the Access to Information Act and Privacy Act (Bill C-58), to make government data and information open by default. On June 19, 2017, Bill C-58 passed the legislation, but it has been criticized, as under the amendment, the federal government could refuse to disclose government data without proper justification or warning, if information requests were suspected to be "frivolous or vexatious."

=== Italy ===
Italy was one of the firsts to use the term "Open By Default" in its policy framework. Explicitly stated in Decree No. 170 of 2012, the government of Italy required all national agencies to follow the principle in catering public information. More importantly, the decree played a foundational role in incorporating the term "Open By Default" into the explicit policies, which required federal agencies to report justifiable grounds on why they fail to open up relevant data. Italy was also one of the founding signatories of the International Open Data Charter.

=== Other countries ===
- Australia
- Austria
- Argentina
- Chile
- Colombia
- Costa Rica
- France
- Guatemala
- Italy
- Mexico
- Sweden
- Panama
- Paraguay
- Philippines
- Sierra Leone
- South Korea
- Ukraine
- United Kingdom
- Uruguay
- European Union
