= People's Code =

US open source project

The People's Code is an ongoing open source project that aims to make all US Federal agencies and departments utilize open source software, (OSS), for their platforms, at a pilot minimum of 20% open source. In so doing, Federal departments and agencies can be more transparent with the work they do. Software can eventually be streamlined across all agencies, and people can begin to make suggestions on how to improve the code and policy these departments work on. The belief that citizens should have this information available and open to them, is the idea behind what the Obama administration coined as the, People's Code.

== Policy ==
The People's Code is a project informed by the United States Federal Source Code Policy. In August 2016, the People's Code served as a deliverable of President Obama's 2013 promise to enforce open data initiatives, and pursue aspirations for a modernized digital governance for the United States.

== Purpose ==
Employing this OSS model allows for a cost-efficient means of releasing platforms and projects, whereby individual code does not need to be written for each of the respective plans or platforms respective departments are embarking on. This model also enables a system for best practices to be streamlined across participating Federal agencies. This means if one code proves to be successful in a particular department, another department would be able to apply and modify this same code to meet their own specific requirements, until eventually, the best tools and services of practice are implemented across the board.

Previous Open Data action plans to release government data and statistics are said to be complemented through the implementation of this policy plan. This is because this policy plan can promote collaborative exchange between governments, and citizens. Civic engagement and participation could then be increased, and the deliverance of government services can be improved through collective efforts.

== Open Government ==
In addition to economic and service efficiencies, this policy also supports open government objectives by promoting transparency in program and service implementation. Federal agencies, and by extension the government as a whole, increase openness by proactively releasing source code and inviting public engagement.

== Criticisms ==
Some criticisms against this specific point on open governance have been raised. The independent agency of the, General Services Administration has said that Obama's initial plans for a pilot version of this program were insufficient. This agency instead made a suggestion for an initiative which would proactively disclose all code, rather than successfully meet a minimum specified amount. Another criticism against this concept of open government planning was that the release of code and software from specific agencies could have the potential to lead to vulnerabilities for the government, (such as terrorism), as a result of being too transparent. Similarly to this, federal agencies who have contracted their code programming out to third parties do not have to follow the same requirements set out by this policy. This could mean code for certain programs and agencies may never become open source. The subsequent change of government has from President Obama to Trump has led for this policy to be archived on the official White House government website. Activists for OSS have also explained the future of this policy is hard to discern under Trump, who has made orders which stifle the potential for innovations through open source. Open source thrives through collaboration and innovation of diverse communities in America. These communities have had difficulty following more strict immigration restrictions since Trump's presidency, which also threatens the future of open source cooperation, prompting members of this community, like Jim Zemlin, to speak out.

== GitHub ==
In line with Sections 7.2, 7.3 and Section 7.6 of the Federal Source Code Policy, the code.gov site where government data and code is published on OSS platform, GitHub. This site acts a repository for federal code to be examined by citizens who can access these data and see what federal agencies use to run their programs and projects. Citizens and other GitHub users can also use this same forum to send in their policy and code suggestions. These suggestions and flags for bug fixes are then reviewed, and can subsequently be approved on a case-by-case basis prior to implementation.

== Coding Projects ==
There are currently nearly 30 participating Federal agencies, and thousands of individual projects which are employing the OSS model, and emphasizing the concept that their work and these data are the People's Code.
