= Open data index =

An open data index is any set of indicators which assesses and evaluates the general openness of a government's open data portal. Open data indices not only show how open a data portal is, but also encourage citizens and government officials alike, to participate in their local open data communities, particularly in advocating for local open data and local open data policies.

There are two mainstream methodologies, which are Global Open Data Index and Open Data Barometer. The Global Open Data Index evaluates an open data portal from 11 different aspects based on the Open Definition of open data, while the Open Data Barometer adds two more indices compared to the previous one.

== Scoring standard ==
According to the service offered by Open Knowledge International, they run a measurement called "Global Open Data Index" which is "an annual effort to measure the state of open government data around the world". And they evaluate the openness of an open dataset according to the following questions:

1. Does the data exist? (5 marks)

The Open Knowledge Foundation specifically indicates that the data of an open data portal should be directly comes from the official government department or a third party with the permission of the government that they can fully represent the government. And if so, the third party should explicitly states the permission.

2. Is data in digital form? (5 marks)

This question does not examines if the data can be accessed online or by public but if the data exists in any digital format.

3. Publicly available? (5 marks)

A data could be considered as publicly available when it can be accessed without any permission or password by every individual (not just government officers) and there is no restrictions for the amount of photocopies can be made if the data is in the paper form. For this question, it does not matter if the data is in paper form or digital form.

4. Is the data available for free? (15 marks)

The data is available for free if the access of the data does not require any forms of charges.

5. Is the data available online? (5 marks)

The data is available online if it can be accessed through the Internet from an official source.

6. Is the data machine-readable? (15 marks)

This question addresses whether the data is in a form that can be easily processed by the computer. File types such as XLS, CSV, JSON, XML are considered as machine-readable, while PDF, or HTML are not.

7. Available in bulk? (10 marks)

If the whole dataset can be easily downloaded, it can be considered as available in bulk.

8. Openly licensed? (30 marks)

This question addresses whether the data can be freely used, reused, and redistributed by everyone without any restrictions. A list of types of licenses that meet the requirements is listed at http://opendefinition.org/licenses/.

9. Is the data provided on a timely and up to date basis? (10 marks)

This question examines if the data is updated on a regular basis. It requires personal judgement with rationale.

Each of these questions evaluates different aspects of a dataset, and each question is weighted differently based on the importance. There is in total 13 types of datasets. The final score is calculated according to following equation: sum of all datasets scores/1300 ( (the maximum possible score that a country can get) - sum (13 dataset)/1300 = index percentage. The Global Open Data Index ranks each country according to their percentage of openness.

In addition, the Open Data Barometer adds two more question for their evaluation of the open data portal, and they are:

10. Is the publication of the dataset sustainable?

11. Are (linked) data URIs provided for key elements of the data?

== See also ==
- Open data
- Organisation for Economic Co-operation and Development
