= Open data portal =

An open data portal is any online platform which supports users in accessing collections of open data. Typical open data portals present the data of the organization which hosts the portal.

Government organizations sometimes host open data portals as a way of meeting their regional freedom of information legal requirements. Another common use case is open data portals for sharing data in some field of research for the benefit of other researchers.

== Characteristics ==
The simplest open data portal is list of datasets with instructions for how anyone can access and use that data.

Characteristics of good open data portals include the use of open standards, access to data without human intervention, and analytics about what data people use.

Open data portals contain information of interest to citizens, business owners, nonprofit administrators, researchers, and journalists.

== Uses ==
=== Government ===
A 2012 paper reported that government organizations which set up open data portals often find it challenging to predict what sorts of users will want the data and how they will use it.

In the European Union there is a central open data portal which connects anyone to the regional and subject specific data portals for various matters of government.

In the United States all the states and many cities offer open data portals.

A report on the open data portal emphasized the need to develop the culture of appreciation of open data.

A review of open data portals in Australia found variation in what the portals offered and how they operated.

=== Science ===
There is a cancer genomics open data portal.

There is a portal for systems chemistry biology.

== See also ==
- UK Power Networks Open Data Portal
- Open.data.gov.sa
