= Africa Open Data Conference =

Biennial conference

The Africa Open Data Conference is a biennial conference that convenes governments agencies, individuals and organizations with interest in creating and releasing public data sets for easy access and use by ordinary citizens in Africa to share advances in open data and form new collaborations.

== Overview ==
Conference	Date	Location
Africa Open Data Conference 2015	2015	Dar es Salaam, Tanzania
Africa Open Data Conference 2017	July 17–21	Accra, Ghana
