= Indigenous statistics =

Indigenous statistics is a quantitative research method specific to Indigenous people. It can be better understood as an Indigenous quantitative methodology. Indigenous quantitative methodologies include practices, processes, and research that are done through an Indigenous lens.

The purpose of indigenous statistics is to diminish the disparities and inequalities faced by Indigenous people globally. Statistics are a reliable source of data, which can be used in the present and future. This is a relatively new concept in the research world. Statistics are the collection of quantitative data that is used to interpret and present data. Indigenous refers to an ethnic group of people who are the earliest inhabitants or native to that land. Connecting these two terms, researchers aim to provide fair and reliable data on Indigenous communities. By focusing on three central themes, which are situated in entering research through a solely Indigenous lens. the cultural framework of data, quantitative methodologies in data, and the situated activity amongst academic research.

== Background ==
=== Statistics ===
Statistics are a collection of quantitative data. Statistics are how data is interpreted and presented. Statistics interpret our reality and influence the understanding of societies. The purpose of Indigenous statistics is to have Indigenous people collect their own data in a fashion they find best suitable for their community. This is done by Indigenous researchers, or through the perspective of Indigenous communities. Statistics, in turn, provide information used to determine theoretical and practical development and produce the notion of open data. Indigenous statistics aims to make statistics a source of reliable information regarding Indigenous societies.

=== Indigenous people ===
Indigenous Peoples is a term used to define people with ancestral origins in the land they inhabit. Indigenous peoples are the earliest known inhabitants of the land they inhabit.

== Concerns with open data ==
Open data is making statistics available to the public. The data should be easily accessible, and this is often done through a web portal. Scholars have criticized the way open data is collected today. For instance, some have said that open data is not politically or economically benign. Others have made critiques regarding elements of open data that are not as honest as they first appear, thereby affecting certain people differently. The key concern is whether or not these initiatives bring forth value, impact, transparency, participation and foster economic development. Many of the critiques of open data are not to abandon the movement but to find more sustainable ways that are equitable and transparent for all. For example, open data has not always been the fairest to Indigenous populations. Open data may lead to data being used to perform misleading and prejudicial work or put non-Indigenous services managing Indigenous relations that misrepresent them due to cultural assumptions. Indigenous people are also not accounted for in state datasets. They are restrained from informing their impacts and are not able to rely on this data for solutions. Indigenous statistics, push to remove these barriers and minimize the risk of misrepresentation and misinformation being published on indigenous people.

== Theoretical framework ==
Indigenous statistics is a relatively new concept, recently gaining attraction in the research world. It aims to decolonize the data and provide fair statistics to Indigenous communities. Indigenous statistics critique the production of open data and conclusions being drawn from open data statistics. Indigenous Statistics is the first book to be published on quantitative Indigenous methodologies. It was written by authors Maggie Walter and Chris Andersen. It was published on September 15, 2013, by Routledge Taylor & Francis Group. Indigenous Statistics offer a new lens in researching statistics, by critiquing the ways in which quantitative data have framed Indigenous people, and offers new forms of quantitative data to better represent the Indigenous populations. The authors focus on three main topics. They first investigate the cultural framework of Indigenous statistics, how methodologies, not methods produce Indigenous statistics and how academic research is a situated activity.

=== Cultural framework ===
The cultural framework within Indigenous statistics is one that focuses on the collection, analysis, and interpretation of statistics about Indigenous people. Indigenous scholars claim that the representation of Indigenous people in statistics actually is a representation that reflects the dominant nation-state rather than the subjects being analyzed. The objective here is to focus on the ways in which statistics produced by the nation-state may push and drive certain narratives about Indigenous people that may not be a true representation. Indigenous statistics call for their own empowerment and control to produce and collect data according to their societies' own needs. Approaching research through an Indigenous lens, is not one of the strict or clear-cut guidelines. Taking an Indigenous research approach will look different based on the need of the research. An initiative that took an Indigenous approach when conducting the cultural framework of their research is, The Te Atawhai o Te Ao Institute, which is based in Whanganui, New Zealand. This institute is dedicated to Indigenous based research that will generate and rediscover knowledge focused on health and the environment for the benefit of Indigenous people.

=== Indigenous quantitative methodology ===
Indigenous quantitative methodologies are methodologies in which the practices and processes are taken from an Indigenous standpoint. This means that all aspects of the research and methodologies are influenced by an Indigenous lens.

Standpoints influenced by an Indigenous lens; Indigenous Social Position, Indigenous Epistemology, Indigenous Ontology, Indigenous Axiology.

The methodologies of collection, interpretation, and analysis produce statistics rather than the research method itself. The focus is on the motives and reasoning behind certain research, more than what type of research is being conducted to find the information. Methodology is a central understanding of Indigenous statistics as it helps provide context for many steps of the research. Methodologies help determine why and how research questions are asked instead of other questions. How, when, and where the data was collected and how the data was interpreted and used. Methodologies are important because they provide the user with insights from how the data was collected and governance over it, to the personal identity of the researcher and understanding of their objectives.

One way the census' can further improve on methodologies on Indigenous statistics is through Statistics Canada's "ethnic mobility" category. Canada recognizes Indigenous people into three categories, First Nations, Metis, and Inuit. These categories today are meant to be inclusive diverse representations of all Indigenous people, yet is the categories the Canadian government attempt to govern the diversity of Indigenous people, rather than reflecting the actual diversity amongst these communities. For example, the term First Nation captures the image of dozens of different tribal societies sharing some similarities, but the Canadian Government recognizes them as one people entirely.

=== Academic research ===
Indigenous statistics' sole purpose is to provide equitable and transparent data on Indigenous people that is fair and honest to them. The focus on Academic research being a situated activity, is to draw attention to how research may mislead or misrepresent the statistics being presented. Academic research either helps push the truth out or as in the past, be used to push specific narratives. Throughout history, there have been institutions that recorded and published qualitative data. Academic research is situated within the dominant society of their nation-state, and the development of Indigenous statistics into the research world, looks to remove these systemic barriers and begin finding more equitable and fairways of conducting and publishing research on Indigenous groups.
