= Saudi Open Data Platform =

Government digital portal in Saudi Arabia

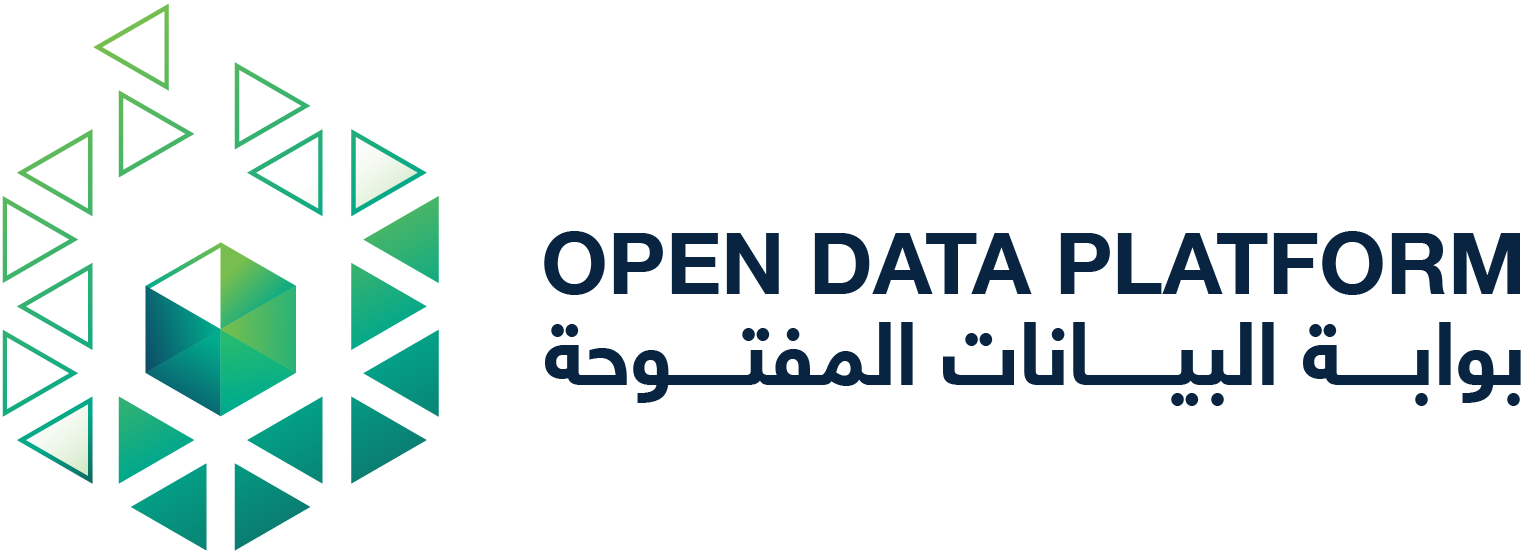
- Available in: Arabic and English
- Country of origin: Saudi Arabia
- Owner: KSA Government
- Industry: government data
- Website: https://open.data.gov.sa
- Commercial: no
- Registration: optional

The Saudi Open Data Platform (Arabic: البوابة الوطنية للبيانات المفتوحة, National Open Data Portal) is a centralized digital portal established in 2019 by the Saudi Data and Artificial Intelligence Authority (SDAIA). It provides public access to datasets released by various government entities in standardized, reusable formats. The platform is intended to improve data transparency and accessibility, supporting research, analysis, and digital services development.

As of June 2025 the platform hosted over 11,439 datasets from 289 organizations, with total downloads exceeding 284,800. It serves as a central repository, allowing users to browse and download government data for a range of purposes.

== History and background ==
The platform is part of Saudi Arabia's broader initiative on open government data, which began with the introduction of policies promoting the release of high-value datasets. The first version of the Saudi Open Data Platform was launched in 2019. A redesigned version was introduced in 2023 under the domain open.data.gov.sa, with SDAIA taking over governance responsibilities. SDAIA is tasked with ensuring dataset availability, data quality, and compliance with national policies.

In 2024 SDAIA integrated 320 government systems into the National Data Lake, gathering over 100TB of data from 60+ entities. The Open Data Platform hosted over 8,700 datasets from more than 230 organizations.

In 2025 the KSA represented by SDAIA, achieved first place globally in the Open Government Data Index (OGDI).

== Datasets ==
As of 2025 the platform hosted over 11,439 datasets, and provides access to a wide range of datasets published by government entities in Saudi Arabia. These datasets span multiple sectors, including health, economy, education, environment, labor, and public administration. Each dataset is accompanied by metadata that typically includes the dataset title, description, source organization, date of publication, and format. The platform supports machine-readable formats such as CSV, JSON, and XML to facilitate data reuse. Users can search, filter, and download datasets without the need for registration. Additionally, many datasets are accessible via application programming interfaces (APIs), allowing integration with external systems and applications. The platform aims to support transparency, data-driven decision-making, and research by providing centralized access to public sector information.

== Open data license ==
The datasets provided on the Saudi Open Data Platform are covered under the Open Data Commons Attribution License, which permits use, modification, and sharing, provided attribution to the original source is maintained. This license may apply differently depending on the dataset type (e.g., multimedia content).

== Data governance ==
The platform follows a structured data governance model. Public users can access and download datasets without registration. However, registration is required to interact through features such as commenting, rating, or requesting data not yet published. Support services and APIs are available for technical users to facilitate integration of data into applications.

== Features ==
The platform provides access to datasets without requiring user registration. It includes features such as browsing tools, download options, API access, geographic information system (GIS) maps, and informational sections related to user submitted stories, events, and updates. Organizations with administrative access can manage their profiles and datasets directly through the platform.

== Use cases and international context ==
The Saudi Open Data Platform supports machine readable formats and open APIs, which align with international standards and practices in open data sharing. This allows for the integration of data into cross-border research and development efforts, and supports alignment with broader international development objectives.

== Policy ==
Saudi Arabia's open data policy is structured around several core principles:

1. Open by Default – Data is made publicly available unless restricted for legal or privacy reasons.
2. Open Format and Machine-Readable – Datasets must be accessible in common formats (e.g., CSV, XLS, JSON, XML).
3. Up to Date – Data should be current and published in a timely fashion.
4. Comprehensive – Metadata and privacy compliance are required.
5. Non-discriminatory Access – Public access does not require identification or registration.
6. Free of Charge – Datasets are provided at no cost.
7. Licensing – Clear terms of use must be defined.
8. Governance and Engagement – Policies encourage transparency and public input.
9. Inclusive Innovation – Government entities are encouraged to support data reuse in various sectors.

== See also ==
- GOV.UK
- Data.gov (Open data from the national government of the US)
- Data.gov.uk (Open data from the national government of the United Kingdom)
- Data.gov
- MyGov.in
- e-Government
- e-participation
- GeoBase (geospatial data)
- Open access in Canada
- Open politics
- Open source governance
- Toronto Open Data
