= Corruption in Côte d'Ivoire =

Corruption in Côte d'Ivoire remains a critical problem and it is one of the issues that undermine Côte d'Ivoire's economic development. Corruption is particularly pervasive in the public sector and includes bribery, embezzlement, and nepotism. Measures have been adopted to address it but challenges persist.

== Forms of corruption ==
Corruption is present in different agencies of Côte d'Ivoire’s government such as the customs, judiciary, and land administration departments. It is particularly notable in the public procurement processes and manifests in several forms such as bribery, embezzlement, extortion, and nepotism.

=== Public procurement ===
Corruption in Côte d'Ivoire's public procurement system is facilitated by a lack of transparency and weak oversight, leading to frequent instances of bid-rigging, favoritism in awarding contracts, and inflated contracts. Limited access to government information means that data on these corrupt practices often relies on reports from non-governmental organizations, such as Social Justice, which has documented cases and their impact on vulnerable sectors like real estate and agriculture. This problem is further aggravated by the country’s unclear legal framework, which leads to an inability to follow the procurement regulations.

In 2018, an infrastructure corruption scandal exposed fraudulent road construction contracts, revealing that projects were awarded to companies with inflated bids. A similar pattern emerged in the telecommunications sector the following year, with overpriced contracts going to firms closely connected to government officials. The funds obtained through these contracts are often siphoned off through money laundering.

=== High-level corruption ===
By 2018, the prosecutor’s office has reported cases of corruption being investigated and these include former general directors, elected representatives, and financial directors. The judiciary is also susceptible to corruption. Despite the constitutional guarantee for the independence of the Ivorian judiciary, it has in practice succumbed to political pressure and corruption induced by external forces. In 2017, Transparency International identified corruption in the judiciary as a major hindrance to doing business in Côte d'Ivoire.

Former ministers such as Guillaume Soro (Transport), Mamadou Sangafowa (Agriculture), Raymonde Goudou Coffie (Health), Kandia Camara (Education) were each implicated in corruption scandals that involve nepotism or the awarding of contracts to unqualified companies they have close ties with, diversion/misappropriation of funds, and mismanagement. Soro, for instance, was accused of embezzling public funds and was prosecuted for multiple corruption charges. Despite the rounds of investigations and prosecutions, there is low conviction rate for those involved in corrupt practices.

Bureaucratic processes are also riddled with corruption. A World Bank survey, for example, revealed that businesses are expected to give a gift in order to obtain an operating license. Similarly, individuals who are obtaining documents such official stamps, birth certificates, and car permits, among others, often entail unofficial payments.

Corruption also exists in the private sector. For example, the cocoa industry – a crucial part of the Ivorian economy – is plagued with allegations of corruption. It includes illicit financial flows, tax evasion, and mismanagement of funds. Cocoa along with other products such as coffee and cashew are bought using cash, which makes it difficult to trace the financial flow to determine financial malfeasance. Another form of embezzlement present in Côte d’Ivoire involves the use of political office to secure and expand private business interests. For example, friends and family members of politicians have obtained redistributed state enterprises. At one point, a sitting president’s family owned the largest coffee and cocoa plantations in the country.

== Anti-corruption measures ==
Côte d’Ivoire has made strides in combatting corruption through a series of initiatives. According to Transparency Justice, the government made inroads through the creation of the High Authority for Good Governance (HABG) in 2013. The agency, which serves as one of the instruments of the government’s anti-corruption reform, was established as an independent entity that has legal authority, financial autonomy and national jurisdiction. Aside from its administrative mandate to contribute in the development of anti-corruption policies, it conducts investigations into corrupt practices and identifies perpetrators to be prosecuted.

Côte d’Ivoire has also pledged to support the activities of HABG with anti-corruption policies and control of public procurement. Such activities include the enactment of laws that prevent and fight corruption as well as the undertaking of a diagnostic study on the structural causes of corruption. Proposed laws include those that seek to prevent conflicts of interest, influence peddling, abuse of position, embezzlement, and theft of public property, extortion, and illegitimate advantages. The country is also a signatory to the African Union’s Convention on Preventing and Combating Corruption.

=== Anti-corruption challenges ===
Two of the major issues that hamper anti-corruption reform in Côte d’Ivoire are: 1) limited resources; and, 2) institutional weaknesses. Anti-corruption agencies often lack sufficient funding and personnel to investigate and prosecute corruption cases effectively. There is also the case of political interference, which hampers the institutional ability to hold powerful individuals accountable. This is highlighted by the influence of political patronage networks that make it difficult for anti-corruption bodies to prosecute perpetrators with political connections.

Cultural factors can also hamper anti-corruption initiatives. For example, there are forms of corruption that are acceptable or even expected in Côte d’Ivoire. These include gift-giving and patronage, cases that underscore the challenge of identifying what are legitimate social practices from what are considered corrupt.

== International rankings ==
In Transparency International's 2025 Corruption Perceptions Index, Côte d'Ivoire scored 43 on a scale from 0 ("highly corrupt") to 100 ("very clean"). When ranked by score, Côte d'Ivoire ranked 76th among the 182 countries in the Index, where the country ranked first is perceived to have the most honest public sector. For comparison with regional scores, the best score among sub-Saharan African countries (Note: Angola, Benin, Botswana, Burkina Faso, Burundi, Cameroon, Cape Verde, Central African Republic, Chad, Comoros, Côte d'Ivoire, Democratic Republic of the Congo, Djibouti, Equatorial Guinea, Eritrea, Eswatini, Ethiopia, Gabon, Gambia, Ghana, Guinea, Guinea-Bissau, Kenya, Lesotho, Liberia, Madagascar, Malawi, Mali, Mauritania, Mauritius, Mozambique, Namibia, Niger, Nigeria, Republic of the Congo, Rwanda, Sao Tome and Principe, Senegal, Seychelles, Sierra Leone, Somalia, South Africa, South Sudan, Sudan, Tanzania, Togo, Uganda, Zambia, and Zimbabwe.) was 68, the average was 32 and the worst was 9. For comparison with worldwide scores, the best score was 89 (ranked 1), the average was 42, and the worst was 9 (ranked 181, in a two-way tie).
