= Data.gov =

American federal open data platform

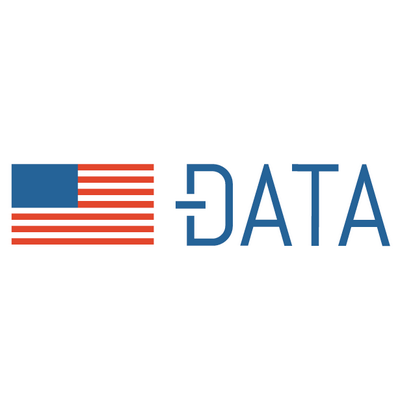
- Website type: Government Web site
- Available in: English
- Owner: Government of the United States
- Website: data.gov
- Commercial: No
- Registration: Optional
- Launched: May 30, 2009; 17 years ago
- Current status: Active

Data.gov is a U.S. government website launched in late May 2009 by the federal chief information officer of the United States, Vivek Kundra. Data.gov aims to improve public access to high value, machine-readable datasets generated by the Executive Branch of the federal government. The site is a repository for federal, state, local, and tribal government information made available to the public.

== History and background ==
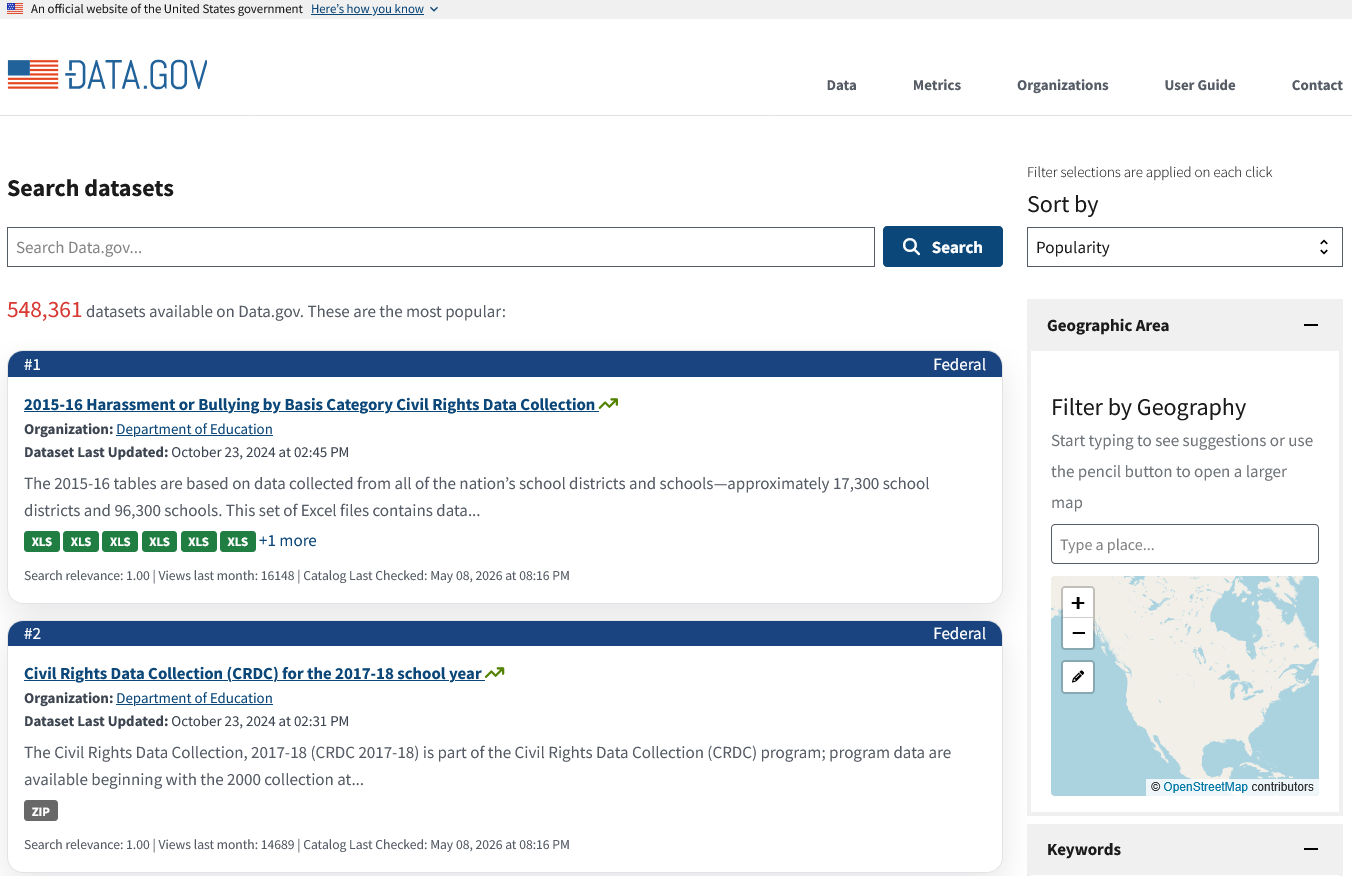
screenshot of catalog, May 2026

On March 5, 2009, shortly after his appointment as the first federal chief information officer, Vivek Kundra announced the creation of Data.gov. The website is managed and hosted by the U.S. General Services Administration, Technology Transformation Services.

The site introduced the philosophy of digital open data to the U.S. Federal government, an approach which according to the book Democratizing Data will have benefits for states including "rebuilding confidence in government and business".

Data.gov has grown from 47 datasets at launch to over 370,000 datasets. Jeanne Holm, Chief Knowledge Architect for the National Aeronautics and Space Administration (NASA), was the Evangelist and knowledge architect for Data.gov, James Hendler, an artificial intelligence researcher at Rensselaer Polytechnic Institute, was at the time named the "Internet Web Expert" and tasked with helping Data.gov exploit advanced Web technologies.

Data.gov was one of the first efforts to create an open data ecosystem—using data as the basis for connecting government agencies, researchers, businesses, and civil society. Communities of practice were created around key topics such as climate, providing a way for researchers to ask for data and to coordinate work across government agencies. By the end of 2010, most Federal agencies had published data on Data.gov. In November 2010, the Data.gov team hosted the first International Open Government Data Conference with 10 nations participating to expand the principles of open data. This conference grew to become the International Open Data Conference.

By 2012, open data from Data.gov was regularly used by civil society and business. Community led efforts like hackathons from Code for America and events such as the National Day of Civic Hacking, relied on government data provided by Data.gov. The Gov Lab created the Open Data 500 to showcase businesses built on open data provided by Data.gov. To ensure open data's sustainability, President Obama created an executive order on "Making Open and Machine Readable the New Default for Government Information" to formalize Data.gov as the permanent repository for open government data.

McKinsey & Company published research showing that open data contributed $3 trillion to the U.S. economy. Two of the biggest datasets for economic impact have been global positioning satellite data from the U.S. Space Force and weather data from the National Weather Service. By 2014, all 175 Federal agencies and 77 other organizations had published data on the site, in both human understandable and machine-readable formats and with open APIs.

On January 14, 2019, the OPEN Government Data Act, as part of the Foundations for Evidence Based Policymaking Act, became law. The OPEN Government Data Act makes Data.gov a requirement in statute, rather than a policy. It requires federal agencies to publish their information online as open data, using standardized, machine-readable data formats, with their metadata included in the Data.gov catalog. Data.gov is working with an expanded group of federal agencies to include their datasets in Data.gov as they implement the new law.

=== Open Government Directive ===
The U.S. Open Government Directive of December 8, 2009, required that all agencies post at least three high-value data sets online and register them on Data.gov within 45 days.

=== OPEN Government Data Act ===
The Foundations for Evidence-Based Policymaking Act of 2018 (“Evidence Act”) signed into law on January 14, 2019, emphasizes collaboration and coordination to advance data and evidence-building functions in the Federal Government by statutorily mandating Federal evidence-building activities, open government data, and confidential information protection and statistical efficiency.

Title II of the Foundations for Evidence Based Policymaking Act, the OPEN Government Data Act, requires additional agencies to comply with the statute by providing access to free, open, and machine readable data.

Additionally, the Office of Management and Budget is required to collaborate with the Office of Government Information Services and the Administrator of General Services to develop and maintain an online repository of tools, best practices, and schema standards to facilitate the adoption of open data practices across the Federal Government.

=== Data removal ===
In January 2025, following the inauguration of Donald Trump as the 47th President, more than 2,000 datasets were removed from the website.

== See also ==
- ClinicalTrials.gov
- Science.gov
- Government 2.0
- Open Government Initiative
- data.gov.uk
- data.gov.in
- CKAN
- Open data in the United States
