= Open data in Canada =

Open data in Canada describes the capacity for the Canadian Federal Government and other levels of government in Canada to provide online access to data collected and created by governments in a standards-compliant Web 2.0 way. Open data requires that machine-readable should be made openly available, simple to access, and convenient to reuse. As of 2016, Canada was ranked 2nd in the world for publishing open data by the World Wide Web Foundation's Open Data Barometer.

A number of efforts have been made to expose data gathered by Canadian governments of all levels in ways that make it available for mashups.

== List of Sites ==
See open.canada.ca - Open Government Across Canada.

== Federal ==
In early 2010, Canada concluded ten open data principles based on the Sebastopol list, the result of the discussion of 30 open government advocates in Sebastopol, California, in 2007. The ten principles serve as the criteria of evaluating openness and accessibility of government data.

Canada's President of the Treasury Board is the lead on Canadian open government and open data at the federal level.

On March 17, 2011, Stockwell Day, then president, announced the launch of the 12-month pilot period for Canada's national open data site. On April 11, 2012, Tony Clement, who had become president since, announced Canada's Action Plan on Open Government, a three-year plan for open data including:

- expansion of the number of datasets made available, gathering requirements for the next generation platform, in the first year; and
- design and implementation of the new data.gc.ca portal, improving the level of standardization of data, in the second and third years.

On June 18, 2013, an updated version of the portal was launched, along with an updated Open Government licence.

In addition to the main portal site, other Federal department sites include:

- GeoGratis from Natural Resources Canada - "Geospatial data available online at no cost and without restrictions"
- data from Environment Canada

On October 9, 2014, the government issued the Directive on Open Government, an "open by default" directive for government publications and data.

On November 6, 2014, the government announced the 2nd Action Plan on Open Government, including the following open data commitments:

- Open Data Canada
- Canadian Open Data Exchange (ODX)
- Open Data for Development (OD4D)
- Open Data Core Commitment

On July 15, 2016, the government released their third action plan, titled the Third Biennial Plan to the Open Government Partnership, which continued the commitments on Open Data Canada, the Open Data Core Commitment and the Open Data Exchange. It added commitments to increase the availability and usability of geospatial data and release more budgetary, spending and financial data and information.

On March 12, 2018, the government adopted the Open Data Charter.

In 2018, the government published the fourth action plan which was built on the foundation of the first three biennial plans. This plan made ten announcements, many of which are associated to open data including: user-friendly open government, corporate transparency, open science, access to information, reconciliation and open government and open government community. This plan is aimed at continuing the Canadian government's openness, transparency and accountability. These ten announcements are:

- User-friendly open government
- Financial transparency and accountability
- Corporate transparency
- Digital government and services
- Open science
- Healthy democracy
- Access to information
- Feminist and inclusive dialogue
- Reconciliation and open government
- Open government community

Announced in 2023, Statistics Canada recently embarked upon an exploratory initiative which aims to enhance the use and harmonization of open building data from government sources, for the purpose of contributing to the creation of a complete, comprehensive and open database of buildings in Canada.

== Multi-jurisdictional ==
- Federal open government portal provides data search across jurisdictions.
- GeoConnections Discovery Portal - "Enabling discovery and access of Canada's geographical information on the Internet"
- Community Accounts covers Newfoundland only - "providing users at all levels with a reliable source of community, regional, and provincial data" - but the Senate has endorsed making it Canada-wide.

== Provincial ==
There are 8 Provinces and 1 Territory with open data in Canada as of March 2019: Alberta, British Columbia, Ontario, Prince Edward Island, Newfoundland & Labrador, Northwest Territories, Nova Scotia, Québec, and Yukon.

=== Alberta ===
On May 28, 2013, the Province of Alberta launched the Alberta Open Data Portal with approximately 244 datasets. In August 2015 a new portal open.alberta.ca was released to the public, adding further content to the datasets including Government of Alberta publications, a blog, descriptions of how both datasets and publications are chosen and published on the portal. As of October 2017, there are 2361 datasets available to the public, including datasets connected to GeoDiscover Alberta.

=== British Columbia ===
On July 19, 2011, the Province of British Columbia launched DataBC, Canada's second provincial open data site. It contains data across a broad spectrum of subjects, access to tools to analyze the data, and a blog featuring data-related posts. Previously the site had been used just to host environmental data as part of the Apps 4 Climate Action contest, Canada's first app development contest. John Anzin was the grand prize winner as the designer of the best Web App in the Apps4Climate Action Apps contest held on September 16, 2010, at the Vancouver Aquarium, and attended by the Honourable John Yap, Minister of State for Climate Action. The winning App created by John Anzin is named VELO. VELO is a web app for businesses that encourages GHG emissions reduction through measurement and benchmarking internally and against peers. The app allows users to create visuals of an organization's emissions by numerous parameters, e.g. geography, branch, division, year, etc. Businesses would have the potential to change their practices, which can have far-reaching effects.

The Open Data Catalogue is supported by CKAN open source software which the BC government played an important role in the development.

=== Ontario ===
The efforts of Ontario to build a transparent and accessible government can date back to 1988 when Ontario established Freedom of Information and Protection of Privacy Act giving public the access to government records.

In 2011, Ontario's minister of research and innovation, Glen Murray announced on Twitter that the province had an open data project "being built over the next few months”. Minister Murray indicated "the project is fully funded through MaRS - it is being built over the next few months".

As of November 8, 2012, the Province of Ontario has an open data portal. It launched with 63 files.

As of November 7, 2018, Open Data of Ontario listed 2655 data sets and more than 700 of which are accessible. Ontario has specific requirements for government data, Open Data Directive which require that unless due to legal, privacy, security, confidentiality or commercially sensitive reason factors all data are open to public on the Ontario Data Catalogue. Ontario also let public to vote for what data should be made public, and they are working on making the top 25 datasets available online.

=== Quebec ===
The Gautrin Report (Rapport Gautrin, "Gouverner ensemble : Comment le Web 2.0 améliorera-t-il les services aux citoyens?") released May 2, 2012, announced many open government initiatives, including an open data portal.

The open data portal went live June 28, 2012.

=== Nova Scotia ===
In 2017 the Premier of Nova Scotia, Steven McNeil, announced that the province would join the open data movement across the country by creating a data portal, data.novascotia.ca. Data sets hosted on the portal focus on topics such as business and economy, communities and social services, government administration, nature and environment. To encourage the use of open data, the province's Open Data team partnered with Dalhousie University in Halifax, NS to offer an event where students used the public data sets in a contest to create data products.

=== Newfoundland and Labrador ===
In 2016 the Province of Newfoundland and Labrador joined the open data movement with the launch of their open data portal: https://opendata.gov.nl.ca/public/opendata/page/?page-id=home

=== Prince Edward Island ===
The government of PEI is dedicated to proving data in open format with easy and reliable access, and started its open data portal in 2018. PEI publishes data in different formats: CSV, JSON, XML, Geo formats and shapefiles. The open government portal of PEI is https://data.princeedwardisland.ca/.

=== Yukon ===
The goal of creating an open data repository for the government of Yukon was contained in the mandate letter of January 6, 2017 issued to Richard Mostyn, Minister of Highways and Public Works and Minister responsible for the Public Service Commission. The mandate letter directed the Minister to develop an open data repository in support of economic diversification in the innovation, science, and IT sectors, and to increase the amount of information available to citizens. The open data portal for Yukon is at https://open.yukon.ca/data/.

== Municipal ==
While national and provincial level government is where attention is usually focused, equally important innovations in public sector open data initiatives can be found at the local government level. A 2014 survey found more than thirty Canadian municipalities had undertaken open data strategies, and the number of municipalities adopting open data policies and releasing open data has been steadily increasing over the past decade. As of June 2020, there are 62 municipalities that have open data portals in Canada. In an effort to increase the utilization of municipal open data, cities across Canada such as Edmonton and Ottawa have created various contests and hackathons for building apps that use municipal open data.

== Background ==
NOTE: Open data in Canada dates back to the 1970s with the sharing of satellite imagery, the Data Liberation Initiative in the early 1990s, Geogratis and Geobase at the turn of the millennia, the Information Commissioner's call for Open Government, and any number of other civil society actions and events. The following is a partial and recent history/background by politicians.

The governing party in the 40th Canadian Parliament was the Conservative Party of Canada. The consultation paper for the government's Digital Economy Strategy, released May 10, 2010, included the statement that "Governments can help by making publicly-funded research data more readily available to Canadian researchers and businesses".

On September 1, 2010, Canada's Access to Information and Privacy Commissioners issued an Open Government Resolution, but this does not have the force of law. They called for governments at all levels across Canada to endorse open government, and for them to proactively disclose information in open formats (i.e. open data).

On October 18, 2010 Charlie Angus, an NDP MP, introduced a Private Members' Motion M-587 who primary purpose was to support the use of open source in the government, but which also called for "open access to government information".

On October 21, 2010, the Liberal Party of Canada released a party platform document, the Liberal Open Government Initiative. It included a commitment to create a national open data site opendata.gc.ca / donneesouvertes.gc.ca on which to "make as many government datasets as possible available".

On October 25, 2010, Green Party blogger Emma Jane Hogbin raised the issue of open data and on November 25, 2010, the Green Party called for a Federal Open Data Policy.

The House of Commons Standing Committee on Access to Information, Privacy and Ethics (ETHI), 40th Parliament, 3rd Session was conducting a study of Open Government. Recorded audio (Windows Media format) and minutes of their meetings are available.

In October 2018, Canada started its one-year co-chairship of the Open Government Partnership, a collaborative organization supporting open government progress worldwide. The three leadership priorities are inclusion, participation and impact. As the co-chair, the 2019 Open Government Partnership Global Summit will be hosted in Ottawa in May 2019.

== Information and advocacy ==
- The CivicAccess.ca List is where the CivicAccess.ca network discusses how levels of government can and should make civic information and data accessible at no cost in open formats to their citizens. A similar network with a focus on British Columbia is The Open Data Society of British Columbia.
- datalibre.ca is a blog which believes all levels of Canadian governments should make civic information and data accessible at no cost in open formats to their citizens. Data are collected using Canadian tax-payer funds, and use of those data should not be restricted to those who can afford the exorbitant fees.
- The Lac Carling Congress annually brings together professionals from all three levels of government in Canada with private sector companies. The event focuses on the advancement of electronic delivery of government services in Canada.
- There have been several ChangeCamps across Canada in 2009 and 2010.
- There are several citizen advocacy groups throughout Canada that work with governments and institutions to adopt open data policies:
  - Alberta
    - Edmonton: Change Camp Edmonton
  - British Columbia: Open Data Society of BC
  - Ontario
    - Guelph: OpenGuelph
    - Halton: OpenHalton
    - Hamilton: OpenHamilton
    - London: Open Data London
    - Mississauga: Mississauga Data
    - Ottawa: Open Data Ottawa
    - Waterloo Region: Open Data Waterloo Region
    - Windsor: Open Data Windsor
  - Québec: Québec ouvert
    - Gatineau: Gatineau ouverte
    - Montréal: Montréal Ouvert
    - Québec: Capitale ouverte
  - Saskatchewan: Saskatchewan Open Data

== Criticisms ==
A number of the cities use licences that are arguably not Open Data licences as defined by the U.S.-based Sunlight Foundation, and allow for arbitrary and retroactive banning of use. They also do not have versioning of licences and/or datasets.

== See also ==
- Canadian House of Commons Standing Committee on Access to Information, Privacy and Ethics
- Data.gov (Open data from the national government of the United States)
- Data.gov.uk (Open data from the national government of the United Kingdom)
- USAFacts
- Data.gov
- Mygov.in
- E-democracy
- e-Government
- e-participation
- GeoBase (geospatial data)
- Open access in Canada
- Open politics
- Open source governance
- Toronto Open Data
