= Toronto Open Data =

Toronto Open Data is an open data initiative by the City of Toronto government in Toronto, Ontario, Canada. It provides a "world-wide, royalty-free, non-exclusive licence to use, modify, and distribute the datasets in all current and future media and formats for any lawful purpose" with proper credit. Four principles are "transparency, participation, accountability, and accessibility."

== History ==
Toronto Open Data website was launched at the Toronto Innovation Showcase forum on November 2, 2009. To meet the demand and expectations, and to increase the accessibility, the new Open Data Portal was launched in May 2018. During the migration process, the former portal was still recommended until all datasets were ready on the new portal. On February 25, 2019, Open Data Toronto announced the movement had been completed. Key features of the new Open Data Portal include enhanced accessibility, dataset previews, developer APIs for all open datasets, visualizations, and more.

== Datasets ==
As of March 2016, data provided in the City of Toronto's open data catalogue, includes over 200 data sets such as Festivals and Events, Licensed Child Care Centers, Priority Investment Neighbourhoods, Wellbeing Neighbourhood index and transportation data. The former Open Data Portal stopped being updated on January 15, 2018, with 292 datasets. As of March 2019, 295 datasets are available on the new Open Data Portal, and the portal is being updated continuously.

== Comparable Initiatives ==
Many cities have launched open data initiatives.

== Issues ==
As of 2010, Toronto Open Data required a click-through license for any reuse, which made it unsuitable for producing physical products (such as haptic maps for the blind). Toronto adopted the Pan Canada Open Government licence in August 2013. The new licence clarified much confusion on behalf of users as to attribution and rights to use data.

Other challenges in Toronto Open Data including a lack of staff's support, and stakeholders' opposition.

== Open Data Master Program ==
Toronto's City Council approved Toronto's Open Data Master Plan in January 2018. The plan provides a direction for Toronto's Open Data activities until 2022 and helps the city to take a lead on Open Data. "Co-develop with the public; release datasets that help solve civic issues; explore opportunities to improve City efficiency, and embrace inclusivity" were consistent throughout the plan design. The International Open Data Charter (ODC) guides the Open Data Master Program in four aspects: Foundation (data's accessibility, and quality); Integration (government, resource, team and public); Connection (market, talent, and other communities); and Activation (data use and open data awareness).

== See also ==
- Open Data
- Open Data in Canada
- Open access in Canada
- Open Source Governance
