= International Open Data Charter =

Principles and best practices for the release of governmental open data

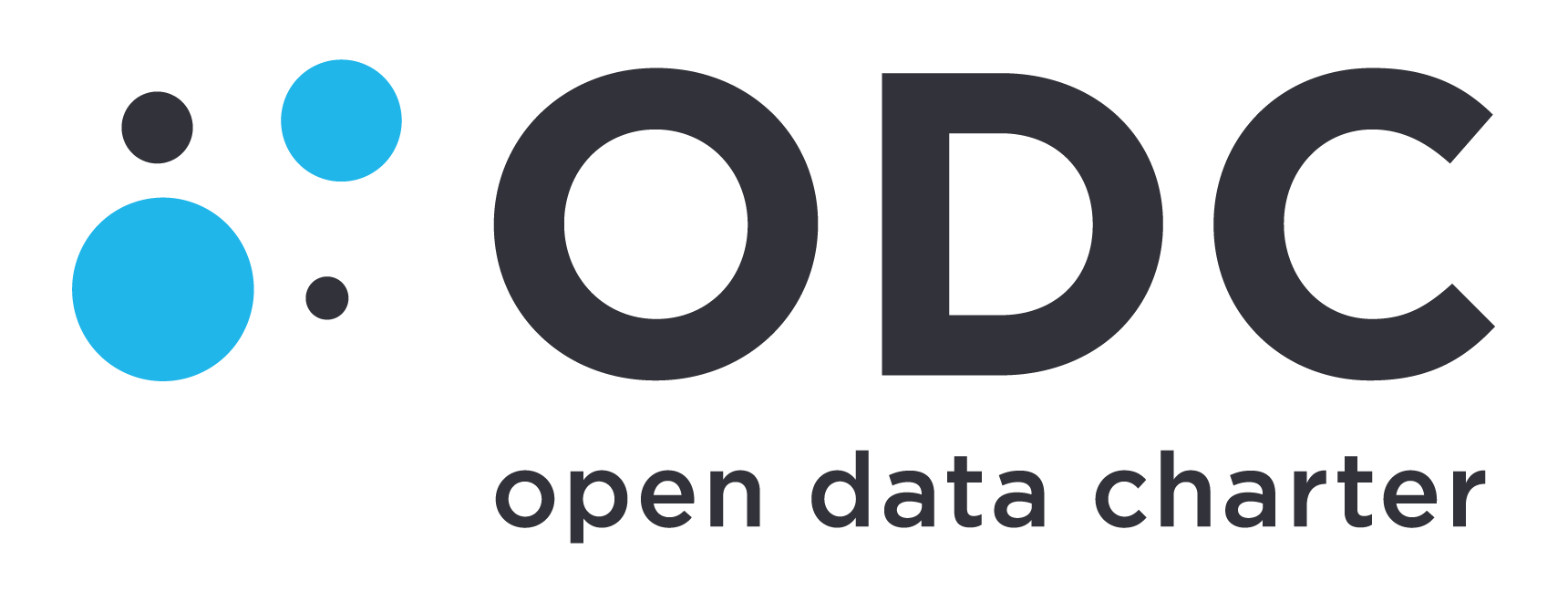
- Abbreviation: ODC
- Formation: October 2015 (10 years ago)
- Type: Set of principles and practices and surrounding organization
- Purpose: Collaboration to promote governmental open data
- Official language: various
- Website: opendatacharter.net
- Remarks: We want a world in which governments collect, share, and use well-governed data, to respond effectively and accountably to our most pressing social, economic, and environmental challenges

The International Open Data Charter is a set of principles and best practices for the release of governmental open data. The charter was formally adopted by seventeen governments of countries, states and cities at the Open Government Partnership Global Summit in Mexico in October 2015. The original signatories included the governments of Chile, Guatemala, France, Italy, Mexico, Philippines, South Korea, the United Kingdom and Uruguay, the cities of Buenos Aires, Minatitlán, Puebla, Veracruz, Montevideo, Reynosa, and the Mexican states of Morelos and Xalapa. As of 2025, 172 national and subnational governments are signatories and the Charter has been endorsed by 81 organisations and non-state actors.

== Principles ==
The charter mandates that data released by governments comply with these principles:

- Open by Default
- Timely and Comprehensive
- Accessible and Usable
- Comparable and Interoperable
- For Improved Governance and Citizen Engagement
- For Inclusive Development and Innovation

== Implementation ==
=== New Zealand ===
New Zealand joined the Open Data Charter in 2017. The charter supports and builds on the New Zealand Declaration on Open and Transparent Government and the Data and Information Management Principles. The goals of New Zealand are to enforce its commitment to open data, ensure it remains internationally aligned, and provide government agencies with a more modern and clear articulation of principles and supporting actions for accelerating the release of open government data.

== See also ==
- Open data
- Open government
