= National Data Sharing and Accessibility Policy =

Indian government policy

The Union Cabinet of India approved the National Data Sharing and Accessibility Policy (NDSAP) on 9 February 2012. The objective of the policy is to facilitate access to Government of India owned shareable data and information in both human readable and machine readable forms.

== Scope ==
A large quantum of data generated using public funds by various organizations and institutions in the country remains inaccessible to the public, although most of such data may be non-sensitive in nature and could be used by public for scientific, economic and developmental purposes. There has been an increasing demand by the community, that such data collected with the deployment of public funds should be made more readily available to all, for enabling rational debate, better decision making and use in meeting civil society needs. The NDSAP policy is designed to promote data sharing and enable access to Government of India owned data for national planning, development and awareness.

The National Data Sharing and Accessibility Policy (NDSAP) is applicable to all shareable non-sensitive data available either in digital or analog forms but generated using public funds by various ministries, departments, subordinate offices, organizations, and agencies of Government of India as well as of the states. The objective of this policy is to facilitate access to Government of India owned shareable data through a wide area network, thereby permitting a wider accessibility and usage by public. The principles on which data sharing and accessibility need to be based include: openness, flexibility, transparency, quality, security and efficiency,.

The motivation behind this policy is United Nations Rio Declaration on Environment and Development, Principle 10: "Environmental issues are best handled with the participation of all concerned citizens, at the relevant level. At the national level, each individual shall have appropriate access to information concerning the environment that is held by public authorities,...and the opportunity to participate in decision-making processes. States shall facilitate and encourage public awareness and participation by making information widely available." and Right to Information Act, 2005, Section 4 (2): "It shall be a constant endeavour of every public authority to take steps in accordance with the requirements of clause (b) of sub-section (1) to provide as much information suo motu to the public at regular intervals through various means of communications, including internet, so that the public have minimum resort to the use of this Act to obtain information.". Some state governments such as Sikkim, Madhya Pradesh, Telangana, Odisha, Assam, etc. have created their own policy on the lines of NDSAP.

== Open Government Data (OGD) Platform India ==
The open government data initiative started in India with the notification of the National Data Sharing and Accessibility Policy (NDSAP), submitted to the Union Cabinet by the Department of Science and Technology, on 17 March 2012. The NDSAP identified the Department of Electronics & Information Technology as the nodal department for the implementation of the policy through National Informatics Centre, while the Department of Science and Technology continues to be the nodal department on policy matters. In pursuance of the Policy, the Open Government Data Platform India was launched in 2012.

"OGD Platform India" is a platform for supporting open data initiative of Government of India. The platform has been set up to provide collated access to resources (datasets/apps) under catalogs, published by different government entities in open format. The portal is intended to be used by Government of India ministries, departments and their organizations to publish datasets, documents, services, tools and applications collected by them for public use. The base "Open Government Data Platform India" is a joint initiative of Government of India and Federal government of the United States.

The current version launched on 11 December 2014 is the stable release of the platform. After the launch of the Digital India program in 2015, "Open Government Data Platform India" has been included as one of the important initiatives under Pillar 6 – "Information for All".

== Government Open Data License – India ==
While appropriate open formats and related aspects for implementation of the policy has been defined in the "NDSAP implementation guidelines" prepared by an inter-ministerial task force constituted by the National Informatics Centre, the open license for data sets published under NDSAP and through the OGD Platform remained unspecified. The license Government Open Data License – India is published as an "Extraordinary Gazette" in February 2017. The license ensures that the data released are not misused or misinterpreted, and that all users have the same and permanent right to use the data.

Government Open Data License – India (GODL-India) is applicable to "all shareable non-sensitive data available either in digital or analog forms but generated using public funds by various agencies of the Government of India". The license permits anyone to "use, adapt, publish (either in original, or in adapted and/or derivative forms), translate, display, add value, and create derivative works (including products and services), for all lawful commercial and non-commercial purposes". In return, the user must acknowledge the provider, source, and license of data by explicitly publishing the attribution statement, including the DOI (Digital object identifier), or the URL (Uniform Resource Locator), or the URI (Uniform Resource Identifier) of the data concerned.

The license does not cover the following kinds of data: a. personal information; b. data that is non-shareable and/or sensitive; c. names, crests, logos and other official symbols of the data provider(s); d. data subject to other intellectual property rights, including patents, trade-marks and official marks; e. military insignia; f. identity documents; and g. any data that should not have been publicly disclosed for the grounds provided under section 8 of the Right to Information Act, 2005.

== See also ==
- Copyright law of India
- Right to Information Act, 2005
- Rio Declaration on Environment and Development
- Open data
- Copyright status of work by the U.S. government
- Crown copyright
- Open Government Licence
