= OGPL =

India–US joint government data project

OGPL (The Open Government Platform) is a joint product from India and the United States to promote government transparency and greater citizen engagement by making more government data, documents, tools and processes publicly available. OGPL will be available as an open source platform. The OGPL combines and expands features of the India's "India.gov.in" and the U.S. "Data.gov" sites. By making this available in useful machine-readable formats it allows developers, analysts, media and academia to develop new applications and insights that will help give citizens more information for better informed decisions.

== Chair ==
This initiative has been chaired on the Indian side by Sam Pitroda, Adviser to Prime Minister on Public Information Infrastructure and Innovations and on the US side by Aneesh Chopra, former Chief Technology Officer to President Obama.

== Features of OGPL ==
Initially, OGPL will provide governments the ability to

- Publish government data, documents, apps, tools, and services from multiple departments within a government.
- Utilize web 2.0 open-source technologies to develop low-cost, cloud-based infrastructure.
- Engage citizens with open data based applications and services to improve their lives.
- Create data-rich community spaces around topics of national priorities and international interest.
- Empower end-users to share data via social media platforms such as Facebook, LinkedIn and Twitter.
- In the future, provide publicly available application programming interfaces (APIs) and other tools to add external software modules for data visualization, wizards, and other purposes.

== See also ==
- My Gov
