= Rosslyn Analytics =

American technology company

Rosslyn Data Technologies (aka Rosslyn Analytics)
- Company type: Public Limited Company
- Traded as: AIM: RDT
- Industry: Business intelligence
- Founded: 2007
- Founder: Charles Clark, Hugh Cox
- Headquarters: London, UK
- Area served: Worldwide
- Key people: John O’Hara (Chairman); Roger Bullen (CEO)
- Number of employees: 50-100

Rosslyn Data Technologies (aka Rosslyn Analytics) is a software-as-a-service vendor that provides procurement and master data management solutions. Its procurement portfolio includes software solutions for Spend Analytics, Supplier Information Management, Supplier Performance Management, and Supplier Contract Management. Master Data Management solutions include Data Extraction, Data Cleansing, and Data Enrichment; available via a cloud-based data platform.

The company is listed on AIM, a submarket of the London Stock Exchange, and is headquartered in London with offices in New York City and Chicago, Illinois.

== History ==
Rosslyn Analytics was founded in 2007 by Charles Clark and Hugh Cox. The company was named after Rosslyn Chapel in Midlothian, Scotland, which is famous for its mysterious carvings, believed to contain a message or even music that has never been verifiably decoded. In 2009, the company launched its first cloud-based business intelligence product - a self-service spends analytics app for its RAPid data platform.

In January 2012, Rosslyn Analytics entered the United States, establishing offices in New York City and Denver, Colorado.

Rosslyn Analytics was the first technology company to bring QlikView into the cloud in 2012.

In February 2014, the company filed its first patent with the UK Intellectual Property Office on machine-learning. In April, Rosslyn Analytics went public on AIM under the name of Rosslyn Data Technologies Group plc.
