= Open Government Initiative =

Open Government logo

The Open Government Initiative is an effort by the administration of President of the United States Barack Obama to "[create] an unprecedented level of openness in Government." The directive starting this initiative was issued on January 20, 2009, Obama's first day in office.

Since the rapid pace of technological growth at the turn of the century has given rise to the mass distribution of information, so too has the demand for the United States Government to increase the transparency with which they make decisions and create legislation; many civil servants share this sentiment with the public. There exist a few schools of thought regarding why Open Government Data (OGD) would benefit the public, but these can generally be broken into two parts: 1) the general public deserves the information that is being used to represent them and 2) the private sector will be able to create better social and economic conditions with access to this data.

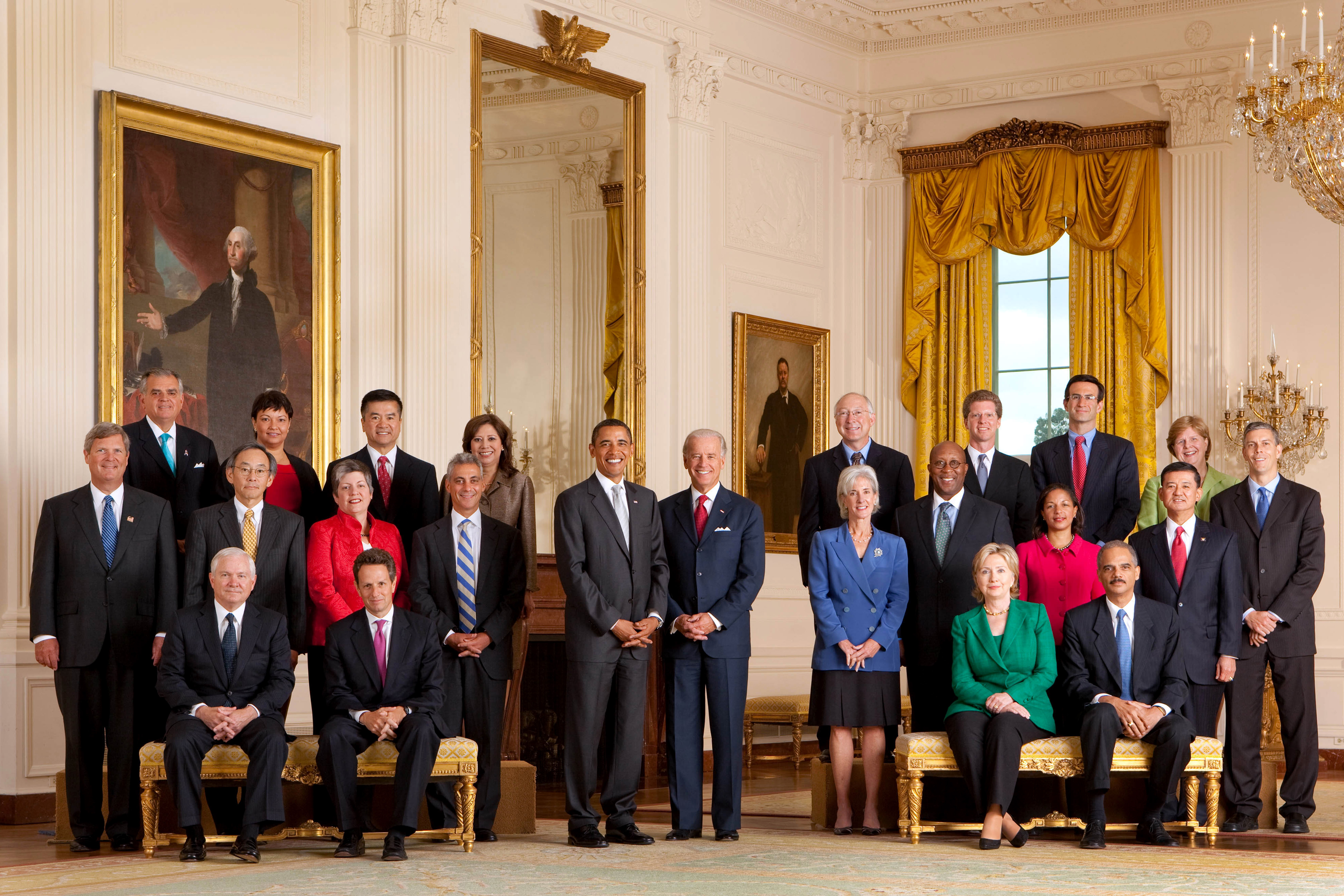

Beginning with President Obama's Memorandum on Transparency and Open Government in 2009, the Open Data Movement has led to governments around the world creating similar projects.

== Background and influences ==
The Open Government Initiative began on President Obama's first day in office when he issued his Memorandum on Transparency and Open Government. He summarized three principles that previous proponents for OGD had advocated for: the idea that government should be transparent, participatory, and collaborative. Following this statement, the State Department, after facilitating an online conversation between public employees and the public about their draft, published the Open Government plan using the Memorandum's three principles of transparency, participation, and collaboration.

One of the earliest influences for the Open Government Initiative came from the Freedom of Information Act (FOIA) in 1966. Later, the Privacy Act Amendments of 1974 created the classically modern version of the FOIA under President Ford. The next notable change came in 1996 when the FOIA made each resource available electronically to the public. Finally, the influences for the bill culminated with President Bush's signing of the OPEN Government Act of 2007, which was a philosophically similar act to the Memorandum given by President Obama in 2009.

Although not directly related to the idea of open government through technology, President Woodrow Wilson, during his term, aimed for "open covenants of peace, openly arrived at." In fact, the Ralph Bunche Library within the Department of State has been considering public input since 1789, alongside Secretary of State Rusk's Secretary's Open Forum from 1967.

== Philosophy ==
As mentioned, the advocates for OGD typically fall within two schools: those who derive socioeconomic benefits from OGD in the belief that new competitors can penetrate the marketplace with access to government data and those who believe that is a social right that the general public has access to government data, public policy, and the decision makers of the latter using the former. The first school of thought is called the Open Government Data movement and the second school of thought is called the Right to Information movement. However, the two movements want access to different types of data; the Open Government Data movement is more interested in receiving quantitative data from government databases, whereas the Right to Information movement want access to qualitative documents and reports.

A core component of OGD is the belief that the public should have free access to information rather than having to request it. For example, the Freedom of Information Act only allows for public access when it is requested and thus takes several days to complete the order; journalists comprised 7.6% of those who requested information.

== Modern implementations ==
The various forms of liquid democracy and public policy forums were created with similar beliefs as the Open Government Initiative. Similarly, Cloakroom, Change.org, Liquid.us, and Loomio were also created to facilitate public policy discussions and promote administration practices to become more accessible for the general public.

The most significant might be the Open Government Partnership, which after launching in 2011, now represents over 2 billion people. The countries within the partnership have agreed to execute the guidelines within the Open Government National Action Plans. The notable points from the plan include increased transparency from government spending, increased dissemination of information through electronic means, and greater accountability for political figures through tracked data.

The most recent form of Open Government legislation is the signing of the Foundations for Evidence-Based Policymaking Act, making the OPEN Government Data Act from 2018 law. The acronym OPEN stands for Open Public Electronic Necessary. This law requires extensive data-keeping that is supervised non-partisan data officer. A review will be held in three years to determine whether agencies were properly maintaining their information and the usefulness of that information to the public.

== Criticisms ==
There are a few common shortcomings that exist in regards to Open Government efforts.

The first is sustainability; many initiatives offer no revenue for the governments that attempt to make their data transparent to the public. For the data to become freely available, the associated government must make an initial investment into the infrastructure that would circulate the information. Because Open Data does not hold bipartisan support, funding is one of the main barriers to open governmental data.

The second is the fear that open data will only benefit those who can understand the information, which is typically those at the top of the socioeconomic hierarchy. Although in theory open data is meant to benefit the average citizen who is meant to feel more connected with their government's democratic processes, the information must composed in a way that is accessible.

The third weakness, thus, is the possibility that the information will be delivered in a way that is incomprehensible to the average citizen and can only be understood and applied by those already deeply familiar with governmental processes or those with the resources to access those who are familiar.

The fourth shortcoming stems from the philosophy of the Open Government Data movement in which open governmental data can lead to greater economic growth if used commercially. Once again, this shortcoming is related to the fear that only those already at the highest socioeconomic level will derive benefit from access to governmental data.

== Similar projects ==
Typically, most countries with OGD initiatives provide their information through portals. Africa contains several national OGD portals with 4 countries (Morocco, United Arab Emirates, Ghana and Kenya) having generally robust access to information; however, these portals typically include specific sectors but not the government as a whole.

India has a notable portal, but once again is limited in scope.

The European Data Portal consolidates many European countries that are filtered by sector, country, keyword, etc.

The Global Open Data Index provides an overview of 94 countries' open data efforts and ranks them based on their coverage of certain key sectors.

The Open Data Barometer is another ranking site for open data efforts around the world, including 115 countries.

The World Bank provides catalogues for open data across over 200 countries/jurisdictions.

== See also ==
- Open government
- Freedom of Information Act (United States)
- OPEN Government Act of 2007
