= Jeanne M. Holm (NASA) =

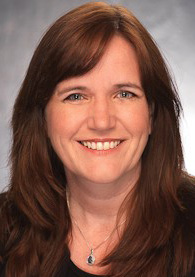
Jeanne M. Holm, Chief Knowledge Architect, NASA

Jeanne M. Holm was a Knowledge Architect at Jet Propulsion Laboratory and was involved in the NASA Knowledge Management team. She has since moved on to other opportunities.

Holm was the project manager for the NASA Portal. This internet project which was designed to provide one authoritative source of NASA content to the general public. In June 2003, Holm received an International Competia Award for Competitive Intelligence.
