= Ordinary Decent Criminal (slang) =

Informal legal terminology

Ordinary Decent Criminal (ODC) is a term used by the RUC and British Army, to distinguish criminals engaging in illegal practices for financial or personal ends in Northern Ireland.

In Ireland the term is sometimes used to refer to criminals who refuse to deal with the drugs trade.

== See also ==
- Ordinary Decent Criminal (crime/comedy movie, 2000)
