= International Open Government Data Conference =

Conference on the subject of open datasets

The logo of the conference

Lasting from November 15, 2010 to November 17, 2010, The International Open Government Data Conference was a conference sponsored by the United States General Services Administration and hosted by the United States Department of Commerce on the subject of open datasets globally, in coalition with the United States' previously opened data.gov.

== Presentations ==
Presentations on the subject of many global nations, including New Zealand's set up of a dataset website and Australia's presentation stressing identity security.

== Speakers ==
Many presenters appeared at the event, including the host, the Deputy Chief of Staff of the Department of Commerce, Jay Reich. Other notable attendees included:

- Vivek Kundra, Federal Chief Information Officer of the United States
- Derek Willis, Newsroom Developer, The New York Times
- Ken Rogers, Director of Enterprise Architecture and Planning, United States Department of State
- Neil Fantom, Manager of the Development Data Group, The World Bank
