= Open government =

Practice of sharing state documents and proceedings publicly and reusably

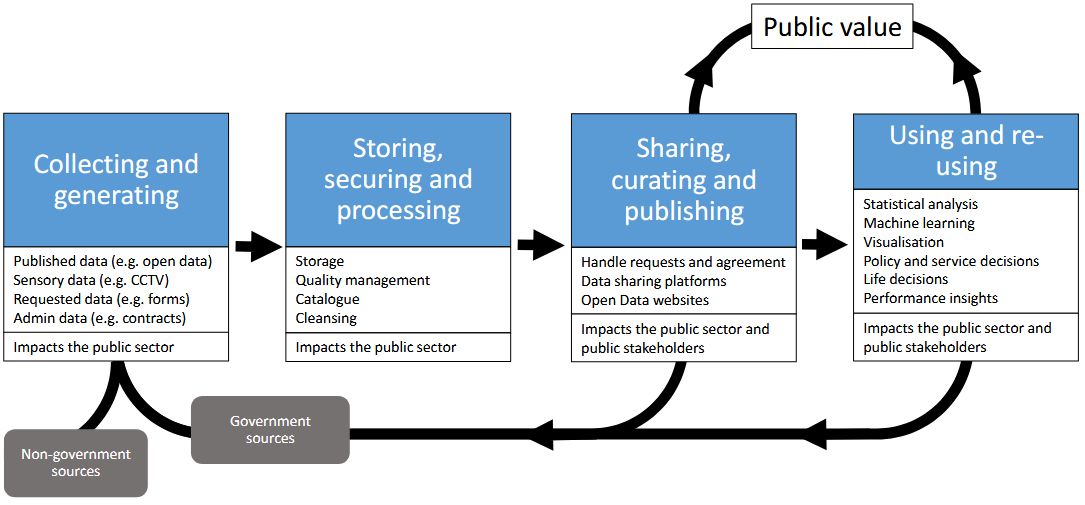
process model for open government data

Open government is the governing doctrine which maintains that citizens have the right to access the documents and proceedings of the government to allow for effective public oversight. In its broadest construction, it opposes reason of state and other considerations which have tended to legitimize extensive state secrecy. The origins of open-government arguments can be dated to the time of the European Age of Enlightenment, when philosophers debated the proper construction of a then nascent democratic society. It is also increasingly being associated with the concept of democratic reform. The United Nations' Sustainable Development Goal 16, for example, advocates for public access to information as a criterion for ensuring accountable and inclusive institutions.

== Components ==
The concept of open government is broad in scope but is most often connected to ideas of government transparency, participation and accountability. Transparency is defined as the visibility and inferability of information, accountability as answerability and enforceability, and participation is often graded along the "ladder of citizen participation." Harlan Yu and David G. Robinson specify the distinction between open data and open government in their paper "The New Ambiguity of "Open Government". They define open government in terms of service delivery and public accountability. They argue that technology can be used to facilitate disclosure of information, but that the use of open data technologies does not necessarily equate accountability.

The Organisation for Economic Co-operation and Development (OECD) approaches open government through the following categories: whole of government coordination, civic engagement and access to information, budget transparency, integrity and the fight against corruption, use of technology, and local development.

== History ==
The term 'open government' originated in the United States after World War II. Wallace Parks, who served on a subcommittee on Government Information created by the U.S. Congress, introduce the term in his 1957 article "The Open Government Principle: Applying the Right to Know under the Constitution". After this and after the passing of the Freedom of Information Act (FOIA) in 1966, federal courts began using the term as a synonym for government transparency.

Although this was the first time that 'open government' was introduced the concept of transparency and accountability in government can be traced back to Ancient Greece in fifth century B.C.E. Athens where different legal institutions regulated the behavior of officials and offered a path for citizens to express their grievances towards them. One such institution, the euthyna, held officials to a standard of "straightness" and enforced that they give an account in front of an Assembly of citizens about everything that they did that year.

In more recent history, the idea that government should be open to public scrutiny and susceptible to public opinion dates back to the time of the Enlightenment, when many philosophes made an attack on absolutist doctrines of state secrecy. The passage of formal legislature can also be traced to this time with Sweden, (which then included Finland as a Swedish-governed territory) where free press legislation was enacted as part of its constitution (Freedom of the Press Act, 1766).

Influenced by Enlightenment thought, the revolutions in United States (1776) and France (1789), enshrined provisions and requirements for public budgetary accounting and freedom of the press in constitutional articles. In the nineteenth century, attempts by Metternichean statesmen to row back on these measures were vigorously opposed by a number of eminent liberal politicians and writers, including Jeremy Bentham, John Stuart Mill and John Dalberg-Acton, 1st Baron Acton.

Open government is widely seen to be a key hallmark of contemporary democratic practice and is often linked to the passing of freedom of information legislation. Scandinavian countries claim to have adopted the first freedom of information legislation, dating the origins of its modern provisions to the eighteenth century and Finland continuing the presumption of openness after gaining independence in 1917, passing its Act on Publicity of Official Documents in 1951 (superseded by new legislation in 1999).

An emergent development also involves the increasing integration of software and mechanisms that allow citizens to become more directly involved in governance, particularly in the area of legislation. Some refer to this phenomenon as e-participation, which has been described as "the use of information and communication technologies to broaden and deepen political participation by enabling citizens to connect with one another and with their elected representatives".

== Current policies ==
=== Africa ===
Morocco's new constitution of 2011, outlined several goals the government wishes to achieve in order to guarantee the citizens right to information. The world has been offering support to the government in order to enact these reforms through the Transparency and Accountability Development Policy Loan (DPL). This loan is part of a joint larger program between the European Union and the African Development Bank to offer financial and technical support to governments attempting to implement reforms.

As of 2010, section 35 of Kenya's constitution ensures citizens' rights to government information. The article states "35.(1) Every citizen has the right of access to — (a) information held by the State; and (b) information held by another person and required for the exercise or protection of any right or fundamental freedom ... (3) The State shall publish and publicize any important information affecting the nation." Important government data is now freely available through the Kenya Open Data Initiative.

=== Asia ===
Taiwan started its e-government program in 1998 and since then has had a series of laws and executive orders to enforce open government policies. The Freedom of Government Information Law of 2005, stated that all government information must be made public. Such information includes budgets, administrative plans, communication of government agencies, subsidies. Since then it released its open data platform, data.gov.tw. The Sunflower Movement of 2014, emphasized the value that Taiwanese citizens place on openness and transparency. A white paper published by the National Development Council with policy goals for 2020 explores ways to increase citizen participation and use open data for further government transparency.

The Philippines passed the Freedom of Information Order in 2016, outlining guidelines to practice government transparency and full public disclosure. In accordance with its General Appropriations Act of 2012, the Philippine government requires government agencies to display a "transparency seal" on their websites, which contains information about the agency's functions, annual reports, officials, budgets, and projects.

The Right to Information (RTI) movement in India, created the RTI law in 2005 after environmental movements demanded the release of information regarding environmental deterioration due to industrialization. Another catalyst for the RTI law and other similar laws in southeast Asia, may have been due to multilateral agencies offering aid and loans in exchange for more transparency or "democratic" policies.

In October 2023, Iranian government publicly opposed measure "tritary branches of judiciary, executive, legislative transparency program". The transparency law never passes after nine months as judiciary and state did not consent. The government has the Iranfoia website for requests.

=== Europe ===
Welsh Government Health Minister, Vaughan Gething representing the government in February 2021 at a COVID-19 press conferences. All government videos are uploaded on open licences (CC-BY-SA and OGL).

In the Netherlands, large social unrest and the growing influence of televisions in the 1960s led to a push for more government openness. Access to information legislation was passed in 1980; since then, further emphasis has been placed on measuring the performance of government agencies.

Transparency as a legal principle underpins European Union law, for example in regard to the quality of the drafting of legislation, and as a principle to be exercised within government procurement procedures. European law academics argued in 2007 that a "new legal principle", transparency, might be emerging "in gestation" within EU law.

The government of the Netherlands adopted an Open Government in Action (Open overheid in actie) Plan for 2016–2017, which outlines nine concrete commitments to the open government standards set by the OECD.

Since 2018, in Wales, the Welsh Government has funded the training of Wikipedia skills in secondary schools, as part of the Welsh Baccalaureate and uses an open licence on all published videos and other content.

=== North America ===
In 2009, President Obama released a memorandum on transparency and open government and started the Open Government Initiative. In his memorandum put forward his administration's goal to strengthen democracy through a transparent, participatory and collaborative government. The initiative has goals of a transparent and collaborative government, in which to end secrecy in Washington, while improving effectiveness through increased communication between citizens and government officials. Movements for government transparency in recent United States history started in the 1950s after World War II because federal departments and agencies had started limiting information availability as a reaction to global hostilities during the war and due to fear of Cold War spies. Agencies were given the right to deny access to information "for good cause found" or "in the public interest". These policies made it difficult for congressional committees to get access to records and documents, which then led to explorations of possible legislative solutions.

=== Latin America ===
Since the early 2000s, transparency has been an important part of Latin America's efforts to professionalize government and fight corruption. All countries in the region have enacted freedom of information laws, beginning with Mexico, Peru, and Panama in 2002. Chile's Anti-Corruption and Probity Agenda and State Modernization Agenda. In 2008, Chile passed the Transparency Law has led to further open government reforms. Chile published its open government action plan for 2016–18 as part of its membership of the Open Government Partnership (OGP).

== Transparency ==
=== Overview ===
Transparency has been described as the visibility and inferability of information, defined by complete and findable information, which leads to accurate conclusions. It has two principal manifestations, monitoring transparency and consultation or collaboration transparency. It holds importance in more modern discussions because of its presence in new public management. For transparency to work, the idea goes beyond government involvement and must include public trust. Transparency in government has three main aspects. First, budgetary information must be viewable by the public. Second, there must be an effective way to make and enforce laws. Last, non-government organizations and a form of independent media must be at the center for public use. With transparency, there are also factors for data disclosure, such as timeliness, quality, and access and visibility. Data disclosure is important for transparency because it increases public understanding of governmental practices and is the goal of open government. However, there are arguments for both sides of transparency that must be considered.

=== Arguments for and against ===
==== For transparency ====
Transparency in government is often credited with generating government accountability, which supporters argue leads to reduction in government corruption, bribery and other malfeasance. This is mentioned later and discussed as accountability with transparency. Some commentators contend that an open, transparent government allows for the dissemination of information, which in turn helps produce greater knowledge and societal progress. Organizations supporting transparency policies such as the OECD and the Open Government Partnership claim that open government reforms can also lead to increased trust in government, although there is mixed evidence to support these claims, with increased transparency sometimes leading to reduced trust in government.

Public opinion can also be shifted when people have access to see the result of a certain policy. The United States government has at times forbid journalists to publish photographs of soldiers' coffins, an apparent attempt to manage emotional reactions that might heighten public criticism of ongoing wars; nonetheless, many believe that emotionally charged images can be valuable information. Similarly, some opponents of the death penalty have argued that executions should be televised so the public can "see what is being done in their name and with their tax dollars."

Government transparency is beneficial for efficient democracy, as information helps citizens form meaningful conclusions about upcoming legislation and vote for them in the next election. According to the Carnegie Endowment for International Peace, greater citizen participation in government is linked to government transparency.

Advocates of open government often argue that civil society, rather than government legislation, offers the best route to more transparent administration. They point to the role of whistleblowers reporting from inside the government bureaucracy (individuals like Daniel Ellsberg or Paul van Buitenen). They argue that an independent and inquiring press, printed or electronic, is often a stronger guarantor of transparency than legislative checks and balances.

The contemporary doctrine of open government finds its strongest advocates in non-governmental organizations keen to counter what they see as the inherent tendency of government to lapse, whenever possible, into secrecy. Prominent among these NGOs are bodies like Transparency International or the Open Society Institute. They argue that standards of openness are vital to the ongoing prosperity and development of democratic societies.

==== Against transparency ====
Government indecision, poor performance and gridlock are among the risks of government transparency, according to some critics. Political commentator David Frum wrote in 2014 that, "instead of yielding more accountability, however, these reforms [transparency reforms] have yielded more lobbying, more expense, more delay, and more indecision." Jason Grumet argues that government officials cannot properly deliberate, collaborate and compromise when everything they are doing is being watched. A randomized controlled trial conducted with 463 delegates of the National Assembly of Vietnam showed that increased transparency of the legislative proceedings, such as debates and query transcripts, curtailed delegates activity in the query sessions, avoiding taking part in activities that could embarrass leaders of the Vietnamese regime.

Privacy is another concern. Citizens may incur "adverse consequences, retribution or negative repercussions" from information provided by governments. Teresa Scassa, a law professor at the University of Ottawa, outlined three main possible privacy challenges in a 2014 article. First is the difficulty of balancing further transparency of government, while also protecting the privacy of personal information, or information about identifiable individuals that is in the hands of the government. Second is dealing with distinctions between data protection regulations between private and public sector actors because governments may access information collected by private companies which are not controlled by as stringent laws. Third is the release of "Big data", which may appear anonymized but can be reconnected to specific individuals using sophisticated algorithms.

Intelligence gathering, especially to identify violent threats (whether domestic or foreign), must often be done clandestinely. Frum wrote in 2014 that "the very same imperatives that drive states to collect information also require them to deny doing so. These denials matter even when they are not believed."

Moral certitude undergirds much transparency advocacy, but a number of scholars question whether it is possible for us to have that certitude. They have also highlighted how transparency can support certain neoliberal imperatives.

Concerns have also been raised in the election administration community about the use of excessive Freedom of Information Act requests as a tactic of election deniers to disrupt the functioning of local and county election offices. Often unreasonably broad, repetitive, or based on misinformation, the high volume of requests has led to what a Colorado official said amounts to "a denial-of-service attack on local government." Local election officials in Florida and Michigan have reported spending 25-70% of staff time in recent years on processing public records requests.

A review of recent state laws by the Center for Election Innovation & Research found at least 13 states that have sought to protect election staff from the abuse of FOIA requests in several ways, such as creating publicly accessible databases that do not require staff assistance and giving election staff the authority to deny unreasonable or clearly frivolous requests.

== Accountability ==
Accountability focuses on promoting transparency and allowing the public to understand the actions of their government. Public officials are expected to share details about how public resources are used and what their objectives are. Accountability in open government reduces corruption and increases transparency. However, there is transparency with and without accountability in open government. Transparency without accountability is often more difficult to monitor and there is less responsibility needed from the government. Transparency with accountability has proven to be more effective as a trustworthy relationship can be built between government agencies and people governed by them. The argument with or without transparency was mentioned previously and highlights major issues such as losing governmental trust or privacy issues with accountability. Some governments have created portals in order to allow people to see critical data and improve accountability and transparency. Not all data released on these portals is relevant and easily accessible meaning transparency is not always easily attainable. For example, Given the criteria for valuable information, governments should look for quality, completeness, timeliness, and usability when releasing important information that shows transparency and supports accountability.

== Relationship between transparency and accountability ==
Accountability in open government establishes the presence of transparency within governments. Accountability and transparency work to promote open government in democracies. Through organizations such as the Open Government Partnership (OGP) within the United States, which was established by the U.S. Department of State, there have been efforts to enhance democracies through both accountability and transparency. These efforts reach beyond the scope of North America and even into some Latin American and Asian countries. Promoting open government in Latin American countries has increased public trust and reduced corruption. Latin American countries were among those included in the OGP plan promoted by the United States in the Obama Administration. Additionally, in Asia, there has been a push towards right to information (RTI) to help build accountability. However, these measures in countries have shown open government measures are not one size fits all. They can fail and have to be tweaked for each region and there must be awareness from the public to demand accountability to ensure they receive it from the government.

Most of the relationship helps strengthen transparency in governments through the means of accountability. Transparency acts as the vision for open government, allowing the public to have quality access to government records and data. This open access forces governments to be more accountable as they cannot hide corruption with transparency. There can be transparency without accountability, which allows the government to choose which data is of significant value to be released to the public. This does not solve the lack of accountability and highlights the necessity of transparency with accountability. With both transparency and accountability, there must be regulations in place to make agencies justify why they are relinquishing certain information along with strict enforcement to ensure all transparency measures are fulfilled.

== Technology and open government ==
Governments and organizations are using new technologies as a tool for increased transparency. Examples include use of open data platforms to publish information online and the theory of open source governance.

Open government data (OGD), a term which refers specifically to the public publishing of government datasets, is often made available through online platforms such as data.gov.uk or www.data.gov. Proponents of OGD argue that easily accessible data pertaining to governmental institutions allows for further citizen engagement within political institutions. OGD principles require that data is complete, primary, timely, accessible, machine processable, non-discriminatory, non-proprietary, and license free.

Public and private sector platforms provide an avenue for citizens to engage while offering access to transparent information that citizens have come to expect. Numerous organizations have worked to consolidate resources for citizens to access government (local, state and federal) budget spending, stimulus spending, lobbyist spending, legislative tracking, and more.

== Organizations ==
- Open Government Partnership (OGP) is an organization launched in 2011 to allow domestic reformers to make their own governments across the world more open, accountable, and responsive to citizens. Since 2011, OGP has grown to 75 participating countries today whose government and civil societies work together to develop and implement open government reforms.
- Code for All is a non-partisan, non-profit international network of organizations who believe technology leads to new opportunities for citizens to lead a more prominent role in the political sphere and have a positive impact on their communities. The organizations relies on technology to improve government transparency and engage citizens.
- The Sunlight Foundation was a nonprofit, nonpartisan organization founded in 2006 that used civic tech, open data, and policy analysis to make information from government and politics more transparent to everyone. Their ultimate vision was to increase democratic participation and achieve changes on political money flow and who can influence government. While their work began with an intent to focus only on the US Congress, their work influenced the local, state, federal, and international levels.
- Open Government Pioneers UK is an example of a civil society led initiative using open source approaches to support citizens and civil society organisations use open government as a way to secure progress towards the Sustainable Development Goals. It uses an Open Wiki to plan the development of an open government civil society movement across the UK's home nations.
- OpenSpending aims to build and use open source tools and datasets to gather and analyse the financial transactions of governments around the world.

== See also ==
- Access to public information
- Censorship
- Civic technology
- e-democracy
- e-government
- Fiscal transparency
- Government by algorithm
- Glasnost
- Issue tracking systems in government
- International Open Government Data Conference
- Open data
- Open philanthropy
- Open society
- "The Open Society and Its Enemies" – an essay by philosopher Karl Popper
- Political corruption
- Political communication
- Privacy
- Public trust
- Transparency (behavior)
- WikiLeaks
- Central bank independence
- Civil control of the military
- Civil service independence
- Judicial independence
- Editorial independence
- Independent media
- Separation of church and state
