= Open data =

Openly accessible data

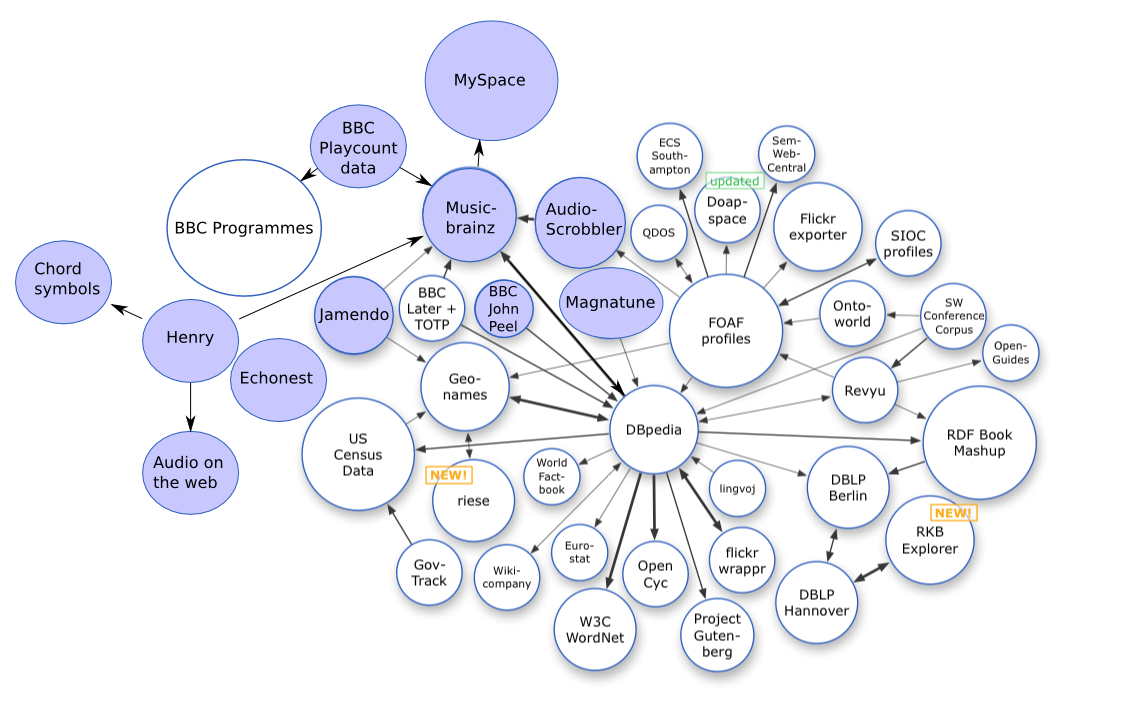
Open data map

Linked open data cloud in August 2014

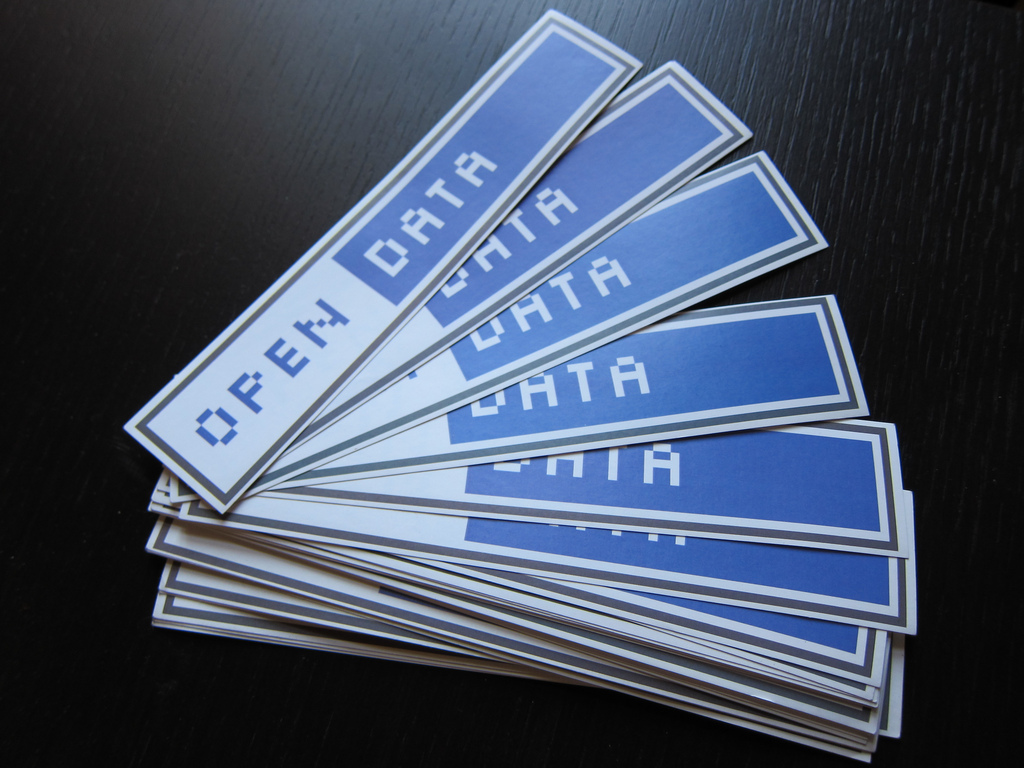
Clear labelling of the licensing terms is a key component of open data, and icons like the one pictured here are being used for that purpose.

Open data are data that are openly accessible, exploitable, editable and shareable by anyone for any purpose. Open data are generally licensed under an open license.

The goals of the open data movement are similar to those of other "open(-source)" movements such as open-source software, open-source hardware, open content, open specifications, open education, open educational resources, open government, open knowledge, open access, open science, and the open web. The growth of the open data movement is paralleled by a rise in intellectual property rights. The philosophy behind open data has been long established (for example in the Mertonian tradition of science), but the term "open data" itself is recent, gaining popularity with the rise of the Internet and World Wide Web and, especially, with the launch of open-data government initiatives Data.gov, Data.gov.uk and Data.gov.in.

Open data can be linked data—referred to as linked open data.

One of the most important forms of open data is open government data (OGD), which is a form of open data created by ruling government institutions. The importance of open government data is born from it being a part of citizens' everyday lives, down to the most routine and mundane tasks that are seemingly far removed from government.

The abbreviation FAIR/O data is sometimes used to indicate that the dataset or database in question complies with the principles of FAIR data and carries an explicit data‑capable open license.

== Overview ==
The concept of open data is not new, but a formalized definition is relatively new. Open data as a phenomenon denotes that governmental data should be available to anyone with a possibility of redistribution in any form without any copyright restriction. One more definition is the Open Definition which can be summarized as "a piece of data is open if anyone is free to use, reuse, and redistribute it—subject only, at most, to the requirement to attribute and/or share-alike." Other definitions, including the Open Data Institute's "open data is data that anyone can access, use or share," have an accessible short version of the definition but refer to the formal definition. Open data may include non-textual material such as maps, genomes, connectomes, chemical compounds, mathematical and scientific formulae, medical data, and practice, bioscience and biodiversity data.

A major barrier to the open data movement is the commercial value of data. Access to, or re-use of, data is often controlled by public or private organizations. Control may be through access restrictions, licenses, copyright, patents and charges for access or re-use. Advocates of open data argue that these restrictions detract from the common good and that data should be available without restrictions or fees. There are many other, smaller barriers as well.

Creators of data do not consider the need to state the conditions of ownership, licensing and re-use; instead presuming that not asserting copyright enters the data into the public domain. For example, many scientists do not consider the data published with their work to be theirs to control and consider the act of publication in a journal to be an implicit release of data into the commons. The lack of a license makes it difficult to determine the status of a data set and may restrict the use of data offered in an "Open" spirit. Because of this uncertainty it is possible for public or private organizations to aggregate said data, claim that it is protected by copyright, and then resell it.

== Major sources ==
The State of Open Data, a 2019 book from African Minds

Open data can come from any source. This section lists some of the fields that publish (or at least discuss publishing) a large amount of open data.

=== In science ===
The concept of open access to scientific data was established with the formation of the World Data Center system, in preparation for the International Geophysical Year of 1957–1958. The International Council of Scientific Unions (now the International Council for Science) oversees several World Data Centres with the mission to minimize the risk of data loss and to maximize data accessibility.

While the open-science-data movement long predates the Internet, the availability of fast, readily available networking has significantly changed the context of open science data, as publishing or obtaining data has become much less expensive and time-consuming.

The Human Genome Project was a major initiative that exemplified the power of open data. It was built upon the so-called Bermuda Principles, stipulating that: "All human genomic sequence information … should be freely available and in the public domain in order to encourage research and development and to maximize its benefit to society". More recent initiatives such as the Structural Genomics Consortium have illustrated that the open data approach can be used productively within the context of industrial R&D.

In 2004, the Science Ministers of all nations of the Organisation for Economic Co-operation and Development (OECD), which includes most developed countries of the world, signed a declaration which states that all publicly funded archive data should be made publicly available. Following a request and an intense discussion with data-producing institutions in member states, the OECD published in 2007 the OECD Principles and Guidelines for Access to Research Data from Public Funding as a soft-law recommendation.

Examples of open data in science:

- https://www.earth-system-science-data.net/ – Journal of publications describing and linking to open scientific datasets related to Earth system sciences. Review of the dataset itself is an integral component of peer review. Launched in 2008
- data.uni-muenster.de – Open data about scientific artifacts from the University of Muenster, Germany. Launched in 2011.
- Dataverse Network Project – archival repository software promoting data sharing, persistent data citation, and reproducible research.
- linkedscience.org/data – Open scientific datasets encoded as Linked Data. Launched in 2011, ended 2018.
- systemanaturae.org – Open scientific datasets related to wildlife classified by animal species. Launched in 2015.

=== In government ===
There are a range of different arguments for government open data. Some advocates say that making government information available to the public as machine readable open data can facilitate government transparency, accountability and public participation. "Open data can be a powerful force for public accountability—it can make existing information easier to analyze, process, and combine than ever before, allowing a new level of public scrutiny." Governments that enable public viewing of data can help citizens engage within the governmental sectors and "add value to that data." Open data experts have nuanced the impact that opening government data may have on government transparency and accountability. In a widely cited paper, scholars David Robinson and Harlan Yu contend that governments may project a veneer of transparency by publishing machine-readable data that does not actually make government more transparent or accountable. Drawing from earlier studies on transparency and anticorruption, World Bank political scientist Tiago C. Peixoto extended Yu and Robinson's argument by highlighting a minimal chain of events necessary for open data to lead to accountability:

1. relevant data is disclosed;
2. the data is widely disseminated and understood by the public;
3. the public reacts to the content of the data; and
4. public officials either respond to the public's reaction or are sanctioned by the public through institutional means.

Some make the case that opening up official information can support technological innovation and economic growth by enabling third parties to develop new kinds of digital applications and services.

Several national governments have created websites to distribute a portion of the data they collect. It is a concept for a collaborative project in the municipal Government to create and organize culture for Open Data or Open government data.

Additionally, other levels of government have established open data websites. There are many government entities pursuing Open Data in Canada. Data.gov lists the sites of a total of 40 US states and 46 US cities and counties with websites to provide open data, e.g., the state of Maryland, the state of California, US and New York City.

At the international level, the United Nations has an open data website that publishes statistical data from member states and UN agencies, and the World Bank published a range of statistical data relating to developing countries. The European Commission has created two portals for the European Union: the EU Open Data Portal which gives access to open data from the EU institutions, agencies and other bodies and the European Data Portal that provides datasets from local, regional and national public bodies across Europe. The two portals were consolidated to data.europa.eu on April 21, 2021.

Italy is the first country to release standard processes and guidelines under a Creative Commons license for spread usage in the Public Administration. The open model is called the Open Data Management Cycle and was adopted in several regions such as Veneto and Umbria. Main cities like Reggio Calabria and Genova have also adopted this model.

In October 2015, the Open Government Partnership launched the International Open Data Charter, a set of principles and best practices for the release of governmental open data formally adopted by seventeen governments of countries, states and cities during the OGP Global Summit in Mexico.

In July 2024, the OECD adopted Creative Commons CC-BY-4.0 licensing for its published data and reports.

=== In non-profit organizations ===
Many non-profit organizations offer open access to their data, as long it does not undermine their users', members' or third party's privacy rights. In comparison to for-profit corporations, they do not seek to monetize their data. OpenNWT launched a website offering open data of elections. CIAT offers open data to anybody who is willing to conduct big data analytics in order to enhance the benefit of international agricultural research. DBLP, which is owned by a non-profit organization Dagstuhl, offers its database of scientific publications from computer science as open data.

Hospitality exchange services, including Bewelcome, Warm Showers, and CouchSurfing (before it became for-profit) have offered scientists access to their anonymized data for analysis, public research, and publication.

== Publication of open data ==
=== Open repositories ===
- arXiv – open-access repository of electronic preprints and postprints (known as e-prints)
- Zenodo – open repository developed under the European OpenAIRE program and operated by CERN
- Figshare – open data and software hosting
- HAL (open archive) – open archive where authors can deposit scholarly documents from all academic fields
- Dryad (repository) – data and software related to science papers
- Open Science Framework – project management and sharing platform

== Policies and strategies ==
At a small level, a business or research organization's policies and strategies towards open data will vary, sometimes greatly. One common strategy employed is the use of a data commons. A data commons is an interoperable software and hardware platform that aggregates (or collocates) data, data infrastructure, and data-producing and data-managing applications in order to better allow a community of users to manage, analyze, and share their data with others over both short- and long-term timelines. Ideally, this interoperable cyberinfrastructure should be robust enough "to facilitate transitions between stages in the life cycle of a collection" of data and information resources while still being driven by common data models and workspace tools enabling and supporting robust data analysis. The policies and strategies underlying a data commons will ideally involve numerous stakeholders, including the data commons service provider, data contributors, and data users.

Grossman et al suggests six major considerations for a data commons strategy that better enables open data in businesses and research organizations. Such a strategy should address the need for:

- permanent, persistent digital IDs, which enable access controls for datasets;
- permanent, discoverable metadata associated with each digital ID;
- application programming interface (API)-based access, tied to an authentication and authorization service;
- data portability;
- data "peering," without access, egress, and ingress charges; and
- a rationed approach to users computing data over the data commons.

Beyond individual businesses and research centers, and at a more macro level, countries like Germany have launched their own official nationwide open data strategies, detailing how data management systems and data commons should be developed, used, and maintained for the greater public good.

== Arguments for and against ==
Opening government data is only a waypoint on the road to improving education, improving government, and building tools to solve other real-world problems. While many arguments have been made categorically, the following discussion of arguments for and against open data highlights that these arguments often depend highly on the type of data and its potential uses.

Arguments made on behalf of open data include the following:

- "Data belongs to the human race". Typical examples are genomes, data on organisms, medical science, environmental data following the Aarhus Convention.
- Public money was used to fund the work, and so it should be universally available.
- It was created by or at a government institution (this is common in US National Laboratories and government agencies).
- Facts cannot legally be copyrighted.
- Sponsors of research do not get full value unless the resulting data are freely available.
- Restrictions on data re-use create an anticommons.
- Data are required for the smooth process of running communal human activities and are an important enabler of socio-economic development (health care, education, economic productivity, etc.).
- In scientific research, the rate of discovery is accelerated by better access to data.
- Making data open helps combat "data rot" and ensure that scientific research data are preserved over time.
- Statistical literacy benefits from open data. Instructors can use locally relevant data sets to teach statistical concepts to their students.
- Allowing open data in the scientific community is essential for increasing the rate of discoveries and recognizing significant patterns.

It is generally held that factual data cannot be copyrighted. Publishers frequently add copyright statements (often forbidding re-use) to scientific data accompanying publications. It may be unclear whether the factual data embedded in full text are part of the copyright.

While the human abstraction of facts from paper publications is normally accepted as legal there is often an implied restriction on the machine extraction by robots.

Unlike open access, where groups of publishers have stated their concerns, open data is normally challenged by individual institutions. Their arguments have been discussed less in public discourse and there are fewer quotes to rely on at this time.

Arguments against making all data available as open data include the following:

- Government funding may not be used to duplicate or challenge the activities of the private sector (e.g. PubChem).
- Governments have to be accountable for the efficient use of taxpayer's money: If public funds are used to aggregate the data and if the data will bring commercial (private) benefits to only a small number of users, the users should reimburse governments for the cost of providing the data.
- Open data may lead to exploitation of, and rapid publication of results based on, data pertaining to developing countries by rich and well-equipped research institutes, without any further involvement and/or benefit to local communities (helicopter research); similarly, to the historical open access to tropical forests that has led to the misappropriation ("Global Pillage") of plant genetic resources from developing countries.
- The revenue earned by publishing data can be used to cover the costs of generating and/or disseminating the data, so that the dissemination can continue indefinitely.
- The revenue earned by publishing data permits non-profit organizations to fund other activities (e.g. learned society publishing supports the society).
- The government gives specific legitimacy for certain organizations to recover costs (NIST in US, Ordnance Survey in UK).
- Privacy concerns may require that access to data is limited to specific users or to sub-sets of the data.
- Collecting, 'cleaning', managing and disseminating data are typically labour- and/or cost-intensive processes – whoever provides these services should receive fair remuneration for providing those services.
- Sponsors do not get full value unless their data is used appropriately – sometimes this requires quality management, dissemination and branding efforts that can best be achieved by charging fees to users.
- Often, targeted end-users cannot use the data without additional processing (analysis, apps etc.) – if anyone has access to the data, none may have an incentive to invest in the processing required to make data useful (typical examples include biological, medical, and environmental data).
- There is no control to the secondary use (aggregation) of open data.

The paper entitled "Optimization of Soft Mobility Localization with Sustainable Policies and Open Data" argues that open data is a valuable tool for improving the sustainability and equity of soft mobility in cities. The author argues that open data can be used to identify the needs of different areas of a city, develop algorithms that are fair and equitable, and justify the installation of soft mobility resources.

== Relation to other open activities ==
The goals of the Open Data movement are similar to those of other "Open" movements.

- Open access is concerned with making scholarly publications freely available on the internet. In some cases, these articles include open datasets as well.
- Open specifications are documents describing file types or protocols, where the documents are openly licensed. These specifications are primarily meant to improve different software handling the same file types or protocols, but monopolists forced by law into open specifications might make it more difficult.
- Open content is concerned with making resources aimed at a human audience (such as prose, photos, or videos) freely available.
- Open knowledge. Open Knowledge International argues for openness in a range of issues including, but not limited to, those of open data. It covers (a) scientific, historical, geographic or otherwise (b) Content such as music, films, books (c) Government and other administrative information. Open data is included within the scope of the Open Knowledge Definition, which is alluded to in Science Commons' Protocol for Implementing Open Access Data.
- Open notebook science refers to the application of the Open Data concept to as much of the scientific process as possible, including failed experiments and raw experimental data.
- Open-source software is concerned with the open-source licenses under which computer programs can be distributed and is not normally concerned primarily with data.
- Open educational resources are freely accessible, openly licensed documents and media that are useful for teaching, learning, and assessing as well as for research purposes.
- Open research/open science/open science data (linked open science) means an approach to open and interconnect scientific assets like data, methods and tools with linked data techniques to enable transparent, reproducible and interdisciplinary research.
- Open-GLAM (Galleries, Library, Archives, and Museums) is an initiative and network that supports exchange and collaboration between cultural institutions that support open access to their digitalized collections. The GLAM-Wiki Initiative helps cultural institutions share their openly licensed resources with the world through collaborative projects with experienced Wikipedia editors. Open Heritage Data is associated with Open GLAM, as openly licensed data in the heritage sector is now frequently used in research, publishing, and programming, particularly in the Digital Humanities.

== Open Data as commons ==
=== Ideas and definitions ===
Formally both the definition of Open Data and commons revolve around the concept of shared resources with a low barrier to access. Substantially, digital commons include Open Data in that it includes resources maintained online, such as data. Overall, looking at operational principles of Open Data one could see the overlap between Open Data and (digital) commons in practice. Principles of Open Data are sometimes distinct depending on the type of data under scrutiny. Nonetheless, they are somewhat overlapping and their key rationale is the lack of barriers to the re-use of data(sets). Regardless of their origin, principles across types of Open Data hint at the key elements of the definition of commons. These are, for instance, accessibility, re-use, findability, non-proprietarily. Additionally, although to a lower extent, threats and opportunities associated with both Open Data and commons are similar. Synthesizing, they revolve around (risks and) benefits associated with (uncontrolled) use of common resources by a large variety of actors.

=== The System ===
Both commons and Open Data can be defined by the features of the resources that fit under these concepts, but they can be defined by the characteristics of the systems their advocates push for. Governance is a focus for both Open Data and commons scholars. The key elements that outline commons and Open Data peculiarities are the differences (and maybe opposition) to the dominant market logics as shaped by capitalism. Perhaps it is this feature that emerges in the recent surge of the concept of commons as related to a more social look at digital technologies in the specific forms of digital and, especially, data commons.

=== Real-life case ===
Application of open data for societal good has been demonstrated in academic research works. The paper "Optimization of Soft Mobility Localization with Sustainable Policies and Open Data" uses open data in two ways. First, it uses open data to identify the needs of different areas of a city. For example, it might use data on population density, traffic congestion, and air quality to determine where soft mobility resources, such as bike racks and charging stations for electric vehicles, are most needed. Second, it uses open data to develop algorithms that are fair and equitable. For example, it might use data on the demographics of a city to ensure that soft mobility resources are distributed in a way that is accessible to everyone, regardless of age, disability, or gender. The paper also discusses the challenges of using open data for soft mobility optimization. One challenge is that open data is often incomplete or inaccurate. Another challenge is that it can be difficult to integrate open data from different sources. Despite these challenges, the paper argues that open data is a valuable tool for improving the sustainability and equity of soft mobility in cities.

An exemplification of how the relationship between Open Data and commons and how their governance can potentially disrupt the market logic otherwise dominating big data is a project conducted by Human Ecosystem Relazioni in Bologna (Italy).

This project aimed at extrapolating and identifying online social relations surrounding "collaboration" in Bologna. Data was collected from social networks and online platforms for citizens collaboration. Eventually data was analyzed for the content, meaning, location, timeframe, and other variables. Overall, online social relations for collaboration were analyzed based on network theory. The resulting dataset have been made available online as Open Data (aggregated and anonymized); nonetheless, individuals can reclaim all their data. This has been done with the idea of making data into a commons. This project exemplifies the relationship between Open Data and commons, and how they can disrupt the market logic driving big data use in two ways. First, it shows how such projects, following the rationale of Open Data somewhat can trigger the creation of effective data commons. The project itself was offering different types of support to social network platform users to have contents removed. Second, opening data regarding online social networks interactions has the potential to significantly reduce the monopolistic power of social network platforms on those data.

== Funders' mandates ==
Several funding bodies that mandate Open Access also mandate Open Data. A good expression of requirements (truncated in places) is given by the Canadian Institutes of Health Research (CIHR):

- to deposit bioinformatics, atomic and molecular coordinate data, and experimental data into the appropriate public database immediately upon publication of research results.
- to retain original data sets for at least five years after the grant. This applies to all data, whether published or not.

Other bodies promoting the deposition of data and full text include the Wellcome Trust. An academic paper published in 2013 advocated that Horizon 2020 (the science funding mechanism of the EU) should mandate that funded projects hand in their databases as "deliverables" at the end of the project so that they can be checked for third-party usability and then shared.

== See also ==
- Open knowledge
- Free content
- Openness
- Committee on Data of the International Science Council
- CKAN - Comprehensive Knowledge Archive Network
- Creative Commons license
- Data curation
- Data governance
- Data management
- Data publishing
- Data sharing
- Demand-responsive transport
- Digital preservation
- FAIR data principles
- International Open Data Day
- Linked data and Linked open data
- Open energy system databases
- Urban informatics
- Wikibase
- Wikidata
- List of datasets for machine-learning research
- Open Standard
- Open weights
- Digital public goods
