= Chris Lightfoot =

English political activist and scientist

Chris Lightfoot (4 August 1978 – 11 February 2007) was an English scientist and political activist. He was the first developer, with Tom Steinberg, at e-democracy charity mySociety.

== Family and early life ==
Lightfoot was born in Dulwich, England, in 1978. His mother, Prue, was a journalist and his father, Robert, was a patent agent. His older sister Steph taught him how to program the family's BBC Micro. He attended Westminster School, where he was part of the team representing the school in the British Informatics Olympiad. He used his knowledge of programming to produce a crater investigation model in the physics department at Westminster which was of an extremely high standard. This was part of a physics project in which he was awarded a 15 Merit — an outstanding and very rare full mark.

He studied the Natural Science Tripos with a focus on Physics at Clare College, Cambridge. He graduated with a Master's degree in 2000.

Lightfoot was one of the founders of Mythic Beasts, an ISP.

== Death ==
He had suffered from depression throughout his adult life. Lightfoot died by suicide on 11 February 2007.

== Contributions to Internet ==
He played an important role in the development of:

- PledgeBank, which addresses the prisoner's dilemma for all sorts of social-good projects;
- YourHistoryHere.com — a site where people can annotate a map with their knowledge of the history of that place.
- Placeopedia — an online gazetteer that is a mashup of Google Maps and the English Wikipedia.
- TheyWorkForYou — tracks speeches and activities of Members of Parliament, including presenting an accessible version of Hansard
- WriteToThem.com — facilitates contacting elected representatives at all levels of UK government.
- HearFromYourMP.com — a site encouraging MPs to email their constituents.
- hassleme.co.uk — "Because your mother can't remind you of everything."
- DowningStreetSays.com — searchable text of the Prime Minister's Spokesman's briefings.
- Downing Street e-Petitions — a petitions website for 10 Downing Street.
- FixMyStreet — another map-based application facilitating citizens informing their local authority of problems needing their attention, such as broken streetlamps etc.
- tpop3d — a pop3 server
- vmail-sql — vmail-sql, a virtual email hosting system backed by MySQL
- Political Survey and — An attempt to generate a multi-axis political model based solely on principal components analysis of survey results, rather than preconceived axes.
- WhatDoTheyKnow is dedicated to Chris, who thought up the idea of automatically republishing email responses
- Mythic beasts (ISP), co-founder of the Cambridge based hosting ISP.
- He also did additional coding on the video game LittleBigPlanet, which was released a year after his death. The game was dedicated to his memory.
