= Bytemark =

British internet hosting services company

Bytemark Ltd.
- Industry: Internet, cloud computing
- Founded: 12 July 2002; 22 years ago
- Founders: Matthew Bloch; Peter Taphouse
- Headquarters: York, North Yorkshire, U.K.
- Area served: Worldwide
- Services: Internet hosting service
- Website: www.bytemark.co.uk

Bytemark is a server hosting and datacentre provider headquartered in York, United Kingdom. It was founded in 2002, and was the first provider of virtual machines and cloud hosting through User-mode Linux in 2003.

In 2012, the company launched BigV, a public cloud platform designed in-house using open source software. In 2013, it moved into a £1.2 million datacentre and headquarters in York. In 2017, their BigV platform was renamed Bytemark Cloud. In September 2018, the company was acquired by iomart Group plc.

On 2 February 2023 Bytemark announced that it would cease to support BigV on 30 April 2023.

== Environmental and ethical policies ==
Bytemark's datacentre uses fresh-air cooling, not common in the UK, and was shortlisted for Innovation in Medium Data Center at the DatacenterDynamics Awards EMEA 2013. Each of its servers is built using efficient power supplies as certified by the 80 Plus scheme, which requires power supplies to be at least 80% efficient at up to 100% rated load. To reduce the bias found in traditional recruitment processes, the company developed their own anonymous recruitment process in 2015.

== Awards ==
In 2014, Bytemark was named one of the Top 50 Fastest Grown Tech Companies in the North at the Northern Tech Awards with revenue growth of 44%. Financially, the company turned over £2.5 million in 2013. In 2014, this grew to £3 million. In 2015, the company was awarded the Fair Tax Mark.

== Support of open-source projects ==
Bytemark has a history of contributing to and supporting free software.

They support LibreOffice through provision of a build server. In 2009, the company became a supporter of XBMC with the same. In 2012, they started supporting Cyanogenmod with build servers.

In 2013, the company contributed hosting services worth £150,000 to the Debian project, having used Debian since the company was founded. The company also supported OpenStreetMap with DNS services and servers to support version control, mailing lists and help pages. The company also support projects for social good, including sponsoring servers for mySociety, who operate FixMyStreet, TheyWorkForYou and WhatDoTheyKnow.
