= FixMyStreet.com =

Website for reporting problems with streets in the UK

FixMyStreet
- Website type: Street-fault reporting website
- Owner: mySociety
- Creator: User-generated/Public Authority generated
- Website: fixmystreet.com
- Commercial: No
- Registration: Optional
- Launched: February 2007
- Current status: Active

FixMyStreet is a map based website and app by mySociety that helps people in the United Kingdom inform their local authority of problems needing their attention, such as potholes, broken streetlamps, etc. It is the UK instance of FixMyStreet.

Reports are also published on the site.

While most local councils have their own reporting systems, FixMyStreet solves the fact that the reporter may not know which authority is responsible for a specific type of problem in a specific location. By use of the MapIt software, FixMyStreet matches users’ postcodes and the category of their problem to the correct local authority.

== History ==
The site was initially funded by the Department for Constitutional Affairs Innovations Fund and built by mySociety, in conjunction with the Young Foundation; the code for the site was written by Francis Irving, Matthew Somerville, and Chris Lightfoot. The site was originally launched as "Neighbourhood Fix-It", but it was decided to change to a shorter and easier name in June 2007 when one became available. A FixMyStreet app was developed in 2008 to enable iPhone users to report problems using their phones, and since then volunteers have written apps for Nokia and Android, as well as another app for the iPhone.

FixMyStreet won an award at SustainIT eWell-Being Awards in 2008, and has been listed in various newspaper best or top websites. The site was an inspiration for the government's "Show Us A Better Way" contest.

A version of the site for reporting abandoned empty homes, in conjunction with the Empty Homes Agency, Shelter Cymru and the Scottish Empty Homes Partnership, was launched in late 2008, and was called "a model of easy use" by the Guardian This site was repurposed for the Channel 4 TV series The Great British Property Scandal in December 2011, which was nominated for a BAFTA and an Emmy. An adapted version of the FixMyStreet software also underlies cycle accident-reporting site Collideoscope

In 2010, FixMyStreet was closely integrated with The Guardian newspaper's Guardian Local project. Emily Bell wrote in her launch message: "A hugely important part of this project has been the involvement of mySociety, who we've collaborated with to provide customised versions of their civic tools, allowing and encouraging local residents to report issues, contact their representatives and generally become engaged in the governance and care of their locality.", and Alistair Tibbitt, Development Manager for Greener Leith wrote "the Guardian certainly deserve plaudits for integrating the local FixMyStreet service so tightly into their new Edinburgh Beat Blog."

== Responses ==
FixMyStreet.com was mentioned as the main inspiration for the Slovak project "Odkaz pre starostu" (Message for the Mayor), which started in 2010. In 2021, all 8 seat cities of Slovak regions, 53 other cities and 77 municipalities are cooperating with this project, which is dominant in Slovakia in its field. Until 2021, about 50,000 complaints were resolved using this web portal.
