= NBCNews.com =

NBC News' website

- The home page for NBCNews.com, as of February 13, 2015
- Website type: News website
- Available in: English
- Owners: NBCUniversal (Comcast)
- Commercial: Yes
- Registration: None
- Launched: 1996; 30 years ago (as msnbc.com)

NBCNews.com, formerly known as msnbc.com, is a news website owned and operated by NBCUniversal as the online arm of NBC News. Along with original and wire reporting, it features content from digital operations such as NBC News Now, and television programming such as Today, NBC Nightly News, Meet The Press, and Dateline NBC,

The site was founded in 1996 as a 50-50 venture between NBC and Microsoft; at the same time the two companies formed a separate joint venture for the cable news network MSNBC. Although they shared the same name, msnbc.com and MSNBC maintained separate corporate structures and news operations, with msnbc.com headquartered on the West Coast on the Microsoft campus in Redmond, Washington, and MSNBC in the NBC headquarters in New York.

Microsoft divested its stake in the MSNBC channel in 2005, and divested its stake in msnbc.com in July 2012; the channel was concurrently rebranded under the NBC News name, and the msnbc.com domain name was later relaunched as a site for the cable network.

== History ==
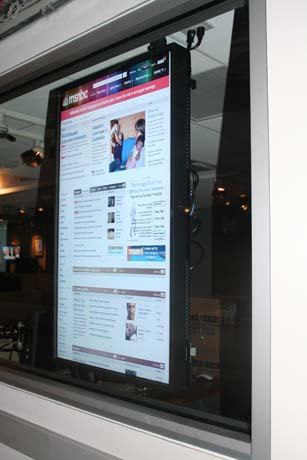
A flat screen monitor on a wall in 30 Rock, showing msnbc.com

The site was established as msnbc.com in 1996 at the same time as the MSNBC cable news channel. Both were initially joint ventures with the software company Microsoft, with boards of directors composed of senior executives from Microsoft and NBC Universal. The MSNBC TV channel was based in New Jersey, and msnbc.com was based at Microsoft's headquarters in Redmond, Washington. While NBC bought Microsoft's stake in MSNBC in 2005, msnbc.com remained a partnership between the two companies, with MSNBC and msnbc.com remaining separate entities. Msnbc.com also acquired several other news websites, including community-driven news site Newsvine in October 2007, and the hyperlocal news site EveryBlock in August 2009. It also launched an internal start-up, BreakingNews.com.

Despite sharing its name with the MSNBC channel, the content of the two outlets had become increasingly distinct. While msnbc.com remained a traditional, nonpartisan news service with its own staff of NBC News journalists, the MSNBC channel now primarily carried liberal-leaning opinion-based programming covering U.S. politics. NBC's staff were concerned about the differences, as some readers may have believed that the msnbc.com site was also a liberal-oriented news outlet like the channel. Plans were drafted to re-brand its conventional news site under a different name, such as NBCNews.com, and to re-purpose msnbc.com as a website for the MSNBC channel itself.

On July 14, 2012, NBCUniversal officially announced that Microsoft had sold back its half share of msnbc.com for $300 million, and the rebranding of the site as NBCNews.com. After a transitional period, MSNBC.com was relaunched in 2013 as an opinion-based website featuring content from MSNBC channel's personalities and contributors, and video content from its shows. Despite the separation of msnbc.com from Microsoft, the site would still be a part of and receive traffic from Microsoft's MSN.com portal. NBC shut down the three msnbc.com start-ups: Newsvine, Everyblock, and BreakingNews.

Gregory Gittrich, the former editor-in-chief of NBC Local Integrated Media and, before that, the assistant managing editor of the New York Daily News, was named vice president and executive editor of msnbc.com in October 2012, and began to sharply reduce the news staff, pulling back from doing original journalism online. He reported to Vivian Schiller, former chief executive officer of National Public Radio. By 2014, with the msnbc.com staff greatly reduced, Gittrich was at Vocativ, with Schiller soon to join him as a consultant there.

=== 2014 redesign ===
NBCNews.com logo used from 2012 until 2018

On February 5, 2014, a major redesign of NBCNews.com was introduced; NBC News president Deborah Turness explained that the new design is intended to "[tear] down the walls that traditionally have divided TV and digital", by emphasizing multimedia content, original features, and more original reporting from NBC News personalities. The new site uses a responsive design with an infinite scrolling grid of stories, along with new original features such as "Know It All", "The Debunker", and "Show Me".

Reception to the new design was mixed, with criticism directed towards its image-oriented layout rather than a clearer, headline-oriented design; however, the redesign did result in a significant increase in traffic for the site, especially on mobile devices—which saw a 186% increase in traffic. Executive editor Gregory Gittrich admitted that the site's staff members "weren't surprised by the initial feedback because the change was so significant, but that’s why the data and metrics were obviously important." Changes were made to the design to address these shortcomings, including the addition of dedicated areas with a listing of recent headlines, followed by an overhaul of the home page to use a more traditional layout, but still incorporating large images for major headlines.

== Ranking ==
NBCNews.com logo (named as NBC News Online) used from 2018 until 2023

As of May 2009, NBCNews.com had ranked first in U.S. unique users among global news sites for 12 months in a row. In May it had 37.2 million unique users in the U.S. for the month, according to Nielsen/NetRatings. In second place was Yahoo! News with 35.8 million, then CNN with 34.4. At last count, NBCNews.com also served the most online video of any new site, with more than 125 million video streams in May 2008.

September 2014 rankings show NBCNews.com at number 7 among most popular news websites at 63 million unique visitors a month. Less than half of Yahoo! News (175M) and Google News (150M).

== Content ==
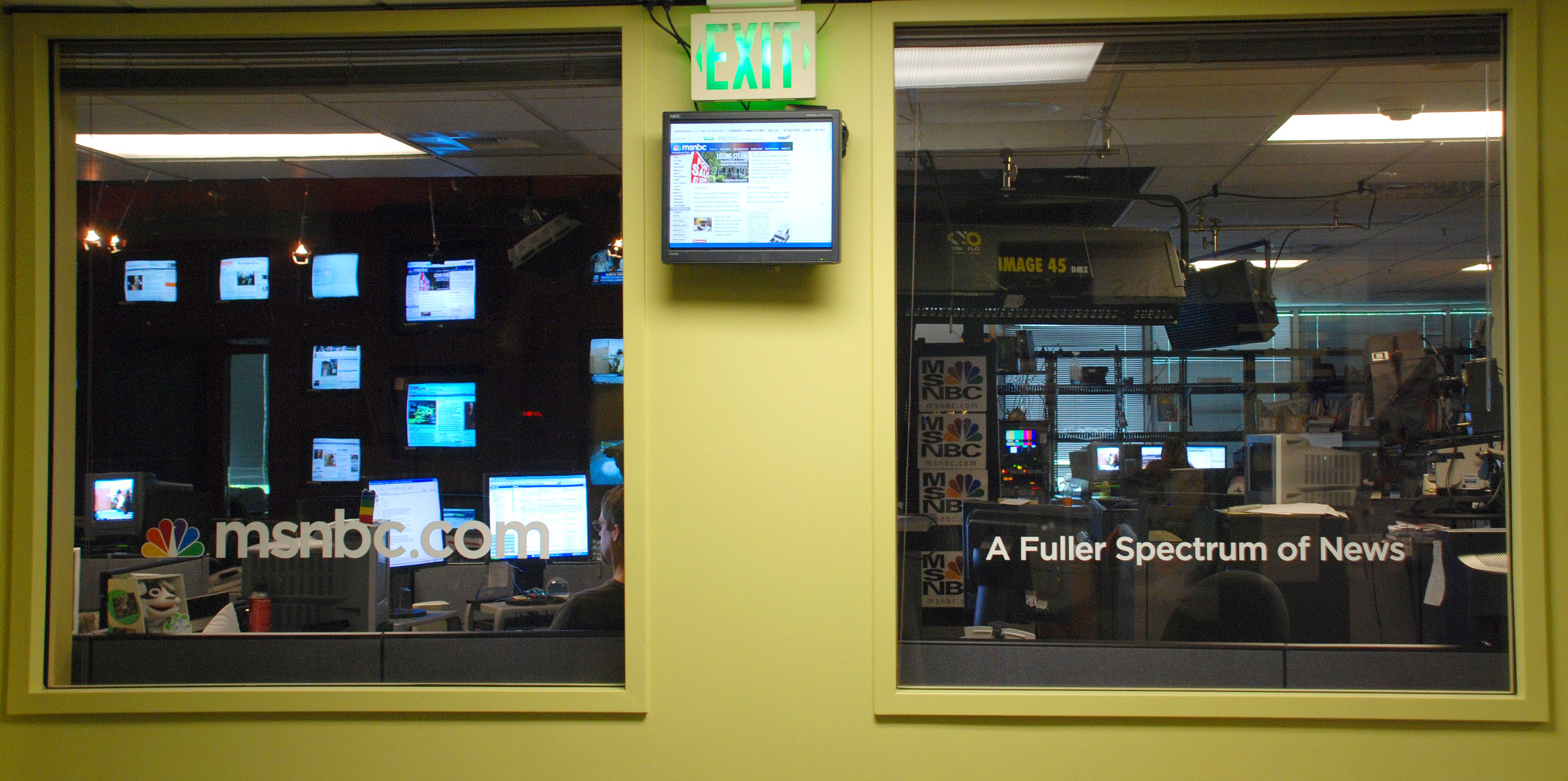
NBCNews.com's main newsroom in Redmond, Washington

NBCNews.com covers national and international news of general interest, using original and wire service reporting, as well as videos from the network's television division, and partners including The New York Times.

A major focus is online content for the NBC News family of programming, including Today, NBC Nightly News, Dateline, Meet the Press, and programming on MSNBC television. This content includes behind the scenes blogs such as "The Daily Nightly", a narrative of the broadcast day and a window into the editorial process at NBC Nightly News; "First Read", analysis of the day's political news from the NBC News Political Unit; "allDAY", allowing viewers to see behind the scenes of Today; and Zeitgeist, a satirical video blog hosted by MSNBC's Willie Geist. Original content from international correspondents and producers is posted on World News on NBCNews.com.

Video is distributed via the MSN Video service. Additionally, the website provides price quotes of companies' shares publicly listed through MSN Money, weather forecasts through Weather.com, RSS feeds, podcasts, and netcasts of the network's broadcasts. Following the introduction of CNN's iReport concept, NBCNews.com also introduced a citizen journalism section titled "First Person". The section allows viewers to upload video, photos and stories in response to suggested topics.

In 2017, NBCNews.com introduced new verticals such as "Mach", which covers science and technology, and "Better", with health and life tips, along with a digital opinion section called "THINK".

== Recognition ==
As the former msnbc.com, the site won several journalism and online publishing awards, including the Society of Professional Journalists award for online investigative reporting, Online News Association's Online Journalism Award for General Excellence and Best Use of Multiple Media; National Press Club's Best Journalism Site; for its coverage of Hurricane Katrina, "Rising from Ruin", and the Best in Business Award from the Society of American Business Editors and Writers and Best Use of Multiple Media.
