= List of companies based in York =

The city of York, England is famous for its history and tourism, but is also the base of various companies which serve both United Kingdom, Europe and other continents.

It is in the top 10 for the number of firms with 1-250 employees and in the top 15 for the number of firms employing over 250 people. The population of York grew at a rate of 1.4 percent per year between 2005 and 2010, increasing from 189,200 to 202,400. It contributed £5,068m to the UK GVA in 2018.

The following list is based partly upon the York Top 100 Businesses 2019 report by York St John University.

== List of companies ==
Company name	Country of origin	Type of base	Notes
ACM Global Central Laboratory	US	European headquarters	Affiliate of Rochester Regional Health in Rochester, New York
Airspeed Ltd.	UK	Headquarters
Anglo-American (motor tricycle)	UK	Headquarters
Animalcare Group	UK	Headquarters	Listed on Alternative Investment Market
Best Western GB	UK	Headquarters
Brierley Groom	UK	Headquarters
Bytemark	UK	Headquarters
Charles Church Developments	UK	Headquarters
Costcutter	UK	Headquarters
East Coast (train operating company)	UK	Headquarters
Gear4music	UK	Headquarters	UK's largest retailer of musical instruments
Great Rail Journeys Partnership	UK	Headquarters	Originally called Mac's Tours
Jarvis plc	UK	Headquarters
Kwik Save	UK	Headquarters
The Landscape Agency	UK	Headquarters
Methuen Publishing	UK	Headquarters
National Express East Coast	UK	Headquarters
Park Leisure	UK	Headquarters	Operates 12 holiday parks in the UK
Pavers Shoes	UK	Headquarters	Established in 1971
Persimmon plc	UK	Headquarters	Headquarters in York, with 30 regional offices
Renaissance Trains	UK	Headquarters
Revolution Software	UK	Headquarters
Rolawn	UK	Headquarters
Rowntree Mackintosh Confectionery	UK	Headquarters
Rowntree's	UK	Headquarters
Shepherd Building Group	UK	Headquarters
Sheppee	UK	Headquarters
B-Sporting	UK	Headquarters	Trades as SportsShows Unlimited
Terry's	UK	Headquarters
TSYS Europe	US	European headquarters	One of top 10 employers in region
Waring Brothers	UK	Headquarters
York Brewery	UK	Headquarters
York Handmade Brick Company	UK	Headquarters
York Pullman	UK	Headquarters

== See also ==
- Lists of companies
- List of companies of the United Kingdom
