= Alaveteli =

Software to help make freedom of information requests

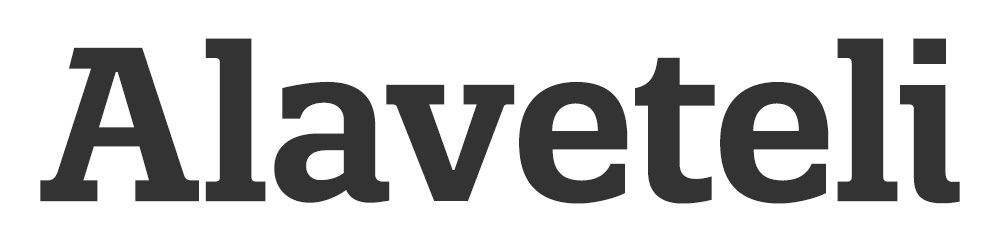

- Alaveteli.org
- Written in: Ruby on Rails
- License: AGPLv3
- Website: alaveteli.org

Alaveteli is free and open source software by mySociety to help citizens write freedom of Information requests and automatically publish any responses.

Alaveteli is described as "a project to create a free, standard, internationalised platform for making Freedom of Information (FOI) requests". Alaveteli is funded by the Open Society Institute and the Hivos Foundation.

It started life as the software running WhatDoTheyKnow, a UK site that publishes responses to FOI requests. The original WhatDoTheyKnow code was written primarily by Francis Irving while working for mySociety. Alaveteli is named after Alaveteli in Finland where Anders Chydenius who was an early campaigner for Freedom of Information worked as a curate. Alaveteli is the name for the software rather than a public facing website or brand.

People who run sites on the Alaveteli platform are also invited to become part of a community, with support and tips shared via a message board, and regular conferences

Alternative free and open source software that are used to operate FOI-request portals include Froide, which FragDenStaat.de in Germany and FragDenStaat.at in Austria are based on, and MuckRock, which is used for MuckRock and FOIA Machine in the United States.

== Sites running Alaveteli ==
- Australia – https://www.righttoknow.org.au
- Belgium – https://transparencia.be/
- Bosnia – https://web.archive.org/web/20170925022926/http://pravodaznam.ba/
- Brazil – http://www.queremossaber.org.br
- Congo (DRC) – http://www.tunabakonzi.org/
- Croatia – https://imamopravoznati.org/
- Czech Republic – https://www.infoprovsechny.cz/
- European Union – https://www.asktheeu.org/
- France – https://madada.fr/
- Hong Kong – https://accessinfo.hk/
- Hungary – https://www.kimittud.hu/
- Israel – https://web.archive.org/web/20140408222116/http://www.askdata.org.il/
- Italy – Chiedi
- Kosovo –
- Liberia – http://infolib.org.lr/
- Macedonia – http://www.slobodenpristap.mk/
- Malaysia – https://web.archive.org/web/20160817111902/http://foi.sinarproject.org/
- Moldova - https://vreauinfo.md
- Nepal – https://asknepal.info/
- New Zealand – http://fyi.org.nz
- Nicaragua – https://derechoapreguntar.org/
- Norway – https://www.mimesbronn.no/
- Paraguay – https://web.archive.org/web/20161016103538/https://www.queremosaber.org.py/
- Romania – https://web.archive.org/web/20161014060621/https://nuvasuparati.info/
- Rwanda – https://sobanukirwa.rw/
- Serbia –
- Spain – http://tuderechoasaber.es
- Sweden – http://fragastaten.se/
- Ukraine – https://dostup.pravda.com.ua/
- United Kingdom – https://www.whatdotheyknow.com/
- Uganda – http://askyourgov.ug/
- Uruguay – http://www.quesabes.org/
