= Pombola =

Free open source software

- Mzalendo, the Kenyan website, running on Pombola
- Initial release: 2013
- Repository: github.com/mysociety/pombola
- License: AGPLv3
- Website: www.mysociety.org/democracy/pombola/

Pombola is free open source software by mySociety for running a parliamentary monitoring website.

Pombola's development was funded by the Omidyar Network to relaunch the Mzalendo site in Kenya.

The IndigoTrust funded roll-out to further countries, with a particular focus on the provision of transparency websites for sub-Saharan Africa.

Among other features, Pombola allows for websites that publish parliamentary transcripts, hold a database of information about politicians, and, using the mySociety software MapIt, can match a user's home location to their constituency.

The site was inspired by TheyWorkForYou – mySociety's UK parliamentary monitoring site.

== Sites running on Pombola ==
- Ghana – Odekro
- Kenya – Mzalendo
- Nigeria – Shine Your Eye
- South Africa – People's Assembly
- Zimbabwe – Kuvakazim
