= UK Citizens Online Democracy =

UK Citizens Online Democracy (or UKCOD) is a registered charity in England and Wales, number 1076346.

At present, UKCOD's main activity is running the mySociety project. mySociety builds websites which give people simple, tangible benefits in the civic and community aspects of their lives. It also aims to teach the public and voluntary sectors, through demonstration, how to use the internet most efficiently to improve lives.

== History ==
=== Early history ===
UKCOD was founded in 1996. This initiative was not associated with any political party although politicians and citizens of all political persuasions were invited to participate, and this has remained true of all UKCOD's projects.

UKCOD’s first project, commissioned by the EU office of the European Parliament, was to host and manage an online discussion on whether Britain should join the European Monetary Union. UKCOD was also heavily involved in research work contributing to the Freedom of Information Act 2000, including the Have Your Say website.

=== More recently ===
UKCOD fell dormant around 1999, and was revived in 2003 by a new generation of trustees and volunteers, many of whom had previously worked together on independent online democratic projects such as Stand.org.uk and FaxYourMP, the predecessor to WriteToThem.

In Autumn 2003, UKCOD started a new project called mySociety which aimed to build more sites in the tradition of FaxYourMP. Over the next three years, mySociety developed and launched a series of projects; see mySociety.

In 2006, UKCOD established a subsidiary trading entity, mySociety Ltd, to manage commercial activity. UKCOD is the sole shareholder of mySociety Ltd and retains any surplus generated by mySociety Ltd.

== Trustees ==
As of 2016, the trustees and directors of UKCOD are:

- Owen Blacker, a technologist in advertising
- James Crabtree, a journalist for the Financial Times
- James Cronin, a technologist and entrepreneur
- Manar Hussain, a technologist
- Stephen King, a partner at the Omidyar Network, a major funder of UKCOD

Owen Blacker and James Cronin are, with mySociety CEO Mark Cridge (and Tom Steinberg before him), also directors of mySociety Ltd.

Former trustees and directors include:

- Amandeep Rehlon, an economist at the Bank of England
- Jeremy Weinstein, a political science academic at Stanford University
