= Vivian Schiller =

American media executive

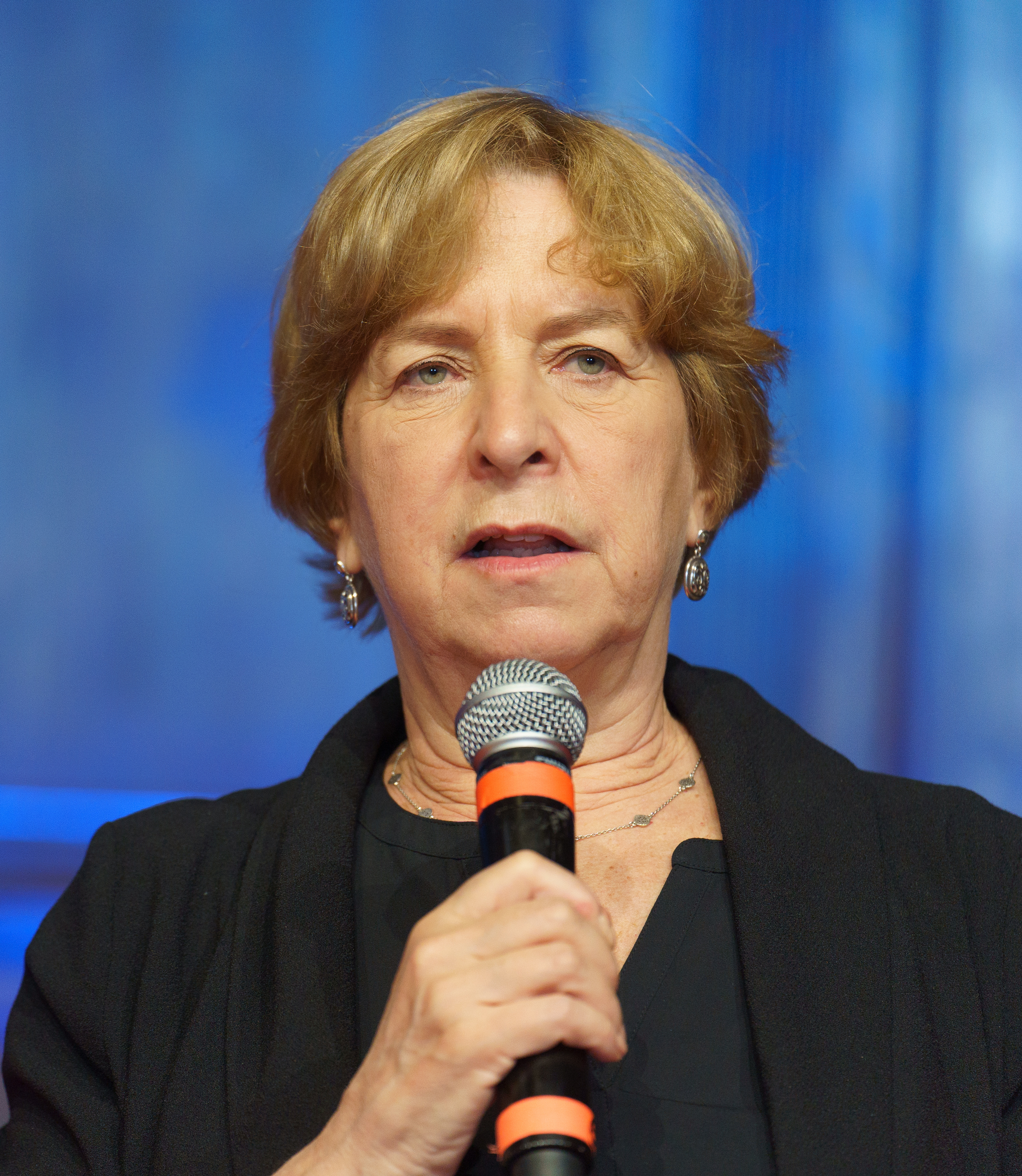
- Schiller at the International Journalism Festival in 2024
- Born: Vivian Luisa Schiller; September 13, 1961 (age 65)
- Education: Cornell University, Middlebury College
- Occupation: Media executive
- Years active: 1988–present
- Known for: Former president and CEO of NPR, Former head of news at Twitter, Former senior vice president at NBC News
- Title: Executive director of Aspen Digital
- Website: www.aspeninstitute.org/people/vivian-schiller/

Vivian Luisa Schiller (born September 13, 1961) is the former president and CEO of National Public Radio, and former head of news and journalism partnerships at Twitter. She is also the former senior vice president and chief digital officer for NBC News, including oversight of NBCNews.com.

== Early life and career ==
Schiller is the daughter of Ronald Schiller, a former editor at Reader's Digest, and Lillian Schiller of Larchmont, New York. She graduated from Cornell University with a Bachelor's degree in Russian studies and Soviet studies, and a Master's degree in Russian from Middlebury College. After finishing her degrees, Schiller worked as tour guide and simultaneous Russian interpreter in the former Soviet Union.

== Turner Broadcasting/CNN ==
In 1988, she joined Turner Broadcasting as a production assistant. During her early years with the company, Schiller worked on documentaries, children's series and network specials for TBS Superstation and TNT including programs such as National Geographic Explorer, David Attenborough's Private life of Plants, Captain Planet the Planters, Tom & Jerry's Kids, The Golden Globe Awards, and specials and series from the BBC, the Audubon Society, and the National Wildlife Federation.

In 1998, Schiller transferred to CNN, where she eventually became head of the documentary unit which produced special and series for CNN-US and CNN International.

Programs during that time included the Cold War, Beneath the Veil, Hank Aaron: Chasing the Dream and more. Schiller's division won multiple awards under her supervision including Emmys, Peabody's, DuPont's and Overseas Press Club Awards.

== Discovery Times Channel ==
In 2002, Schiller was hired by The New York Times and Discovery Communications to develop and run a new joint venture network that would later become the Discovery Times Channel (the current-day Investigation Discovery).

The network commissioned and programmed hundreds of hours of critically acclaimed current affairs and history series and specials including the 10-part series "Off To War” which followed a unit of National Guardsmen from Arkansas during their deployment to Iraq.

== The New York Times ==
In 2006, after The New York Times and Discovery Communications joint venture severed, Schiller joined The New York Times full-time to oversee original web video and then served as general manager of NYTimes.com, then the largest newspaper site in the world. While at The New York Times, Schiller was instrumental in integrating the newspaper and web newsrooms, including embedding web developers with journalists. Under Schiller's watch, The New York Times launched its first mobile presence, Facebook pages and Twitter accounts and grew audiences by double digits.

== NPR ==
In late 2008 Schiller was named president and CEO of NPR. During her tenure, Schiller was widely credited with dramatically upgrading the network's digital presence, significantly expanding its revenue base, and attracting more listeners. She greenlit the network's first investigative unit and launched diversity initiatives that expanded the organizations output of multicultural programming for radio and online. Under her watch, NPR launched its mobile apps and expanded its digital output dramatically.

=== Juan Williams controversy ===
On October 20, 2010, NPR fired political analyst Juan Williams. Initial reports indicated Williams was fired for his comments on Fox News that he gets "nervous" when he sees people in "Muslim garb" boarding a plane. Speaking to the media, Schiller stated Williams was not fired for that particular incident, but for offering his controversial opinions on several occasions, which she deemed a breach of journalistic ethics for an NPR analyst.

Schiller then intensified the existing controversy over Williams' dismissal when she added that Williams should have kept his Muslim comments between himself and "his psychiatrist or his publicist—take your pick." Schiller quickly retracted her own remarks, stating, "I spoke hastily and I apologize to Juan and others for my thoughtless remark."

Williams, appearing soon after on Fox News Channel "The O'Reilly Factor" noted in his own defense that other journalist staff members of NPR had previously voiced their own personal opinions and observations without being reprimanded or terminated. Williams speculated that his termination was occasioned by his frequent appearances on Fox News Channel programs in general, and not by any individual remarks he may have made.

In January 2011, due to concerns with the "speed and handling of the termination process" of Williams, the NPR board decided to deny Schiller a 2010 bonus. At the same time, the board "expressed confidence in Vivian Schiller's leadership going forward."

=== Resignation from NPR ===
In March 2011, Schiller resigned as president and chief executive of National Public Radio amid controversy surrounding the former NPR fundraising executive Ronald Schiller, who is not related to her. Ronald Schiller had been secretly taped in a sting operation by James O'Keefe, where during a private conversation with two men posing as potential donors, he derided the "tea party" movement as a collection of "gun-toting" racists and "fundamentalist Christians" who have "hijacked" the Republican Party. Vivian Schiller's departure was, in part, an attempt to show congressional budget-cutters that NPR could hold itself accountable.

Dave Edwards, then chair of the NPR board of directors, sent the following message to the NPR staff regarding the resignation: "It is with deep regret that I tell you that the NPR Board of Directors has accepted the resignation of Vivian Schiller as President and CEO of NPR, effective immediately. The Board accepted her resignation with understanding, genuine regret, and great respect for her leadership of NPR these past two years." She was succeeded on an interim basis by Joyce Slocum, the senior vice president of legal affairs and general counsel.

== NBC News ==
After her resignation from NPR, Schiller was hired by NBC News president Steve Capus to oversee the acquisition of MSNBC Digital Networks, then a joint venture of Microsoft and NBCUniversal. Schiller led the company's efforts to acquire full ownership of the digital operation, and integrate it into the rest of NBC News in New York under a new name, NBCNews.com. That project culminated in the summer of 2013.

While at NBCNews.com, Schiller oversaw the acquisition of Stringwire, a live videostreaming platform for breaking news, and oversaw the network's education initiative “Education Nation.”

== EveryBlock closing and reopening ==
In February 2013, Schiller closed the NBC News-owned site EveryBlock, saying it "wasn't a strategic fit." Schiller was widely criticized for her handling of the situation, as the site was disabled with no prior warning to site users and providing no access to archives.

Schiller was also criticized for not making a good-faith effort to sell the site before closing it. On the day the site was closed, Schiller said "We looked at various options to keep this going, but none of them were viable." Several days after the site had shut down, she said "we are continuing to look into options very seriously." EveryBlock founder Adrian Holovaty said she "poisoned the pie before trying to sell it."

== Twitter ==
In January 2014, Schiller joined Twitter as head of news with responsibility for expanding the platform's relationships with news organizations. In July 2014, Global Media Head Katie Stanton expanded Schiller's responsibilities to chair of global news for the company, including setting strategy for partnerships with journalists around the world. Schiller left Twitter in October as part of CEO Dick Costolo's ongoing series of strategic pivots and executive changes and ousters.

== Present ==
Since leaving Twitter, Schiller has been working as an independent consultant and advisor to various domestic and international organizations, including to legacy companies as well start-ups such as Vocativ, a data-driven online news provider. In January 2020 Schiller joined the Aspen Institute as Executive Director of Aspen Digital, where she has been actively involved in their Commission on Information Disorder.

In October 2022, Schiller joined the Council for Responsible Social Media project launched by Issue One to address the negative mental, civic, and public health impacts of social media in the United States co-chaired by former House Democratic Caucus Leader Dick Gephardt and former Massachusetts Lieutenant Governor Kerry Healey.

== Affiliations ==
Schiller is a member of the Council on Foreign Relations. She sits on the boards of CUNY Journalism School; the Investigative News Network; Society for Science and the Public; and International Center for Journalism. She was the founding board chair for The News Literary Project.
