= Julian Todd =

- Education: Cambridge University
- Occupation: Computer programmer
- Parent: Janet Todd

Julian Todd is a British computer programmer and activist for freedom of information who works in Liverpool.

He was inventor and co-founder of Public Whip with Francis Irving, and also the affiliated TheyWorkForYou website, a project that parses raw Hansard data to track how members vote in the UK Parliament. Initially risking prosecution for reusing the raw data under Crown copyright, they were later successful in getting permission to use it. He has since extended this concept of parsing political transcripts to the General Assembly and Security Council of the United Nations to establish UNdemocracy.com in 2007.

Todd is a Director of ScraperWiki.

Todd also writes science fiction short stories, and is cited as a major inspiration for the Mundane science fiction movement.

== Publications ==
A machining strategy for toolmaking, A. Flutter and J. Todd doi:10.1016/S0010-4485(00)00136-6

== Game credits ==
- Fat Worm Blows a Sparky – ZX Spectrum, 1985, Durell Software
