= Public Whip =

Internet site analysing the activity of members of the British parliament

The Public Whip is a parliamentary informatics project that analyses and publishes the voting history of MPs in the Parliament of the United Kingdom.

It was developed by Francis Irving and Julian Todd following the 18 March 2003 Parliamentary Approval for the invasion of Iraq as a tool to record which MPs had defied their party's whip long after the information had become effectively inaccessible for reference.

On 1 August 2011 Irving and Todd handed control of the site to a new team.

The project is loosely affiliated to mySociety's TheyWorkForYou with which it shares a large part of the same parliamentary parsing code-base.

In 2014 the OpenAustralia Foundation launched a fork of the project for Australia's federal parliament called They Vote For You .

== Awards and funding ==
In 2004 the Public Whip won the New Statesman New Media Award for "civic renewal".

The site has never received a grant from any funding body and remains entirely paid for by its creators, including server costs and bandwidth.

== Technology ==
Originally the software was written in Perl, and then later rewritten in Python. The main process downloads the daily transcripts from the online Hansard, matches and assigns IDs to the names of MPs, and saves them into XML files. These are later uploaded into a mySQL table and viewed through PHP webpages.

At the end of 2003 the project was extended to read the archive of Parliamentary Written Answers. Following a request from mySociety, the Parliamentary Parser was expanded to include House of Commons and Westminster Hall debates, and finally the House of Lords, which are all more or less in the same format. It is now maintained by them to provide the data to their TheyWorkForYou website.

== Publicity ==
The website has occasionally been cited in newspaper articles, and is sometimes referred to in election material. It has also been used to provide voting analysis to citizens during elections.

== Activism ==
An election quiz which advised voters of which party or incumbent candidate most closely matched their political opinions (according to the Parliamentary vote) was on the site for the 2005 General election and received over 10,000 hits.

In anticipation of preparing a version of it again for the next general election, Julian has distributed leaflets and tried out variations of the site at the 2008 Crewe and Nantwich by-election and the 2008 Glenrothes by-election.

== Creators ==
Francis Irving currently does programming work for mySociety, most recently WhatDoTheyKnow, a site that provides an on-line interface to the Freedom of Information Act 2000.

Julian Todd has extended the concept of parsing transcripts for speeches and votes to the General Assembly and Security Council of the United Nations with a website called undemocracy.com established in 2007. The work was motivated by the discovery of the transcripts on-line during research into the application of United Nations Security Council Resolution 1267 in his home town of Liverpool.
