= Oral democracy =

Form of government

Oral democracy is a talk-based form of government and political system in which citizens of a determined community have the opportunity to deliberate, through direct oral engagement and mass participation, in the civic and political matters of their community. Additionally, oral democracy represents a form of direct democracy, which has the purpose of empowering citizens by creating open spaces that promote an organized process of discussion, debate, and dialogue that aims to reach consensus and to impact policy decision-making. Political institutions based on this idea of direct democracy seek to decrease the possibilities of state capture from elites by holding them accountable, to encourage civic participation and collective action, and to improve the efficiency and adaptability of development interventions and public policy implementation.

Citizen's participation in this type of political system can be found in Indian village assemblies, which are ruled based on the principle of a democratic decentralized structure implemented by the political institute and cabinet of the village, also known as Gram Panchayat. The Gram Sabha is the most distinguished organ and general body of the Gram Panchayat, since it allows citizens to deliberate and decide on the implementation of public policies, local governance, development goals, accountability, and strategic planning of projects for the village.

The term oral democracy was originally presented by Vijayendra Rao and Paromita Sanyal in their 2019 book entitled Oral Democracy: Deliberation in Indian Village Assemblies. It is still considered a new and modern concept that requires further research and theoretical and practical analysis by the academic community.

== Characteristics ==
Oral democracy has three main characteristics: oral engagement, mass participation, and equality.

Rao and Sanyal, the developers of oral democracy as a concept emphasize the relevance and value that the oral element exercises in this form of political organization. The spoken engagement in oral democracy is composed by monologues, which are commonly used citizens and public officials to comment on personal experiences and reflection, and by dialogues, which represent an interactive exchange of ideas and an opportunity to question and challenge the comments and performance of political leaders and public institutions. It is expected that talk- centered participation, such as the one found in oral democracy, becomes more widely recognized as a type of skill and ability that can improve individual quality of life and the quality of collective governance.

Contrary to other forms of direct and deliberative democracy, oral democracy does not excludes or limits the participation of citizens. Oral democracies seek mass participation by creating public spaces and forums where an effective deliberation among citizens and between citizens and state officials can be conducted.

Oral democracies, such as the ones that can be found in the Indian Village Assemblies, aim toward providing citizens the equal right of expressing their ideas and concerns to the state and the equal right to speak and to deliberate and exchange ideas with the other members of the community. Equality also represents an essential element and characteristic of a functioning and modern oral democracy, given that, in the corresponding public forum, such as the Gram Sabha, citizens participating and engaging in the political deliberation and dialogue are considered equals not only among themselves, but also when facing their elected political representatives and public officials. Discursive space and forums in oral democracies helps to create relative communicative equality among objectively and symbolically unequal groups. The main goal and purpose of oral democracy also is to engage in an interactive and participatory process of decision-making and scrutiny on matters that affect the community, such as welfare and development policies and planning.

== Challenges of electoral democracy and the revival of direct democracy ==
Electoral democracy, based on the idea of representation, faces serious challenges. Elite capture of democratic institutions, corruption, patronage, and the questioning of the legitimacy of elections are some of the major threats that democratic systems are facing in the 21st century. This critical social scrutiny and disappointment has led to the revival of what seemed to be a forgotten concept: direct democracy. Different meanings can be provided to explain and define direct democracy. However, political theorists agree that the main characteristic of direct democracy is to give and transfer the power directly to groups of people and citizens to make collective decisions. Direct democracies, which may also be known as pure democracies, may operate through different means, most commonly through assemblies of citizens or referendums and initiatives in which citizens vote on issues instead of for candidates or parties. Direct democracy may be understood as a full-scale system of political institutions. However, in modern societies, direct democracy tends to exist only in specific decision-making institutions within a broader system of representative democracy.

Oral democracy may be confused with deliberative democracy, which is also a subset of direct democracy. Deliberative democracy is defined and conceptualized as a form of direct democracy that claims that political decisions should be the result of a fair and reasonable discussion and debate among citizens. Deliberative democracy differs from traditional democratic theory in that authentic deliberation, not mere voting, is the primary source of legitimacy for the law. However, there are substantial differences between deliberative democracy and oral democracy. Deliberative democracy theory focuses on mutual conversation among citizen-peers outside the purview of the state, and thereby neglects to focus on citizens’ interactions with the state. Political systems based on oral democracy recognize that talking to the state is an important opportunity that has been inaugurated by this talk-centered model of democracy. Because of this, Sanyal and Rao propose the concept of oral democracy as an alternative to deliberative democracy.

== Indian village assemblies, panchayats, and the Gram Sabha ==
Since the constitutional amendment to the constitution in 1992, India has made a commitment to decentralize governance, delegating power to villages and local institutions. Because of this, the Gram Sabha village meetings were born, transforming and strengthening local democracy with an innovative talk-based form of democracy, now called oral democracy, which engages citizens and promotes civic participation. Article 243 (b) of the Indian Constitution defines Gram Sabha as "a body consisting of persons registered in the electoral rolls relating to a village comprised within the area of Panchayat at the village level". In this constitutional definition we can find three essential requisites for citizens to legally participate in the Gram Sabhas: (1) to be 18 years or older, (2) to live in the village in question, and (3) to be included in the electoral rolls for the Panchayat at the village level. The 73rd amendment to the Indian Constitution, which seeks to recognize and protect local governments, grants Gram Sabhas the legitimacy and political power to discuss and legislatively intervene in many important decisions within the ambit of the gram panchayat, or village local government. Also, given that Gram Sabhas are open to the public and often focus on the development and the governance of the village, citizens have the opportunity to manifest their ideas and concerns on a wide range of topics, influencing the implementation of public policies and decision-making, where issues such as the selection of beneficiaries for social programs, the allocation and monitoring of village budgets, and the selection of public goods often rise in the discussions. Decisions made by the Gram Sabha must be respected and cannot be legally annulled by any other organ of the Indian government.

The Gram Sabha represents the general body of the Gram Panchayat. Article 243 (d) of the Indian Constitution defines the Panchayat as "an institution (by whatever name called) of self-government constituted under article 243B, for the rural areas". The Gram Sabha elects the members of the Panchayat, who serve a 5-year term and are accountable to comply with a variety of functions that are stated in the sections 110,111, and 112 of the Tamil Nadu Panchayats Act. Some of the functions the Panchayat has to perform are:

- the construction, repair and maintenance of all village roads;
- the lightning of public roads and public spaces; construction of drains;
- the cleaning of streets and improvement of the sanitary condition of the village; maintenance of burial and burning grounds;
- the maintenance of parks and reading rooms;
- the opening and maintenance and expansion or improvement of elementary schools;
- the opening and maintenance of public markets.

Gram Sabhas have four main features that create the structural foundation for the discursive political culture arising from its presence in the lives of villagers.

1. The Gram Sabha represents an open space for having a communicative engagement where the state solicits citizens’ participation in their local villages, organizing the corresponding forum in a village under the jurisdiction of the gram panchayat.
2. The Gram Sabha is conceived, designed, and implemented as a participatory institution that aims at empowering citizens in the decision-making process and at facilitating public dialogue in governance and development planning in local villages.
3. The Gram Sabha seeks mass participation and creates a public forum for deliberation among citizens and between citizens and the state.
4. The way that the Gram Sabha is designed helps to create relative communicative equality among objectively and symbolically unequal groups.

Today, Indian Gram Sabhas meeting take place at least twice a year all over India, and represent the largest deliberative forum in human history, impacting the lives of 800 million (out of 1.3 billion) people living in two million villages of the India.

Research conducted by Besley, Pande, and Rao found that when Gram Sabhas (local deliberative meetings) are held, governance sharply improves. In addition, research by Fischer concluded that there are also higher levels of public satisfaction with policies that have been developed in a participatory way. Also, participatory governance, according to Touchton, Wampler, and Peixoto, increases the willingness of the citizens to contribute in state's projects by paying taxes.

== Objections ==
Considering that the concept "oral democracy" was coined by Sanyal and Rao in 2019, there are still not explicit critiques for their work. However, given that the characteristics of oral democracy are similar to deliberative democracy, oral democracy may experience the same problems as deliberative democracies. Different political scientists theorists and authors, such as Christopher H. Achen, Larry M. Bartels, and Cammack have stated the systematic problems that deliberative democracies have.

1. The orally gifted and socially popular citizens have an advantage over average citizens, which can lead to the manipulation of the deliberative forum. This may also result in the diminishing of the equal right of speech, which represents a direct attack to a basic principle of direct democracy.
2. Citizens are free to participate or not in the deliberative democracy mechanisms, as well as in the oral democracy forums. This may lead to a biased sample caused by self-selection, where not all the perspectives, opinions, and thoughts are expressed.
