= Open School of Journalism =

Journalism school

The Open School of Journalism is an independent journalism school with branches in Berlin and New York City.

OSJ is a member of the Association for Education in Journalism and Mass Communication (AEJMC), the International Communication Association (ICA, sections Journalism Studies and Public Relations), and the Journalism Education Association (JEA).

== Certificate in Journalism ==
OSJ offers a distance and online program in journalism with a recommended duration of one year which can be extended to two years. The course leads to a Certificate in Journalism according to ISCED Level 4.

The journalism program is authorized by the ZFU, a German state agency for distance education.

== Curriculum ==
The curriculum can be personalized by selecting course modules based on the student's prior experience and occupational objectives.

The course offers modules in the following areas:

- Journalistic working techniques: investigation/research, interviews, writing style for print media, radio, TV, and online media).
- Areas of journalism: Arts journalism, Business journalism, Environmental journalism, Fashion journalism, Foreign affairs journalism, Medical journalism, Political journalism, Science journalism, Sports journalism, etc.
- Genres of Journalism: Advocacy journalism, Citizen journalism, Collaborative journalism, Comics journalism, Database journalism, Gonzo journalism, Immersion journalism, Investigative journalism, Literary journalism, Muckraking, Narrative journalism, New Journalism, Non-profit journalism, Peace journalism, Scientific journalism, Watchdog journalism, etc.
- Public Relations: Press Releases, News Conferences, Crisis PR, etc.
- Practical Workshops: Investigation, News writing, feature writing, opinion writing, Sub-editing, etc.
