= Francis Irving =

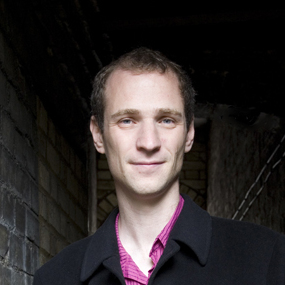
- Francis Irving
- Born: July 1974 (age 52)
- Education: University of Oxford (BA)
- Known for: TortoiseCVS; FixMyStreet; Public Whip; mySociety; WhatDoTheyKnow; ScraperWiki
- Scientific career
- Workplaces: Sensible Code Company Ltd; NC Graphics; Memrise
- Website: www.flourish.org

Francis Irving (born 1974) is a British software engineer, freedom of information activist and former CEO of ScraperWiki.

== Education ==
Irving studied A-levels in Biology, Mathematics, Further Mathematics, Physics and General Studies at high school and was subsequently educated at the University of Oxford. He received a first class degree in mathematics in 1995 as a student at Lincoln College, Oxford.

== Career ==
Irving developed TortoiseCVS. He co-founded Public Whip with Julian Todd and became a developer of the affiliated TheyWorkForYou website, a project which parses raw Hansard data to track how members vote in the UK Parliament. Initially risking prosecution for re-using the raw data which was under crown copyright, the developers of Public Whip were later successful in getting permission to use it. In 2004, Public Whip was recognised in the New Media awards. In 2008, The Daily Telegraph rated TheyWorkforYou 41st in a list of the 101 most useful websites. Irving together with Matthew Somerville wrote the code for FixMyStreet.

Irving was also a senior developer of PledgeBank. He collaborated again with Julian Todd to create 'The Straight Choice', a website (later renamed Election Leaflets) that archives election leaflets.

Irving served as campaign director of the Save Parliament campaign which opposed the Legislative and Regulatory Reform Bill.

Irving was one of two people to suggest the winning idea of a site through which Freedom of Information Act requests could be made in a mySociety competition for ideas for public interest websites to build. He was later to become the main developer of the site which was called WhatDoTheyKnow. Francis has won seven New Statesman awards for websites he has worked on.

Iving has collaborated with Ben Goldacre at the Bennett Institute for Applied Data Science on a European Union (EU) clinical trials tracker and software for tracking retraction in academic publishing. He has previously worked for NC Graphics and Memrise.
