= Vocativ =

American media and technology company

- Website type: News and Information
- Available in: English
- Headquarters: New York City, United States
- Founder: Mati Kochavi
- Key people: Mati Kochavi (founder); Adi Kochavi (CEO); Amit Weiss (VP Operations); Vivian Schiller (chair)
- Website: www.vocativ.com
- Advertising: Yes
- Launched: 2013
- Current status: Inactive

Vocativ was an American media and technology company founded in 2013 by Mati Kochavi. Vocativ used proprietary data-mining technology to explore the deep web in order to discover stories and generate original content. In 2017, the company announced it would focus exclusively on video content and stop publishing written stories.

== Operations and management ==
Vocativ was launched in 2013, with a team of approximately 60 news writers, editors and producers recruited from organizations like NBC News, the Guardian US, The Daily Beast, Storyful, Salon, NPR, CNN and Reuters.

In 2015, Vocativ introduced a decentralized leadership structure with authority divided between the chief operating officer and chief content officer. These leaders are advised by and report to an executive committee. In 2015, Vocativ hired Vivian Schiller to chair its executive committee, reorganize its staff and refine its content and distribution strategies.

As part of its reorganization, Vocativ announced it would focus on several core coverage areas: national security and technology, culture and identity, real-time news and criminal justice. Each beat, led by a senior editor, includes an interdisciplinary team of writers, video producers, data analysts, audience development experts and editors. These teams also create content specifically for social media platforms and video partners, including MSNBC. As of February 2015, Vocativ planned to expand its staff by 25 to 30 percent during the next year. Chief Content Officer Gregory Gittrich, a former executive and editor at NBC News Digital, oversees the company's content, product and data teams.

Vocativ has an office on New York's Seventh Avenue near Penn Station with a fully equipped digital television studio. As of 2013, it had about 60 employees in New York and roughly 20 in Tel Aviv.

Vocativ was planning to leverage its technology, data expertise and original storytelling to monetize content via television deals, content licensing and syndication. The company says it will not sell or license its news-gathering software. As of January 2015, the Vocativ website did not include display advertising.

In June 2017, Vocativ dismissed its entire editorial team, announcing a "strategic shift to focus exclusively on video content" which would be distributed "via social channels and platforms, as well as through partnerships with television networks, OTT players and others".

In August 2019, Vocativ ceased publication the same week that it was reported that Mati Kochavi was involved with a secret arms deal.

== Technology ==
=== Verne ===
Vocativ journalists and analysts work in teams to search and analyze the "deep web" for potential stories using a proprietary data tool adapted from 3i-MIND's OpenMind technology called, "Verne." Vocativ's technology was originally designed for business and then redesigned for the sole purpose of news-gathering. Verne is used by researchers and developers to look through public forums, databases, documents, public records, social media networks, chat rooms, e-commerce sites and more. Similar technology has been used for intelligence gathering. Verne only searches publicly available information and does not access content with any degree of privacy protection.

=== Social Map ===
In March 2015, Vocativ launched Social Map, a visual storytelling platform, powered by Verne which lets users search for location-specific information such as tweets, photos on Instagram and YouTube videos. Social Map allows users to see both raw search results and curated feeds. Social Map was featured at the 2015 SXSW Interactive Festival.

=== VOTR ===
In 2014, Vocativ released a desktop app called VOTR, compared to Tinder, which matched users with U.S. Senate candidates before the 2014 United States elections.

== Notable stories ==
In January 2015, Vocativ was the first news organization to discover, verify and publish the video of the Paris grocery store gunman pledging allegiance to ISIS after the Charlie Hebdo attack. Vocativ also used its technology and expertise to locate the mother of "Boston Bomber" Dzhokhar Tsarnaev and interview her after her son's conviction in April 2015.

In April 2015, Vocativ discovered images, posted by Islamic State supporters, of billboards showing rules for being a "good Muslim woman." The rules mandate a style of burqa, also required by the Taliban, that covers the entire body and face with a mesh screen over the eyes. In an attempt to cast the rules as empowering, the signs sometimes contained slogans such as, "the Muslim woman is queen in her house." Another story, published the same month, determined that 45% of ISIS propaganda focuses on everyday issues of governance such as traffic police, charity work, the legal system, healthcare and agriculture. Stories on ISIS produced by Vocativ have been cited by publications like The Washington Post and The Christian Science Monitor.

Vocativ also produces data-based stories on topics such as Hollywood "blockbuster" revenues, music sales trends, rankings of US cities, the Grammy Awards, the Academy Awards and US presidential speeches.

== Television and video ==
Vocativ produces brief documentaries for Morning Joe and other MSNBC shows as part of a partnership with the NBCUniversal News Group announced in February 2014. The segments included an exclusive report about terrorists recruiting in Tunisia's biggest resort, Gadhafi's guns being sold on Facebook groups in Libya and an exploration of Aleppo when it was declared the most war torn city on the globe. Each segment featured original details, characters and trends discovered using Vocativ's data expertise.

In 2013, Vocativ produced a documentary on Centro Financiero Confinanzas, also known as Torre de David (the Tower of David), a skyscraper turned slum in Caracas, Venezuela. During the banking crisis of 1994, the government took control of the building and it has not been worked on since. The building lacks elevators, proper electricity, running water, balcony railing, windows and even walls in many places. Venezuela's severe housing shortage led to squatters occupying the building in October 2007. Vocativ's team took motorcycles up the stairs to the tenth floor and then walked the rest of the way up to the 23rd floor in order to film.

In November 2015, Showtime announced that it had ordered eight episodes of the new unscripted series Dark Net. The show focuses on some of the darkest aspects of the deep web such as bio-hacking, porn addiction, the webcam sex trade, cyber kidnapping, digital warfare and online cults. Per Showtime, the series explores "a more ominous and disturbing perspective of digitally connected world where our every action is collected and stored." The show was created by Mati Kochavi and is produced by Vocativ in co-operation with Part2 Pictures. It premiered on Showtime on January 21, 2016.

== Awards ==
In 2014, Vocativ won two Telly Awards in the categories of "Internet/Online Video - Political/Commentary" and "Internet/Online Video - News/News Feature" for "Tower of David," a documentary; It won two Webby Awards in 2014 for the same video in the categories of " News & Politics: Individual Episode" and "Best Use of Photography."

Vocativ won an Edward R. Murrow Award in 2015 for its story entitled "China's Abandoned Babies." The site was honored among other online news organizations in the category of "Reporting: Hard News." Vocativ was named an "Official Honoree" at the 2015 Webby Awards for both the stories, "Father. Photographer. Child Pornographer?" and "How A Mafia Drug War Caused A Cancer Spike."

In 2015, Vocativ received an investment from the Knight Prototype Fund which helps 20 honorees each year develop early-stage media and information projects with $35,000 of funding each. Vocativ was honored for its Dataproofer project. Dataproofer is an app that helps journalists and others assess the reliability of a data set before they begin analysis, visualization, or reporting. This award is presented by the John S. and James L. Knight Foundation.

Vocativ reporter Sarah Kaufman won the 2015 Front Page Award for online reporting in the category of "Spot News." Kaufman was honored for her story entitled "Boston Bomber's Mother: My Son Is In 'The Claws Of A Predator.'" The Front Page Awards are presented by the Newswomen's Club of New York to honor excellence in reporting by female journalists.

== Controversies ==
In 2017, journalist Evan Engel publicly resigned from Vocativ, claiming that the publication's management had prevented him from reporting on police abuse.
