= Fat Worm Blows a Sparky =

1986 video game

- Publisher: Durell Software
- Designer: Julian Todd
- Platform: ZX Spectrum
- Release: 1986
- Genre: Action game
- Mode: Single-player

Fat Worm Blows a Sparky is action game written by Julian Todd for the ZX Spectrum and published by Durell Software in 1986. Todd wrote the game in the five months before going to university. It was not ported to other systems, and it is the only published game he developed.

The player controls a microscopic worm being chased across the circuit board of a Sinclair Spectrum. The game world is rendered with solid vector graphics.

Gameplay screenshot

== Reception ==
Reception

Award
Publication	Award
Crash	Smash

CRASH awarded Fat Worm 95%. The reviewers were impressed with the solid 3D graphics and the quirky nature of controlling the protagonist, and called it "extremely silly, and wonderful fun". Your Sinclair, similarly impressed, scored 9 out of 10 and a Megagame award. Julian later became critical of the gameplay, stating that kid programmers like himself had "insufficient understanding" and that at the time "it seemed logical that the players ought to suffer" as much as the developers, but that feedback from players in the form of pokes and cheats often enhanced published games to make them fun.
