= OutWit Hub =

Centre.com.pk this free tools website

- Developer: OutWit Technologies
- Stable release: 9.0.0.8 /
- Operating system: Microsoft Windows, macOS, Linux
- Type: Web scraping, download manager
- License: Proprietary
- Website: outwit.com

OutWit Hub is a Web data extraction software application designed to automatically extract information from online or local resources. It recognizes and grabs links, images, documents, contacts, recurring vocabulary and phrases, rss feeds and converts structured and unstructured data into formatted tables which can be exported to spreadsheets or databases. The first version was released in 2010. The current version (9.0) is available for Windows 10 & Windows 11, Linux and MacOS 10.

The program includes a Mozilla-based browser and a side bar which gives access to a number of views with pre-set extractors. Web pages and textual documents are broken down into their different constituents, presented as tables in these views. The application can navigate through series of links and sequences of search engine results pages to extract information elements, organize them in tables and export them to various formats. The predefined extractors allow to collect structured tables, lists or feeds. Custom scrapers can also be created to extract data from less structured page elements. Regular expressions can be included in scrapers as well as in other parts of the application to define variable recognition markers.

Although OutWit Hub is presented as a tool for non-technical users, the fact that the application doesn't use the document object model structure for its extractions prevents visual "point & grab" data scraping and forces the user who wants to create custom scrapers to define markers in the source code of the page. The advantage of this approach, however, is that it allows a more precise definition of extraction masks than HTML nodes and faster execution, as the document object model tree doesn't need to be rendered by the browser at extraction time.

== Versions ==
A limited free version can be downloaded from the publisher's site and shareware download websites.

== Features ==
- Recognition and extraction of links, email addresses, structured & non-structured data, RSS news
- Extraction & download of images and documents
- Extraction of text, with dictionary of words & groups of words by frequency
- Automated browsing with user-defined Web exploration rules
- Automatic query and URL generation by patterns
- Directories of links & queries
- Custom scrapers
- Macro automation
- Periodical job execution

== Advanced features ==
An Enterprise edition of the application includes advanced extraction and automation features for specific or large volume extractions, sending series of automatically generated HTTP or POST queries and uploading scraped data to FTP servers.

== Browser extensions ==
=== Firefox ===
OutWit Hub was a Firefox extension as late as 2017 but has since been discontinued.

== See also ==
- Data driven journalism
- Web scraping

== Similar Tools ==
- yahoo pipes
- Automation Anywhere - Web extractor and automation system
