= Data journalism =

Journalistic process

Data journalism or data-driven journalism (DDJ) is journalism based on the filtering and analysis of large data sets for the purpose of creating or elevating a news story.

Data journalism reflects the increased role of numerical data in the production and distribution of information in the digital era. It involves a blending of journalism with other fields such as data visualization, computer science, and statistics, "an overlapping set of competencies drawn from disparate fields".

Data journalism has been widely used to unite several concepts and link them to journalism. Some see these as levels or stages leading from the simpler to the more complex uses of new technologies in the journalistic process.

Many data-driven stories begin with newly available resources such as open source software, open access publishing and open data, while others are products of public records requests or leaked materials. This approach to journalism builds on older practices, most notably on computer-assisted reporting (CAR), a label used mainly in the US for decades. Other labels for partially similar approaches are "precision journalism", based on a book by Philipp Meyer, published in 1972, where he advocated the use of techniques from social sciences in researching stories. Data-driven journalism has a wider approach. At the core the process builds on the growing availability of open data that is freely available online and analyzed with open source tools. Data-driven journalism strives to reach new levels of service for the public, helping the general public or specific groups or individuals to understand patterns and make decisions based on the findings. As such, data-driven journalism might help to put journalists into a role relevant for society in a new way.

Telling stories based on the data is the primary goal. The findings from data can be transformed into any form of journalistic writing. Visualizations can be used to create a clear understanding of a complex situation. Furthermore, elements of storytelling can be used to illustrate what the findings actually mean, from the perspective of someone who is affected by a development. This connection between data and story can be viewed as a "new arc" trying to span the gap between developments that are relevant, but poorly understood, to a story that is verifiable, trustworthy, relevant and easy to remember.

== Definitions ==
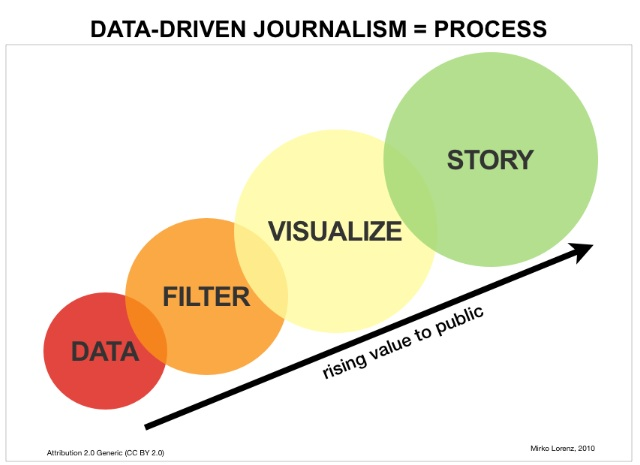
The data-driven journalism process

Veglis and Bratsas defined data journalism as "the process of extracting useful information from data, writing articles based on the information, and embedding visualizations (interacting in some cases) in the articles that help readers understand the significance of the story or allow them to pinpoint data that relate to them"

Antonopoulos and Karyotakis define the practice of data journalism as "a way of enhancing reporting and news writing with the use and examination of statistics in order to provide a deeper insight into a news story and to highlight relevant data. One trend in the digital era of journalism has been to disseminate information to the public via interactive online content through data visualization tools such as tables, graphs, maps, infographics, microsites, and visual worlds. The in-depth examination of such data sets can lead to more concrete results and observations regarding timely topics of interest. In addition, data journalism may reveal hidden issues that seemingly were not a priority in the news coverage".

According to architect and multimedia journalist Mirko Lorenz, data-driven journalism is primarily a workflow that consists of the following elements: digging deep into data by scraping, cleansing and structuring it, filtering by mining for specific information, visualizing and making a story. This process can be extended to provide results that cater to individual interests and the broader public.

Data journalism trainer and writer Paul Bradshaw describes the process of data-driven journalism in a similar manner: data must be found, which may require specialized skills like MySQL or Python, then interrogated, for which understanding of jargon and statistics is necessary, and finally visualized and mashed with the aid of open-source tools.

A more results-driven definition comes from data reporter and web strategist Henk van Ess (2012). "Data-driven journalism enables reporters to tell untold stories, find new angles or complete stories via a workflow of finding, processing and presenting significant amounts of data (in any given form) with or without open tools." Van Ess claims that some of the data-driven workflow leads to products that "are not in orbit with the laws of good story telling" because the result emphases on showing the problem, not explaining the problem. "A good data driven production has different layers. It allows you to find personalized that are only important for you, by drilling down to relevant but also enables you to zoom out to get the big picture."

In 2013, Van Ess came with a shorter definition in that doesn't involve visualisation per se:"Data journalism can be based on any data that has to be processed first with tools before a relevant story is possible. It doesn't include visualization per se."

However, one of the problems for defining data journalism is that many definitions are not clear enough and focus on describing the computational methods of optimization, analysis, and visualization of information.

== Emergence as a concept ==
The term "data journalism" was coined by political commentator Ben Wattenberg through his work starting in the mid-1960s layering narrative with statistics to support the theory that the United States had entered a golden age.

One of the earliest examples of using computers with journalism dates back to a 1952 endeavor by CBS to use a mainframe computer to predict the outcome of the presidential election, but it wasn't until 1967 that using computers for data analysis began to be more widely adopted.

Working for the Detroit Free Press at the time, Philip Meyer used a mainframe to improve reporting on the riots spreading throughout the city. With a new precedent set for data analysis in journalism, Meyer collaborated with Donald Barlett and James Steele to look at patterns with conviction sentencings in Philadelphia during the 1970s. Meyer later wrote a book titled Precision Journalism that advocated the use of these techniques for combining data analysis into journalism.

Toward the end of the 1980s, significant events began to occur that helped to formally organize the field of computer assisted reporting. Investigative reporter Bill Dedman of The Atlanta Journal-Constitution won a Pulitzer Prize in 1989 for The Color of Money, his 1988 series of stories using CAR techniques to analyze racial discrimination by banks and other mortgage lenders in middle-income black neighborhoods. The National Institute for Computer Assisted Reporting (NICAR) was formed at the Missouri School of Journalism in collaboration with the Investigative Reporters and Editors (IRE). The first conference dedicated to CAR was organized by NICAR in conjunction with James Brown at Indiana University and held in 1990. The NICAR conferences have been held annually since and is now the single largest gathering of data journalists.

Although data journalism has been used informally by practitioners of computer-assisted reporting for decades, the first recorded use by a major news organization is The Guardian, which launched its Datablog in March 2009. And although the paternity of the term is disputed, it is widely used since Wikileaks' Afghan War documents leak in July, 2010.

The Guardian's coverage of the war logs took advantage of free data visualization tools such as Google Fusion Tables, another common aspect of data journalism. Facts are Sacred by The Guardian's Datablog editor Simon Rogers describes data journalism like this:

"Comment is free," wrote Guardian editor CP Scott in 1921, "but facts are sacred". Ninety years later, publishing those sacred facts has become a new type of journalism in itself: data journalism. And it is rapidly becoming part of the establishment.

Investigative data journalism combines the field of data journalism with investigative reporting. An example of investigative data journalism is the research of large amounts of textual or financial data. Investigative data journalism also can relate to the field of big data analytics for the processing of large data sets.

Since the introduction of the concept a number of media companies have created "data teams" which develop visualizations for newsrooms. Most notable are teams e.g. at Reuters, Pro Publica, and La Nacion (Argentina). In Europe, The Guardian and Berliner Morgenpost have very productive teams, as well as public broadcasters.

As projects like the MP expense scandal (2009) and the 2013 release of the "offshore leaks" demonstrate, data-driven journalism can assume an investigative role, dealing with "not-so open" a.k.a. secret data on occasion.

The annual Data Journalism Awards recognize outstanding reporting in the field of data journalism, and numerous Pulitzer Prizes in recent years have been awarded to data-driven storytelling, including the 2018 Pulitzer Prize in International Reporting and the 2017 Pulitzer Prize in Public Service

== Taxonomies ==
Many scholars have proposed different taxonomies of data journalism projects. Megan Knight suggested a taxonomy that is based on the level of interpretations and analysis that is needed in order to produce a data journalism project. Specifically the taxonomy included: number pullquote, static map, list and timelines, table, graphs and charts, dynamic map, textual analysis, and info graphics.

Simon Rogers proposed five types of data journalism projects: By just the facts, Data-based news stories, Local data telling stories, Analysis and background, and Deep dive investigations. Martha Kang discussed seven types of data stories, namely: Narrate change over time, Start big and drill down, Start small and zoom out, Highlight contrasts, Explore the intersection, Dissect the factors, and Profile the outliers.

Veglis and Bratsas proposed another taxonomy that is based on the method of presenting the information to the audience. Their taxonomy had an hierarchical structure and included the following types: data journalism articles with just numbers, with tables, and with visualizations (interactive and non-interactive). Also in the case of stories with interactive visualizations they proposed 3 distinct types, namely transmissional, consultational, and conversational.

== Data quality ==
In many investigations the data that can be found might have omissions or is misleading. As one layer of data-driven journalism a critical examination of the data quality is important. In other cases the data might not be public or is not in the right format for further analysis, e.g. is only available in a PDF. Here the process of data-driven journalism can turn into stories about data quality or refusals to provide the data by institutions. As the practice as a whole is in early development steps, examinations of data sources, data sets, data quality and data format are therefore an equally important part of this work.

=== Data-driven journalism and the value of trust ===
Based on the perspective of looking deeper into facts and drivers of events, there is a suggested change in media strategies: In this view the idea is to move "from attention to trust". The creation of attention, which has been a pillar of media business models has lost its relevance because reports of new events are often faster distributed via new platforms such as Twitter than through traditional media channels. On the other hand, trust can be understood as a scarce resource. While distributing information is much easier and faster via the web, the abundance of offerings creates costs to verify and check the content of any story create an opportunity. The view to transform media companies into trusted data hubs has been described in an article cross-published in February 2011 on Owni.eu and Nieman Lab.

== Process of data-driven journalism ==
The process to transform raw data into stories is akin to a refinement and transformation. The main goal is to extract information recipients can act upon. The task of a data journalist is to extract what is hidden. This approach can be applied to almost any context, such as finances, health, environment or other areas of public interest.

=== Inverted pyramid of data journalism ===
In 2011, Paul Bradshaw introduced a model he called "The Inverted Pyramid of Data Journalism".

=== Steps of the process ===
In order to achieve this, the process should be split up into several steps. While the steps leading to results can differ, a basic distinction can be made by looking at six phases:

1. Find: Searching for data on the web
2. Clean: Process to filter and transform data, preparation for visualization
3. Visualize: Displaying the pattern, either as a static or animated visual
4. Publish: Integrating the visuals, attaching data to stories
5. Distribute: Enabling access on a variety of devices, such as the web, tablets and mobile
6. Measure: Tracking usage of data stories over time and across the spectrum of uses.

=== Description of the steps ===
==== Finding data ====
Data can be obtained directly from governmental databases such as data.gov, data.gov.uk and World Bank Data API but also by placing Freedom of Information requests to government agencies; some requests are made and aggregated on websites like the UK's What Do They Know. While there is a worldwide trend towards opening data, there are national differences as to what extent that information is freely available in usable formats. If the data is in a webpage, scrapers are used to generate a spreadsheet. Examples of scrapers are: WebScraper, Import.io, QuickCode, OutWit Hub and Needlebase (retired in 2012). In other cases OCR software can be used to get data from PDFs.

Data can also be created by the public through crowd sourcing, as shown in March 2012 at the Datajournalism Conference in Hamburg by Henk van Ess.

==== Cleaning data ====
Usually data is not in a format that is easy to visualize. Examples are that there are too many data points or that the rows and columns need to be sorted differently. Another issue is that once investigated many datasets need to be cleaned, structured and transformed. Various tools like OpenRefine (open source), Data Wrangler and Google Spreadsheets allow uploading, extracting or formatting data.

==== Visualizing data ====
To visualize data in the form of graphs and charts, applications such as Many Eyes or Tableau Public are available. Yahoo! Pipes and Open Heat Map are examples of tools that enable the creation of maps based on data spreadsheets. The number of options and platforms is expanding. Some new offerings provide options to search, display and embed data, an example being Timetric.

To create meaningful and relevant visualizations, journalists use a growing number of tools. There are by now, several descriptions what to look for and how to do it. Most notable published articles are:

- Joel Gunter: "#ijf11: Lessons in data journalism from the New York Times"
- Steve Myers: "Using Data Visualization as a Reporting Tool Can Reveal Story’s Shape", including a link to a tutorial by Sarah Cohen

As of 2011, the use of HTML 5 libraries using the canvas tag is gaining in popularity. There are numerous libraries enabling to graph data in a growing variety of forms. One example is RGraph. As of 2011 there is a growing list of JavaScript libraries allowing to visualize data.

==== Publishing data story ====
There are different options to publish data and visualizations. A basic approach is to attach the data to single stories, similar to embedding web videos. More advanced concepts allow to create single dossiers, e.g. to display a number of visualizations, articles and links to the data on one page. Often such specials have to be coded individually, as many Content Management Systems are designed to display single posts based on the date of publication.

==== Distributing data ====
Providing access to existing data is another phase, which is gaining importance. Think of the sites as "marketplaces" (commercial or not), where datasets can be found easily by others. Especially of the insights for an article where gained from Open Data, journalists should provide a link to the data they used for others to investigate (potentially starting another cycle of interrogation, leading to new insights).

Providing access to data and enabling groups to discuss what information could be extracted is the main idea behind Buzzdata, a site using the concepts of social media such as sharing and following to create a community for data investigations.

Other platforms (which can be used both to gather or to distribute data):

- Help Me Investigate (created by Paul Bradshaw)
- Timetric
- ScraperWiki

==== Measuring the impact of data stories ====
A final step of the process is to measure how often a dataset or visualization is viewed.

In the context of data-driven journalism, the extent of such tracking, such as collecting user data or any other information that could be used for marketing reasons or other uses beyond the control of the user, should be viewed as problematic. One newer, non-intrusive option to measure usage is a lightweight tracker called PixelPing. The tracker is the result of a project by ProPublica and DocumentCloud. There is a corresponding service to collect the data. The software is open source and can be downloaded via GitHub.

== Examples ==
There is a growing list of examples how data-driven journalism can be applied. The Guardian, one of the pioneering media companies in this space (see "Data journalism at the Guardian: what is it and how do we do it?"), has compiled an extensive list of data stories, see: "All of our data journalism in one spreadsheet".

Other prominent uses of data-driven journalism are related to the release by whistle-blower organization WikiLeaks of the Afghan War Diary, a compendium of 91,000 secret military reports covering the war in Afghanistan from 2004 to 2010. Three global broadsheets, namely The Guardian, The New York Times and Der Spiegel, dedicated extensive sections to the documents; The Guardian's reporting included an interactive map pointing out the type, location and casualties caused by 16,000 IED attacks, The New York Times published a selection of reports that permits rolling over underlined text to reveal explanations of military terms, while Der Spiegel provided hybrid visualizations (containing both graphs and maps) on topics like the number deaths related to insurgent bomb attacks. For the Iraq War logs release, The Guardian used Google Fusion Tables to create an interactive map of every incident where someone died, a technique it used again in the England riots of 2011.

== See also ==
- Automated journalism
- Database journalism
- Computational journalism
- Open science data
- Open source
- Open knowledge
- Freedom of information legislation
- Information visualization
