= Nedervetil =

Coordinates: 63°42′N 23°20′E

Nedervetil Alaveteli
- Former municipality
- Coat of arms

- Country: Finland
- Province: Vaasa
- Region: Ostrobothnia
- Merged into Kronoby: 1969; 57 years ago

Area
  - Land: 171.8 km^{2} (66.3 sq mi)

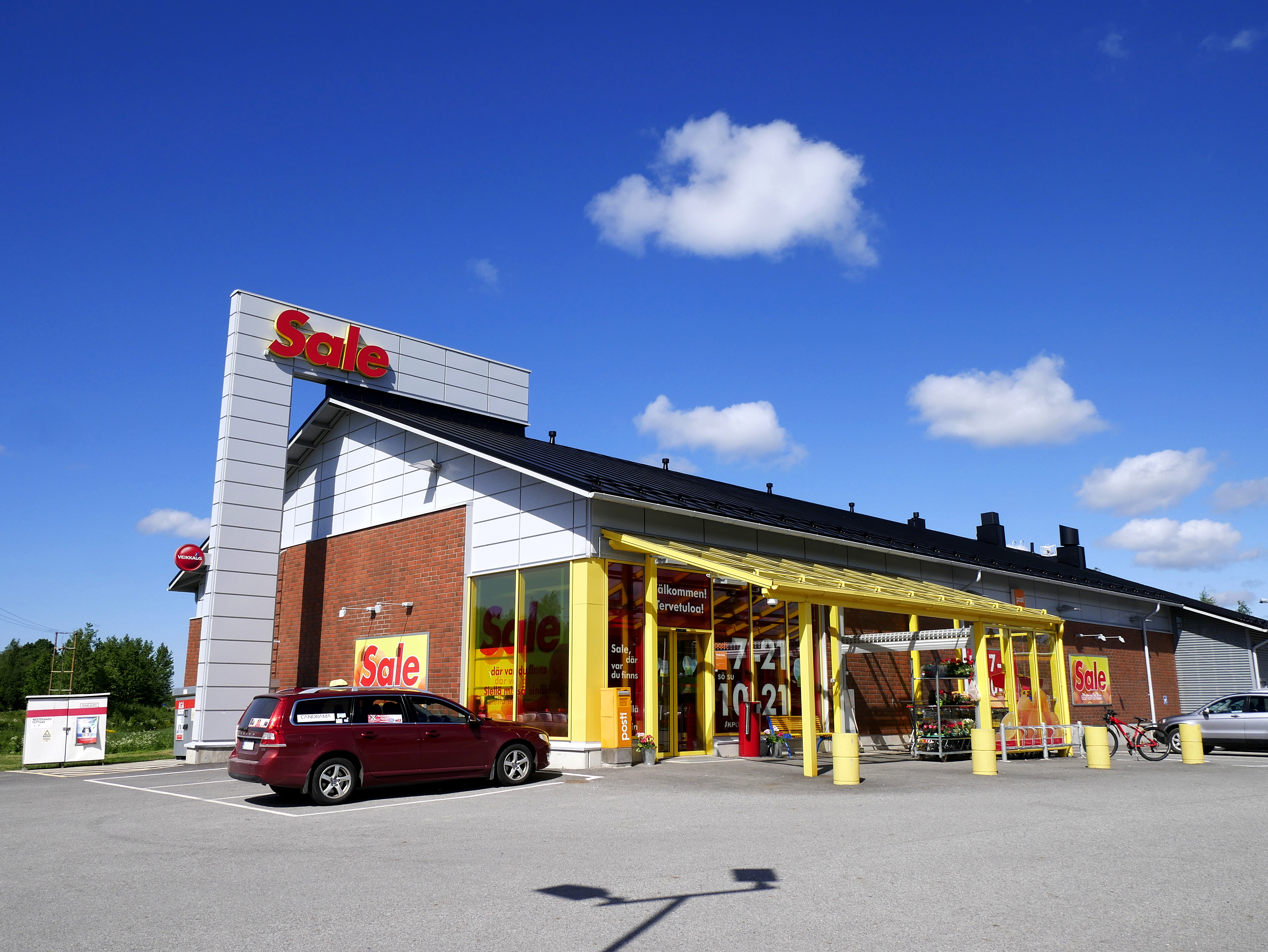
Sale grocery store in Nedervetil

Nedervetil (Finnish: Alaveteli) is a former municipality in Ostrobothnia, Finland. It is now part of Kronoby municipality.

It has given its Finnish name to Alaveteli, open source software to help in Freedom of Information enquiries, because Anders Chydenius (1729–1803), an early proponent of freedom of the press, lived and worked as a curate in this area for some years.
