= Juan Williams =

American journalist (born 1954)

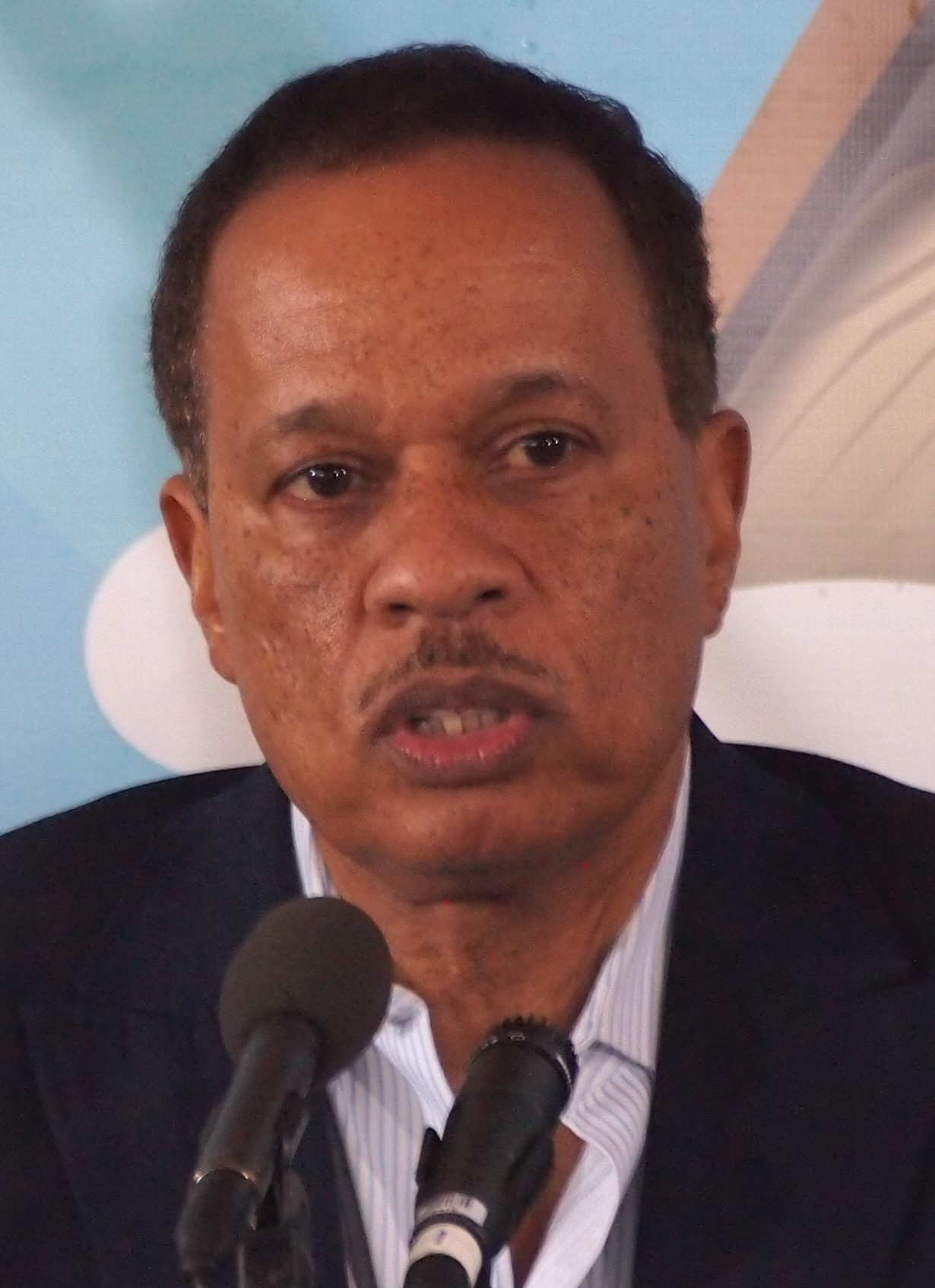
- Williams in 2016
- Born: Juan Antonio Williams; April 10, 1954 (age 72); Colón, Panama
- Education: Haverford College (BA)
- Occupations: Author, journalist
- Notable credits: CNN Crossfire; Fox News Sunday; National Public Radio; The Five; Fox News Special Report with Bret Baier; The O'Reilly Factor
- Political party: Democratic
- Spouse: Susan Delise (m. 1978)
- Children: 3
- Family: Christopher Williams (nephew)

Juan Antonio Williams (born April 10, 1954) is a Panamanian-American journalist and political analyst for Fox News Channel. He writes for several newspapers, including The Washington Post, The New York Times, and The Wall Street Journal, and has been published in magazines such as The Atlantic and Time. Williams has worked as an editorial writer, an op-ed columnist, a White House correspondent, and a national correspondent. He is a registered Democrat.

With the Eyes on the Prize production team, Williams is the author of Eyes on the Prize: America's Civil Rights Years, 1954–1965 (1987), a companion to the documentary series of the same name about the civil rights movement; Thurgood Marshall: American Revolutionary (2000), a biography of Thurgood Marshall, the first black American to serve on the Supreme Court; and Enough (2006), which was inspired by a Bill Cosby speech at an NAACP gala and deals with Williams' critique of black leaders in America. Williams has received an Emmy Award and critical praise for his television documentary work and he has won awards for investigative journalism and for his opinion columns. He has been at Fox News since 1997.

== Early life and education ==
Williams was born in Colón, Panama, on April 10, 1954, to Alma Géraldine and Rogelio L. Williams. Williams' father was from Jamaica and his mother was from Panama. His family spoke English and Spanish. In a 2018 op-ed, Williams stated he had legally emigrated from Panama to the United States aboard a banana boat with his mother and his two siblings when he was four years of age. The family briefly lived in Pleasantville, New Jersey, before settling in Brooklyn, New York. Williams received a scholarship to attend Oakwood Friends School, a Quaker school in Poughkeepsie, New York. While at Oakwood, he was elected "student clerk" for his senior year, was editor of the school newspaper, and played sports. After graduating from Oakwood in 1972, Williams attended Haverford College, graduating with a bachelor's degree in philosophy in 1976.

== Career ==
=== The Washington Post ===
Williams wrote for The Washington Post for 23 years.

In 1991 Williams wrote a column defending Supreme Court nominee Clarence Thomas against sexual misconduct allegations made by Anita Hill against Thomas. Shortly thereafter it was revealed several female employees of the Post had filed sexual harassment charges against Williams. The paper took disciplinary action against Williams and published an apology by him. On November 2, 1991, Williams wrote: "It pained me to learn during the investigation that I had offended some of you. I have said so repeatedly in the last few weeks, and repeat here: some of my verbal conduct was wrong, I now know that, and I extend my sincerest apology to those whom I offended."

=== National Public Radio ===
Williams joined NPR in 2000 as host of the daily afternoon talk show Talk of the Nation. He then served as senior national correspondent for NPR. In 2009, NPR's president and CEO Vivian Schiller requested Fox News stop identifying him as an NPR host after Williams commented on The O'Reilly Factor: "Michelle Obama, you know, she's got this Stokely Carmichael in a designer dress thing going. If she starts talking...her instinct is to start with this blame America, you know, I'm the victim. If that stuff starts coming out, people will go bananas and she'll go from being the new Jackie O to being something of an albatross". NPR Ombudsman Alicia Shepard maintained that: "Williams tends to speak one way on NPR and another on Fox."

NPR terminated his contract on Wednesday, October 20, 2010, two days after he made remarks on The O'Reilly Factor. He had commented, "Look, Bill, I'm not a bigot. You know the kind of books I've written about the civil rights movement in this country. But when I get on the plane, I got to tell you, if I see people who are in Muslim garb and I think, you know, they are identifying themselves first and foremost as Muslims, I get worried. I get nervous." According to NPR, the remarks were "inconsistent with our editorial standards and practices, and undermined his credibility as a news analyst with NPR." As to the reason for the termination of Williams' contract, NPR's president and CEO Vivian Schiller offered the following comment: "News analysts may not take personal public positions on controversial issues; doing so undermines their credibility as analysts..." On October 21, 2010, Schiller told an audience at the Atlanta Press Club that Williams' feelings about Muslims should be between him and "his psychiatrist or his publicist—take your pick." Schiller later apologized stating, "I spoke hastily and I apologize to Juan and others for my thoughtless remark."

Some observers have questioned whether NPR actually fired Williams for making the comments on Fox News, as opposed to making them in another forum. William Saletan of Slate.com compared the Williams situation to that of Shirley Sherrod, saying that both Sherrod and Williams had their words taken out of context in a way that made them appear racist and led to the loss of their jobs, except that Williams was victimized by liberals, rather than conservatives as in Sherrod's case. Saletan said that while Williams' confessed fears of Muslims were "unsettling", the context was Williams' argument that such fears should not be used to curtail the rights of Muslims or anyone else, and that Williams consistently argued that Muslims in general should not be blamed for the terrorist activities of Muslim extremists. NPR has been criticized by Williams and others for practicing a double standard in the firing, compared to their not firing Cokie Roberts, Nina Totenberg and other NPR reporters and analysts for their opinionated statements.

=== Fox News Channel ===
Williams has been a Fox News Contributor since 1997. He has appeared on Special Report with Bret Baier, FOX News Sunday with Chris Wallace and was a regular co-host of The Five, until announcing on 5 May 2021, that he would leave the New-York office to work in the D.C. office in order to spend more time with his family in D.C.. He also appeared on The O'Reilly Factor and occasionally served as a guest host in O'Reilly's absence. After NPR announced his termination from their network in October 2010, Fox News offered him a new $2 million (a "considerable" raise) three-year contract and an expanded role at their network that included a regular guest-host role Friday nights on The O'Reilly Factor.

Following his firing from NPR, Williams appeared on The O'Reilly Factor and discussed his thoughts on how his role at Fox played into NPR's decision: "I don't fit in their box. I'm not a predictable black liberal. You [O'Reilly] were exactly right when you said you know what this comes down to. They were looking for a reason to get rid of me because I'm appearing on Fox News. They don't want me talking to you." On December 9, 2016, on Fox Business Channel, Stuart Varney asked Williams, "Do you see yourself ever joining the Republican Party?" Williams answered, "I have two sons in the Republican Party, so, yes."

On February 18, 2022, Williams wrote an opinion piece for Fox News entitled “Rap and drill music is part of America's racial problem”. In it, he stated that the popularity of rap and drill music causes increased criminality among low-income black men. A 2020 study found no causal relationship between drill music and real-life violence when compared to police-recorded violent crime data in London.

=== Television ===
Williams is the recipient of an Emmy Award for his work in television documentary writing and has earned critical praise for a series of television documentaries including Politics: The New Black Power, A. Philip Randolph: For Jobs and Freedom, Civil Rights and The Press, Riot to Recovery, and Dying for Healthcare.

Williams' 1988 book, Eyes on the Prize: America's Civil Rights Years, 1954–65, was written with the Blackside production team as a companion to the first season of the PBS series Eyes on the Prize. His 2003 book, This Far by Faith, is also a companion to a PBS series.

Williams is a contributor to a number of national magazines, including Fortune, The New Republic, The Atlantic Monthly, Ebony magazine, TIME and GQ and frequents a wide range of television programs including ABC's Nightline, Washington Week on PBS, and The Oprah Winfrey Show.

Williams spoke at the Smithsonian's celebration of the 50th anniversary of the Supreme Court's Brown v. Board of Education decision, which ended legal segregation in public schools, and was selected by the United States Census Bureau as moderator of its first program beginning its 2010 effort. He has received honorary doctorates from Lafayette College, Wittenberg University, and Long Island University, among other institutions.

=== Criticism ===
In October 1991 Williams was accused of sexual harassment by four female Washington Post colleagues. His colleagues recalled his making sexually suggestive comments about them. Williams published an article apologizing for his comments.

A February 2013 column written by Williams for The Hill was found to contain content that had been plagiarized. Williams asserted that a researcher was responsible for the plagiarism, and that he himself had been unaware of it.

== Personal life ==
Williams married Susan Delise in July 1978. They are the parents of one daughter, Rae, and two sons, Antonio ("Tony") and Raphael ("Raffi"). Tony, who was a Senate page and intern for GOP Senator Strom Thurmond from 1996 to 1997, was a speechwriter and legislative correspondent for Republican Senator Norm Coleman from 2004 to 2006; in 2006, Tony ran unsuccessfully for a seat on the Council of the District of Columbia, losing to Tommy Wells. The younger son, Raffi, studied anthropology and played lacrosse at Haverford College, his father's alma mater in Pennsylvania. He has worked for the House Rules Committee and as the communications director for Michigan Republican Dan Benishek's successful 2012 congressional campaign, and was a deputy press secretary for the Republican National Committee. Raffi served as press secretary to former Secretary of Housing and Urban Development Ben Carson.

Williams is the grandfather of one boy, Elias, and two twin girls, Pepper and Wesley.

Williams has described himself as "a black guy with a Hispanic name", and identifies as Afro-Panamanian. He is an Episcopalian.

Williams has been active on the Haverford College Board of Managers, in the Aspen Institute Communications and Society Program, and in the Washington Journalism Center. He sits on the board of directors of the New York Civil Rights Coalition.

== Awards ==
Williams has received many awards, including honorary doctorates from Haverford College and State University of New York.

== See also ==
- List of Afro-Latinos
- New Yorkers in journalism

== Selected bibliography ==
External videos
- Interview with Williams on Eyes on the Prize, February 3, 1987, C-SPAN
- Presentation by Williams on Thurgood Marshall: American Revolutionary, July 14, 1998, C-SPAN
- Booknotes interview with Williams on Thurgood Marshall, October 11, 1998, C-SPAN
- Discussion with Williams on Thurgood Marshall, June 3, 1999, C-SPAN
- Presentation by Williams on This Far by Faith, October 4, 2003, C-SPAN
- Presentation by Williams on My Soul Looks Back in Wonder, October 9, 2004, C-SPAN
- After Words interview with Williams on Enough, August 12, 2006, C-SPAN
- Book party for Muzzled, July 19, 2011, C-SPAN
- Q&A interview with Williams on Muzzled, July 31, 2011, C-SPAN
- Interview with Williams on Muzzled, October 22, 2011, C-SPAN
- Washington Journal interview with Williams on We the People, April 17, 2016, C-SPAN
- Presentation by Williams on We the People, May 21, 2016, C-SPAN
- Washington Journal interview with Williams on What the Hell Do You Have to Lose?, October 1, 2018, C-SPAN
- Presentation by Williams on What the Hell Do You Have to Lose?, October 5, 2018, C-SPAN
- Washington Journal interview with Williams on What the Hell Do You Have to Lose?, December 25, 2018, C-SPAN

- Eyes on the Prize: America's Civil Rights Years, 1954–1965. Penguin (Non-Classics). 1988. ISBN 0-14-009653-1.
- Thurgood Marshall: American Revolutionary. Three Rivers Press. 2000. ISBN 0-8129-3299-4.
- This Far by Faith: Stories from the African American Religious Experience. Harper Paperbacks. 2003. ISBN 0-06-093424-7.
- I'll Find a Way or Make One: A Tribute to Historically Black Colleges and Universities. HarperCollins. 2004. ISBN 0-06-009453-2.
- My Soul Looks Back in Wonder: Voices of the Civil Rights Experience. Sterling. 2005. ISBN 1-4027-2233-8.
- Black Farmers in America. The University Press of Kentucky. 2006. ISBN 0-8131-2399-2.
- Enough: The Phony Leaders, Dead-End Movements, and Culture of Failure That Are Undermining Black America – and What We Can Do About It. Three Rivers Press. 2007. ISBN 978-0-307-33824-2.
- Muzzled: The Assault on Honest Debate. Crown Publishing Group. 2011. ISBN 978-0-307-95201-1.
- We the People: The Modern-Day Figures Who Have Reshaped and Affirmed the Founding Fathers' Vision of America. Crown. 2016. ISBN 9780307952042.
- What the Hell Do You Have to Lose? Trump's War on Civil Rights. PublicAffairs. 2018. ISBN 9781541788268.
- New Prize for These Eyes: The Rise of America's Second Civil Rights Movement. Simon & Schuster. 2025. ISBN 9781668012352.
