= WriteToThem =

Political website in the United Kingdom

- Website type: Site for contacting elected representatives
- Owner: mySociety
- Creator: mySociety
- Website: www.writetothem.com
- Commercial: No
- Registration: None
- Launched: 2005; 21 years ago (FaxYourMP, a previous iteration, 2000)
- Current status: Active

WriteToThem is a website by mySociety which allows UK citizens to contact their elected representatives. Users do not need to know their representatives’ names: instead, using the mySociety software MapIt, the site matches their postcode to its various constituency boundaries, before displaying elected representatives at all levels of UK government from local councillors to MEPs. Users can send messages to them from the site; responses are then sent directly to the user's email address. Unlike many mySociety sites, there is no public element to the correspondence.

== History ==
The site launched in 2000 as FaxYourMP, allowing users to type a message into the website which would then be sent as a fax to their representative's office.

In 2005, it rebranded as WriteToThem, sending messages by email or as faxes to those representatives who did not yet operate an email account.

mySociety publish an annual table to show which MPs are the most and least responsive; this is based on the results of a rolling survey which is sent to users two weeks after they use the site.

In 2006, it was reported by The Guardian that the Conservative MP Ian Liddell-Grainger appeared to admit in an email to the site to attempting to "up" his rating by sending himself queries.
