= Tom Steinberg =

British civic activist and policy advisor

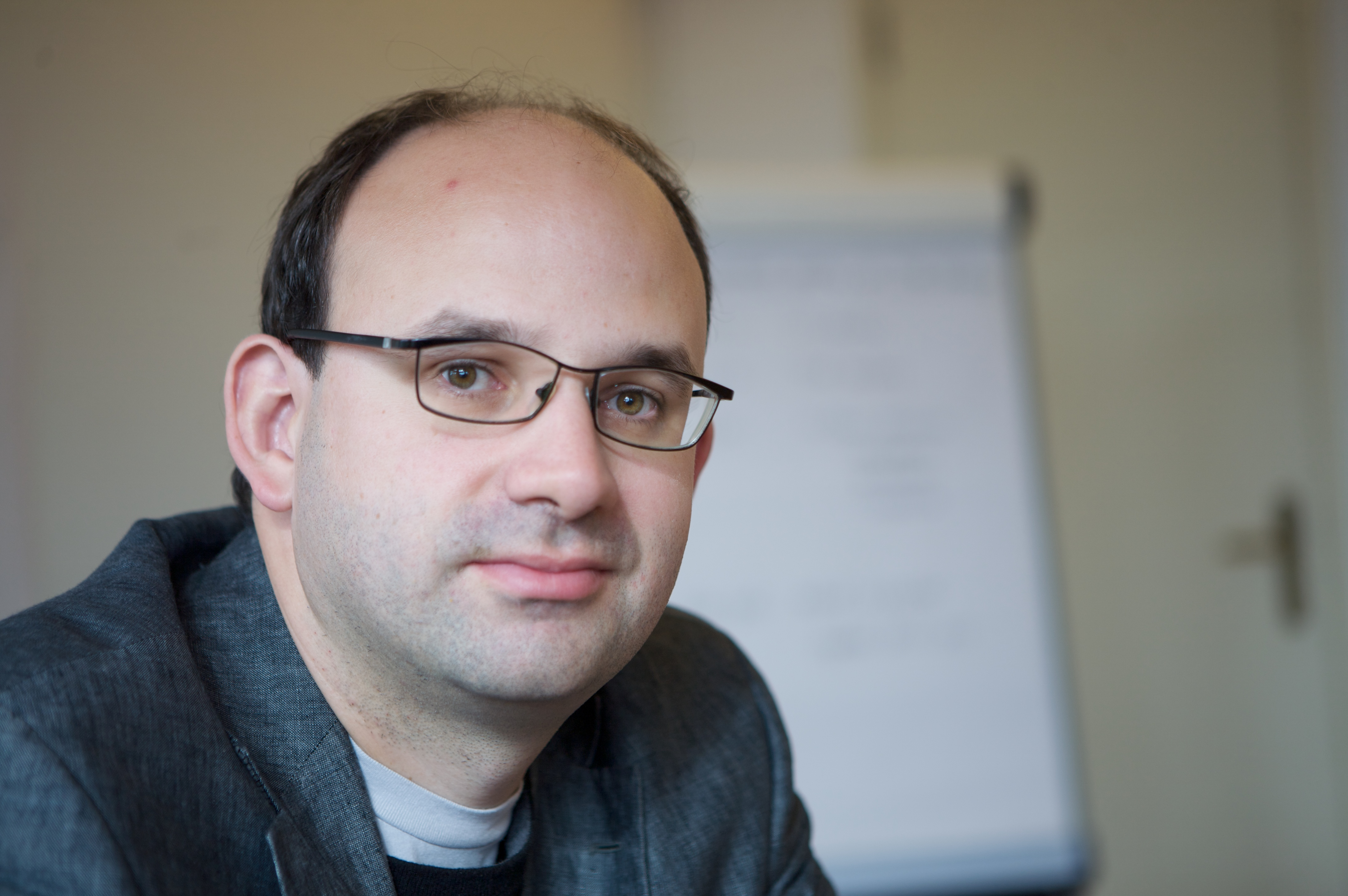
Tom Steinberg, 2009

Tom Steinberg is a nonprofit leader and author, with a career history mainly in public interest technology, and in the profession of grantmaking. He is the founder and a former director of mySociety, a British-based international NGO that develops civic tech tools including TheyWorkForYou, Alaveteli and FixMyStreet. Steinberg worked in Tony Blair's Prime Minister's Strategy Unit from 2001 to 2003.

== Biography ==
Steinberg co-authored Open source methods and their future potential which argued that the principles of the open source model could have radical implications for governments, citizens and businesses.

The Power of Information: An Independent Review by Ed Mayo and Tom Steinberg was published in 2007, as was the official government response to it.

In May 2010, it was announced that Steinberg would be part of the UK Government's new Transparency Board, which was to be established to promote "greater transparency across Government". He resigned in the second quarter of 2012.

Steinberg describes himself as 'a left-of-centre moderate'. In November 2012, at the request of Tom Watson MP, he published the policy papers he had written for both Labour and Conservative MPs, Ministers and party staff. In doing so, he wrote:

I regret that I seem to have allowed the impression to arise that I must myself be a conservative, who was trying to get the Tories elected. I'm not, and was not. I've never voted for a conservative party either in the UK or the US. I am a left-of-centre moderate who doesn't talk much about his personal politics because I don't enjoy the abuse you get when you do. Plus, the great majority of the technological advice I give is equally valid for governments of the left and right.

In March 2015, Steinberg announced his decision to stand down as the head of mySociety while, in his words, "we’ve got a good map, a solid car, and we’ve got enough money for fuel". In 2019, he co-authored with World Bank political scientist Tiago C. Peixoto the report Citizen Engagement : Emerging Digital Technologies Create New Risks and Value. In 2020 Steinberg co-founded Teaching Public Services in the Digital Age, an initiative supported by the Harvard Kennedy School that aims to increase the number of public servants who have the skills needed to succeed in the digital era.
