= The Landscape Agency =

British landscape architecture company

- Industry: Landscape Architecture
- Founded: October 1998
- Founder: Patrick James
- Headquarters: York
- Area served: Worldwide
- Website: The Landscape Agency

The Landscape Agency is a British landscape architecture company that was founded in 1998 by Patrick James. The company specializes in landscape design, landscape planning and landscape management with a focus on the conservation of historic landscapes.

The company is based in York and is run by Managing Director Edward Payne.

== History ==
After studying agriculture at the University of London and spending three years with Country Life, Patrick James spent four years working at the Heritage Lottery Fund. It was there that James gained architectural experience and decided to start his own company. Teaming up with two associates, Tom Stuart-Smith and Todd Longstaffe-Gowan, James founded The Landscape Agency in October 1998.

After two years, James decided to seek additional start-up capital to grow the business. The funding was successful and the company began to grow rapidly. As the company grew, the range of the projects also widened, although efforts remained focused on historic landscape projects across England and Ireland.

Early commissions for the Landscape Agency included preparing landscape management plans for Yorkshire Sculpture Park, Bramham Park, the London Zoo and Broadlands - a ‘Capability’ Brown park in Hampshire.

In 2003, The Landscape Agency was awarded the London Squares garden award for its work on the north central garden in Eaton Square. The company had spent the previous four years redesigning and replanting the once dilapidated gardens.

In 2007, the firm was commissioned by the Royal Horticultural Society to masterplan the Society's gardens at Wisley, Hyde Hall, Rosemoor and Harlow Carr. Then Creative Director Alistair Baldwin led the project, bringing about major change at all four sites.

More recent projects include the rejuvenation of the 120-acre (0.49 km^{2}) gardens at Lowther Castle in Cumbria, the rejuvenation of Belgrave, and Hackfall - a Grade I landscape near Ripon which had been neglected for almost a century. The Hackfall project was awarded a £1 million grant by the Heritage Lottery Fund and, in 2008, the project won the RIBA/Landscape Institute White Rose Award.
