= Tiago C. Peixoto =

Brazilian political scientist

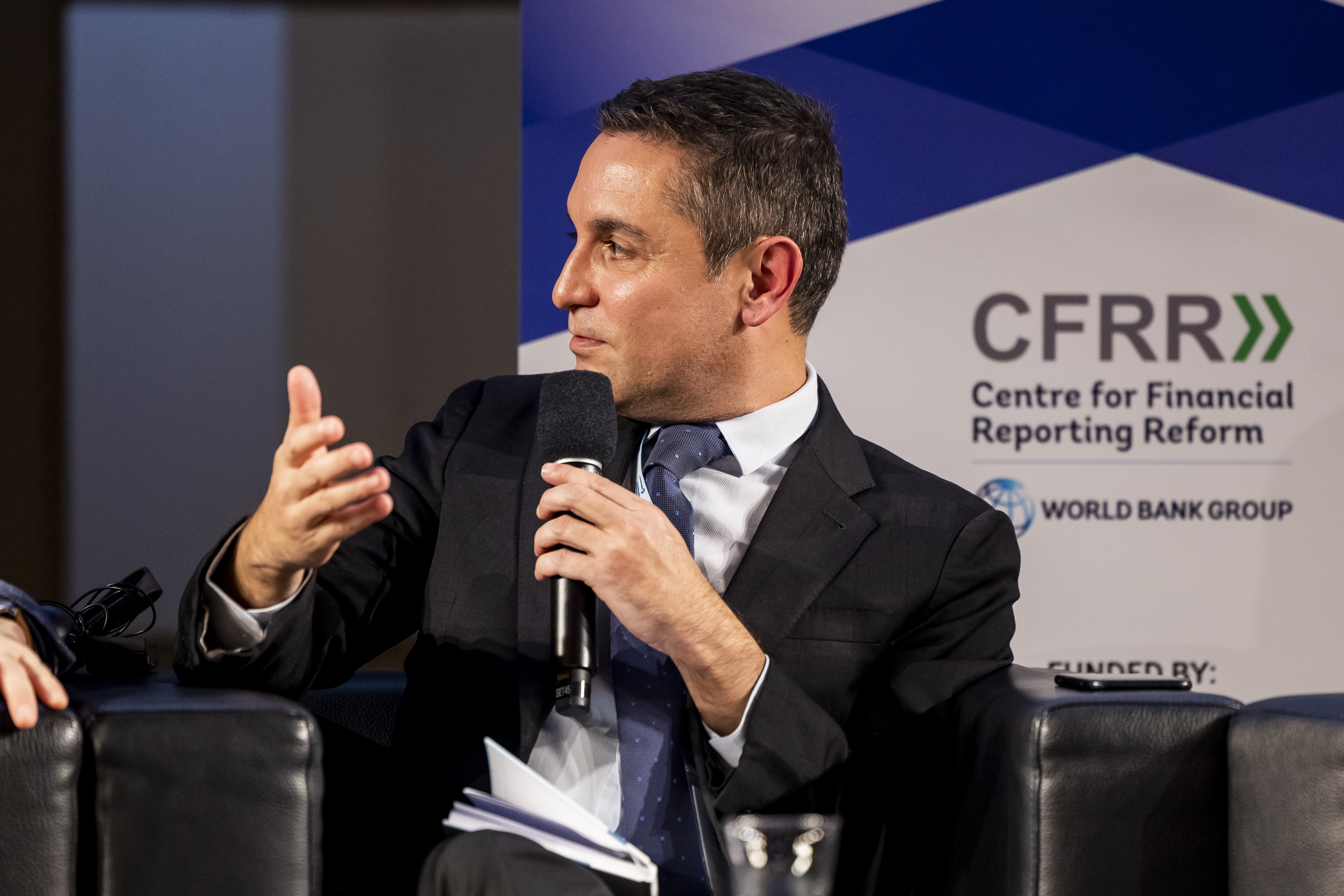
- Born: Tiago Carneiro Peixoto; 20 February 1977 (age 49); Araguari, Minas Gerais
- Education: Pontifícia Universidade Católica de Minas Gerais; European University Institute; Sciences-Po Paris
- Occupation: political scientist
- Years active: 2001-present
- Website: https://democracyspot.net/

Tiago Carneiro Peixoto (Araguari, born February 20, 1977) is a Brazilian political scientist and Senior Governance Specialist at the World Bank, who promotes participatory democracy and digital government around the globe. Recognized as an expert in e-democracy and participatory democracy, he was nominated as one of the most innovative people in democracy, as well as one of the 100 most influential people in digital government.

In 2010, he initiated an international mapping exercise of participatory budgeting practices, having contributed directly and indirectly to the process of implementation and expansion of participatory policies in different regions of the world.

He is a frequent speaker at high-level events such as the South Eastern Europe Ministerial Conference, Open Knowledge Festival and TICTec, as well as events promoted by public institutions such as the Ministry of Finance of Finland, the Parliament of the United Kingdom and the White House.

He holds a PhD and a Master’s degree in political science from the European University Institute, and a master's degree in Organized Collective Action from Sciences-Po Paris. He co-authored the books e-Agora: The White Book of Local e-Democracy: Reflections and Perspectives, and Civic Tech in the Global South: Assessing Technology for the Public Good.

== Career ==
For the past two decades Peixoto has worked in developed and developing countries on the promotion of citizen engagement, open government, and public sector innovation.

He has managed projects and consulted for several organizations such as the European Commission, OECD, and the United Nations. He was a director of the e-Democracy Center of the University of Zurich, a faculty member of the GovLab in New York University, and associated researcher of the e-Democracy Center at the University of Geneva.

With the World Bank since 2010, his work has focused on collaborating directly with governments to develop solutions for better public policies and services. He became a researcher for the World Bank’s ICT4Gov program and later became a multi-sectoral leader, leading the Digital Engagement Evaluation Team (DEET), which leverages modern methodologies to examine the effects of technology on public participation, government transparency and responsiveness. He also leads lending operations for the World Bank and the International Development Association, supporting investments in government projects across continents, developing digital solutions for better public services, as well as access to identity documents.

== Research and publications ==
A prominent researcher and commentator on open government and civic technology, he has conducted pioneering research on the impact of technology on democratic processes. This includes identifying factors that contribute to successful e-democracy and digital government practices, the role of open data in the public sector, the effects of participatory practices on tax revenues, and the impact of technology on political participation and gender representation.

His research has been featured in publications and events by academic institutions such as Harvard University, Stanford University, the Massachusetts Institute of Technology and Cornell University, and has featured in mainstream media including The Economist, Forbes, The Guardian, Le Monde, The Washington Post, New Scientist, Quartz, Pacific Standard and Mashable.

He has published academic articles in the British Journal of Political Science, UCLA Law Review, Electoral Studies, Journal of Information Technology and Politics, European Journal of eParticipation, and Public Administration Review. Through the blog DemocracySpot he analyzes and disseminates international research on issues related to public participation, civic technology and innovation in the public sector.

== Awards and honors ==
In 2012, while a consultant at the World Bank, he was nominated by TechCrunch as one of the 20 Most Innovative People in Democracy, along with former presidents Barack Obama and Toomas Hendrik Ilves, as well as former Google CEO, Eric Schmidt.

For two consecutive years, in 2018 and 2019, he was nominated as one of the World’s 100 Most Influential People in Digital Government by Apolitical, based on nominations from over 130 experts in digital government from national governments, academia, business, and international organizations including the OECD, USAID, the Open Government Partnership and the Alan Turing Institute.

In 2018, he and his co-authors received the Louis Brownlow Award from the American Society for Public Administration for the article The Effect of Bureaucratic Responsiveness on Citizen Participation. The article used data from UK website FixMyStreet to develop a calculation that allows examination of the impact of government responsiveness on future public participation, providing for the first time in the literature an empirical proof of the hypothesis that, when a government is reactive to citizens’ engagement, these citizens become more likely to participate in the future.

He was nominated as co-chair of the editorial board of the Open Governance Research Exchange (OGRX), a collaborative platform for the sharing of research on public sector innovation. In 2020 he became a member of the advisory board of the World Citizens’ Assembly, along with other prominent political scientists such as Jane Mansbridge and Terry Bouricius.

== Bibliography ==
- e-AGORA: The White Book of Local e-Democracy: Reflections and Perspectives (2006)
- Civic Tech in the Global South: Assessing Technology for the Public Good (2017)
