= QuickCode =

- Available in: English
- Revenue: Sponsored by 4iP
- Website: quickcode.io
- Current status: Inactive
- Content license: GNU Affero General Public License

QuickCode (formerly ScraperWiki) was a web-based platform for collaboratively building programs to extract and analyze public (online) data, in a wiki-like fashion. "Scraper" refers to screen scrapers, programs that extract data from websites. "Wiki" means that any user with programming experience can create or edit such programs for extracting new data, or for analyzing existing datasets. The main use of the website is providing a place for programmers and journalists to collaborate on analyzing public data.

The service was renamed circa 2016, as "it isn't a wiki or just for scraping any more". At the same time, the eponymous parent company was renamed to 'The Sensible Code Company'.

== History ==
ScraperWiki was founded in 2009 by Julian Todd and Aidan McGuire. It was initially funded by 4iP, the venture capital arm of TV station Channel 4. Since then, it has attracted an additional £1 Million round of funding from Enterprise Ventures.

Aidan McGuire is the chief executive officer of The Sensible Code Company

== See also ==
- Data driven journalism
- Web scraping
