= Iomart =

Scottish IT and cloud computing company

Iomart Group plc
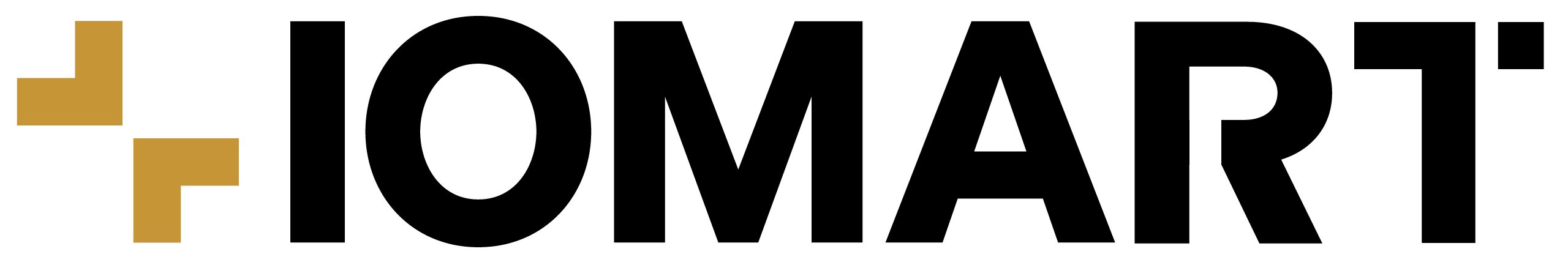
- Traded as: LSE: IOM
- Industry: cloud computing information technology
- Founded: 1998
- Founder: Angus MacSween
- Headquarters: 6 Atlantic Quay, 55 Robertson Street, Glasgow, Scotland, G2 8JD, Scotland
- Products: Managed cloud services
- Number of employees: 650 (2024)
- Website: www.iomart.com

Iomart Group plc is a United Kingdom-based company that specializes in cloud computing and managed IT services, with its headquarters located in Glasgow, Scotland.

== History ==
Iomart was founded in 1998 as an integrated internet and telecommunications company by former Scottish Telecom senior executives Angus MacSween and Bill Dobbie. In 1999, the company received its first revenue from the launch of its business service in conjunction with Richard Branson's Virginbiz.net.

In 2000, Iomart Group incorporated and floated on the London Stock Exchange's Alternative Investment Market AIM. Through its Madasafish brand Iomart offered the first UK consumer broadband connection. It also launched Scottish consumer Internet Service Provider, Jings! In the same year, Iomart launched the UK's first outsourced large-scale email hosting platform, ThinkMail.

In 2002, the Telco businesses were sold for £2 million to Centrica and in 2003 the group acquired Web Genie Internet Ltd for £437 thousand.

In 2005, it launched the UK business directory Ufindus and Netintelligence Managed Services Platform.

2006 saw the launch of Netintelligence as the world's first security Software as a Service product.

In 2007, the group bought its first four data centres across the UK.

In Autumn 2012 Iomart Group made a multimillion-pound investment in creating its own resilient dedicated fibre network to connect its data centres. The group also went on to acquire Melbourne Server Hosting for £7m and Hosting UK (Internet Engineering Ltd) for £1.25m adding three datacenters to its portfolio in the process; two from Melbourne Server Hosting in Manchester and one from Hosting UK in North Wales. It also launched the Host Your Kit youth football campaign.

In 2014, the company expanded further with new data centre and infrastructure operations on the east and west coasts of the US.

As of September 2015, Iomart owned and managed data centres in eight locations.

Reece Donovan, who joined the board in March 2020 as chief operating officer before assuming the role of CEO in September 2020, has been succeeded by Lucy Dimes, the company’s executive chair.

In 2023, Iomart relocated its headquarters to central Glasgow. That same year, the company acquired London-based legal sector specialist Accesspoint Technologies, followed by the acquisition of Atech Support in 2024.

== Mergers and Acquisitions ==
In 2004, Iomart bought web hosting brand Easyspace for £10.5m as well as hosting and domain company Internetters for £250k.

In 2008, Iomart sold Ufindus to BT for £20m. The following year, Iomart acquired dedicated server hosting specialist RapidSwitch for £5.3m.

In 2011, the company also acquired Titan Internet for £4.2m, Switch Media for £1.25m, Global Gold for £1.2m, and EQSN for £2.5m.

In 2012, the company acquired Melbourne Server Hosting for £7m and Internet Engineering Ltd t/a Hosting UK for £1.25m.

In 2013, the company made two more acquisitions, Redstation for £8m and Backup Technology for £23m.

At the end of 2014 the company made an announcement that they had acquired rival cloud service provider ServerSpace to further expand the group.
