= MySociety =

Registered charity working in the civic technology space

mySociety
- mySociety logo
- Founded: 2003
- Founder: Tom Steinberg
- Purpose: Government transparency; Civic technologies; Freedom of Information; Citizen empowerment; Open source
- Location: United Kingdom
- Products: TheyWorkForYou; WriteToThem; WhatDoTheyKnow; FixMyStreet; Alaveteli; EveryPolitician
- Employees: 35 (2024)
- Website: mysociety.org

mySociety is a UK-based registered charity, previously named UK Citizens Online Democracy. It began as a UK-focused organisation with the aim of making online democracy tools for UK citizens. However, those tools were open source, so that the code could be (and soon was) redeployed in other countries.

== History ==
mySociety was founded by Tom Steinberg in September 2003, and started activity after receiving a £250,000 grant in September 2004. Steinberg says that it was inspired by a collaboration with his then-flatmate James Crabtree which spawned Crabtree's article "Civic hacking: a new agenda for e-democracy".

mySociety went on to simplify and internationalise its code and through the now dormant Poplus project, encouraged others to share open source code that would minimise the amount of duplication in civic tech coding.

Like many non-profits, mySociety sustains itself with a mixture of grant funding and commercial work, providing software and development services to local government and other organisations.

In March 2015, Steinberg announced his decision to stand down as executive director of mySociety. In July of that year, Mark Cridge became the organisation's new CEO.

== Projects ==
- TheyWorkForYou is a parliamentary monitoring website which aims to make it easier for UK citizens to understand what is going on in Westminster as well as Scottish Parliament, the Welsh Assembly and the Northern Ireland Assembly. It also helps create accountability for UK politicians by publishing a complete archive of every word spoken in Parliament, along with a voting record and other details for each MP, past and present.
- FixMyStreet platform is free and open source software which enables anyone to run a map based website and app that helps people inform their local authority of problems needing their attention, such as potholes, broken streetlamps, etc. The UK version is FixMyStreet.com. mySociety also provide FixMyStreet as a report making system for several local and transport authorities in the UK, including TfL.
- WhatDoTheyKnow is a site designed to help people in the United Kingdom make Freedom of Information requests. It publishes both the requests and the authorities’ responses online, with the aim of making information available to all, and of removing the need for multiple people to make the same requests. By 2011, a significant proportion of requests, around 15%, to UK central government were being made through the site; more recently, that's still the case, with a little over 15% of requests to audited bodies and around 20% of those to ministerial departments being sent through the service.
- Alaveteli is free and open source software to help citizens write Freedom of Information requests and automatically publish any responses. The UK version is WhatDoTheyKnow.
- WriteToThem is a website which allows UK citizens to contact their elected representatives. Users do not need to know their representatives’ names: instead, using the mySociety software MapIt, the site matches their postcode to its various constituency boundaries, before displaying elected representatives at all levels of UK government from local councillors to MEPs. Users can send messages to them from the site; responses are then sent directly to the user's email address.
- SayIt: software for publishing transcripts of debates (e.g. from parliaments, court proceedings and meetings).
- MapIt: software for matching a geographical point with its legislative boundaries. MapIt underlies several mySociety websites such as FixMyStreet and WriteToThem, where it allows for a user to input a postcode and be matched to the correct local authority or representative.
- Gaze: a gazetteer web service

=== Discontinued or passed to new owners ===
- Poplus was an international federation of organisations who benefitted through the sharing of civic code and online technologies. It was set up in April 2014 by mySociety in collaboration with Chilean e-democracy organisation Fundación Ciudadano Inteligente and encouraged the development of free, open source civic 'blocks' of software, which it termed 'Components', intended to make it easier for people to build civic tech tools. In 2014 Nominet awarded Poplus a place in the Nominet Trust 100. Poplus ceased being maintained in 2016.
- Mapumental was free and open source software for displaying journeys in terms of how long they take, rather than by distance, a technique also known as isochrone or geospatial mapping. It was withdrawn in 2020.
- Pombola was free open source software for running a parliamentary monitoring website inspired by TheyWorkForYou. While it is still available, it is no longer being actively maintained.
- Downing Street e-Petitions: mySociety developed the original solution for publishing petitions on the website of the Prime Minister's Office. In 2011 the system was replaced with the government's own development.
- EveryPolitician: a project that ran from 2015 to 2019, with the aim of storing and sharing data on every politician in the world, in structured open data
- Pledgebank: Allowed users to make pledges of the format: "I will do x if y number of people agree to do the same". Now dormant, with archives still browsable.
- HassleMe: a website that sends reminders sporadically, now run independently of mySociety
- HearFromYourMP: a site encouraging MPs to email their constituents, closed May 2015
- FixMyTransport: a site in the model of FixMyStreet for contacting any transport operator in Britain about problems with public transport. Correspondence was published online. The site ran from 2011 to 2015 and has now been frozen, though archives are still browsable.
- PopIt: Storage of open data on politicians
- ScenicOrNot: a gamification-powered site which invites users to rate photographs according to their ‘scenicness’. The results fed into Mapumental. In 2015 ScenicOrNot was passed over to the Warwick Business School where it is being used to track the correlation between health and the beauty of one's surroundings.
- GroupsNearYou: a map-based application that enabled users to find local community groups in their local area.
- NotApathetic: a site where people who planned not to vote in the 2005 United Kingdom general election could explain why.
- Placeopedia: an online gazetteer consisting of a mashup of Google Maps and the English Wikipedia.
- Democracy Club: an election information project, now a separate company.

== See also ==
- Civic hacking
- Chris Lightfoot
- Digital citizen
- Elections in the United Kingdom
- Francis Irving
- Open government
- Politics of the United Kingdom
- Public Whip
