= Adrian Holovaty =

American web developer, musician, entrepreneur

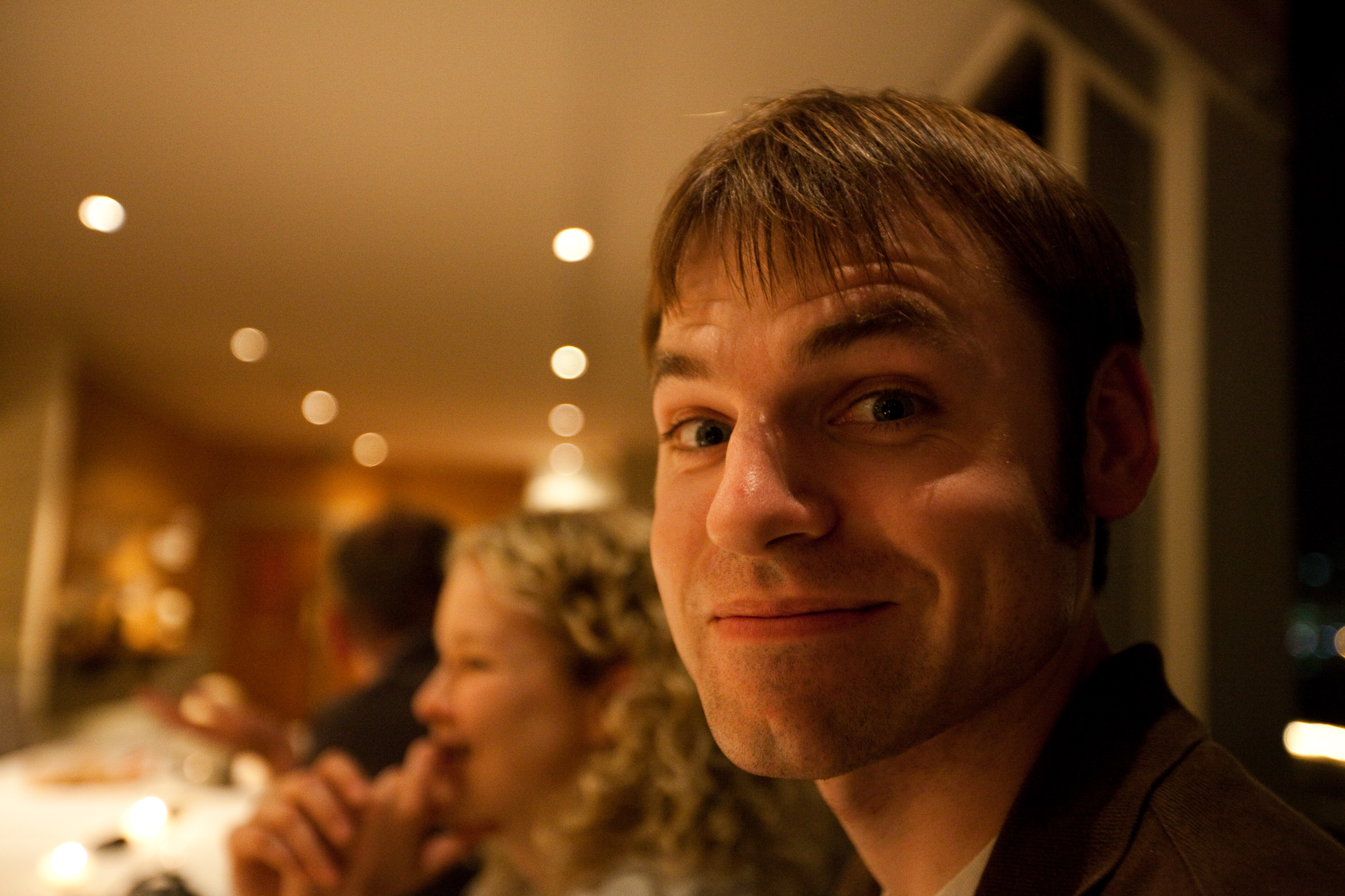
- Holovaty in 2009
- Born: 1981 (age 44–45); Naperville, Illinois, U.S.
- Education: Missouri School of Journalism (B.A., 2001)
- Occupations: Web developer; musician; entrepreneur
- Known for: Django Web framework

Adrian Holovaty (born 1981) is an American web developer, musician and entrepreneur from Chicago, Illinois, living in Amsterdam, the Netherlands. He is co-creator of the Django web framework and an advocate of "journalism via computer programming".

== Life and career ==
Holovaty, a Ukrainian American, grew up in Naperville, Illinois and attended Naperville North High School. While he served as co-editor of the high school's newspaper, The North Star, a censored article about a faculty member sexually assaulting a student reignited an anti-censorship debate in the Illinois house of representatives. He graduated from the Missouri School of Journalism in 2001 and worked as a web developer/journalist for The Atlanta Journal-Constitution, Lawrence Journal-World and The Washington Post before starting EveryBlock, a web startup that provided "microlocal" news, in 2007.

While working at the Lawrence Journal-World from 2002 to 2005, he and other web developers (Simon Willison, Jacob Kaplan-Moss and Wilson Miner) created Django, an open source web application framework for Python. He and Kaplan-Moss served as the framework's Benevolent Dictators for Life until January 2014. The pair wrote The Django Book, first published in 2007.

In 2012, he and PJ Macklin founded Soundslice, a website for learning, practicing and teaching music, via "interactive sheet music" that is synced with real audio and video recordings.

In 2018, he was named co-chair of the W3C Music Notation Community Group, given responsibility over developing MNX, a new, open format for encoding music notation.

=== Guitar ===
Holovaty is a Fingerstyle and Gypsy jazz guitarist. Since 2007 he has posted videos of his acoustic guitar arrangements on YouTube, building an audience of more than 30,000 subscribers.

In 2023, he released an album of 10 original guitar instrumentals, "Melodic Guitar Music."

He has served on the guitar faculty of Django In June, an instructional camp for Gypsy jazz music, for several years.

=== Crime mapping innovations ===
In 2005, Holovaty launched chicagocrime.org, a Google Maps mashup of Chicago Police Department crime data. The site won the 2005 Batten Award for Innovations in Journalism and was named by The New York Times as one of 2005's best ideas.

As one of the first Google Maps mashups, it helped influence Google to create its official Google Maps API. Newspaper sites such as the Chicago Tribune and the Chicago Sun-Times have incorporated a map from EveryBlock, the successor to chicagocrime.org, into their web sites.

In 2007, Holovaty was awarded a $1.1 million Knight Foundation grant and left his job as editor of editorial innovations at washingtonpost.com to start EveryBlock, the successor to chicagocrime.org. On August 17, 2009, EveryBlock was officially acquired by MSNBC. The terms of the deal were not disclosed. In February 2013, NBC News announced that it was shutting down EveryBlock. The service was re-launched by Comcast NBCUniversal in January, 2014 and operated in Boston, Chicago, Denver, Fresno, Hialeah, Houston, Medford, Nashville, Philadelphia, and Seattle. On July 19, 2018, EveryBlock was acquired by social networking service Nextdoor and shut down.
