= WhatDoTheyKnow =

British website dealing in freedom-of-information requests

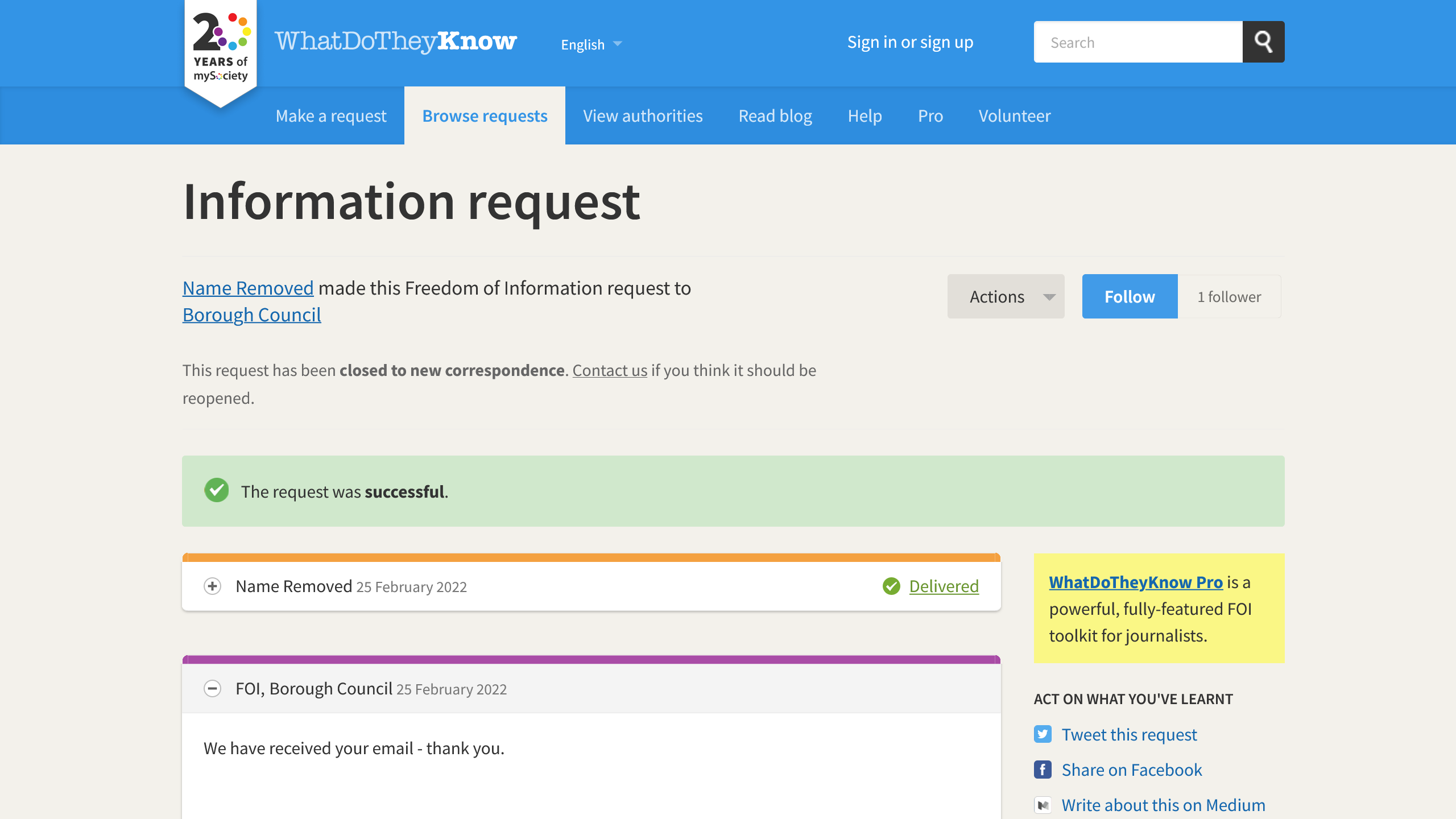
- Example request using the WhatDoTheyKnow interface
- Website type: Freedom of Information website
- Owner: mySociety
- Creator: User-generated/Public Authority generated
- Website: WhatDoTheyKnow.com
- Commercial: No
- Registration: Optional
- Launched: 25 February 2008; 18 years ago
- Current status: Active
- Written in: Ruby

WhatDoTheyKnow is a site by mySociety designed to help people in the United Kingdom make Freedom of Information requests. It publishes both the requests and the authorities’ responses online, with the aim of making information available to all, and of removing the need for multiple people to make the same requests. The site acts as a permanent public database archive of FOI requests made through it.

Around 15% to 20% of requests to UK Central Government are made through WhatDoTheyKnow.com. Over 45,000 public bodies have been added to the site, mainly by volunteers. More than 800,000 requests have been made using the site and more than 4.5 million people visited it in 2014

WhatDoTheyKnow has been described by The Guardian as "an idiot's guide to making a freedom of information request." The Information Commissioner's Office has stated that it believes "the most up-to-date informal list of all public authorities is held on the website". Information released through the site has given rise to serious and less serious news stories. The site is used by a number of MPs.

The site was originally available only in English but a partially translated Welsh version was added in 2013.

== Finances ==
In 2011, the site cost around £12,000 a year to run. The server costs are partly sponsored by Bytemark Hosting.

== History ==
WhatDoTheyKnow started life as the winning idea for a mySociety competition in 2006 for ideas for public interest websites to build. Both Phil Rodgers and Francis Irving entered the idea of a site to make it easy to make Freedom of Information requests. Francis Irving later became the main developer of the site, which was launched in 2008.

The site was nominated for a number of awards:

- Daily Telegraph best green websites - ranked number 2
- New Media Awards - Democracy in Action Finalists 2008
- New Media Awards - Innovation Winner 2008

WhatDoTheyKnow volunteer Alex Skene gave evidence to a Justice Committee related to Post-Legislative Scrutiny of the Freedom of Information Act 2000 on 21 February 2012.

As with other mySociety citizen-to-government software, mySociety sells WhatDoTheyKnow as a service for councils. In April 2012, Brighton and Hove councillor Jason Kitkat announced: “We [the council] are working with mySociety to adapt their WhatDoTheyKnow system to support a better workflow for freedom of information requests and proactive publishing of everything we release."

WhatDoTheyKnow was developed as open-source software. It now runs on the Alaveteli platform, which is itself an adaptation of the original code written to power WhatDoTheyKnow. Alaveteli was developed to make the process of setting up a site like WhatDoTheyKnow in other countries easier.
