= EveryBlock =

Network of news websites

EveryBlock was a network of hyperlocal news websites that was originally founded in 2007 with a $1.1 million grant from the Knight Foundation as part of the Knight News Challenge. The founders included Adrian Holovaty, a well-known programmer.

== History ==
The site launched in January 2008 in Chicago and was acquired by MSNBC in 2009. NBC then acquired MSNBC in 2012 and shut down EveryBlock in 2013. Comcast then relaunched EveryBlock in 2014. In 2018, EveryBlock was acquired by social networking service Nextdoor and shut down, though Nextdoor kept the trademark.

EveryBlock maps plotted a mix of commercial, government and nonprofit feeds that were geotagged by location. Users could experience a blend of Flickr photos, recent crime reports, 3-1-1 calls, permit filings, local news stories and home foreclosures that could be viewed as a map, list or RSS feed.

The site eventually grew to provide local news for 19 cities, including San Francisco, Atlanta, New York City and Los Angeles.

== Legacy ==
While EveryBlock did not last as a standalone business, it was considered influential for its impact on the open data movement in local governments, and custom maps on top of Google Maps.

As a condition of the Knight grant, the EveryBlock source code was made open-source. Holovaty has written that Kevin Systrom, the CEO of Instagram, had emailed him to say that he learned a lot about the Django web framework, also co-created by Holovaty, from reading the EveryBlock source code.

== See also ==
- Eurasianet
