= FixMyStreet =

Software for reporting street problems

FixMyStreet Platform
- Release: 2012
- Stable release: 6.0 / November 15, 2024; 22 months ago
- License: AGPLv3
- Website: fixmystreet.org
- Repository: github.com/mysociety/fixmystreet

FixMyStreet is a free and open-source software framework by mySociety which enables anyone to run a website for aggregating and reporting street problems, similar to FixMyStreet.com.

The United Kingdom FixMyStreet inspired similar sites in other countries: in order to prevent the need for people to write code from scratch, mySociety refined the FixMyStreet open source codebase, making it more generic, easier to install, and able to handle different maps, including OpenStreetMap. This process was kickstarted when the NUUG funded the development of a Norwegian version FiksGataMi.
