= Airlift =

Military transportation of materials and personnel using aircraft

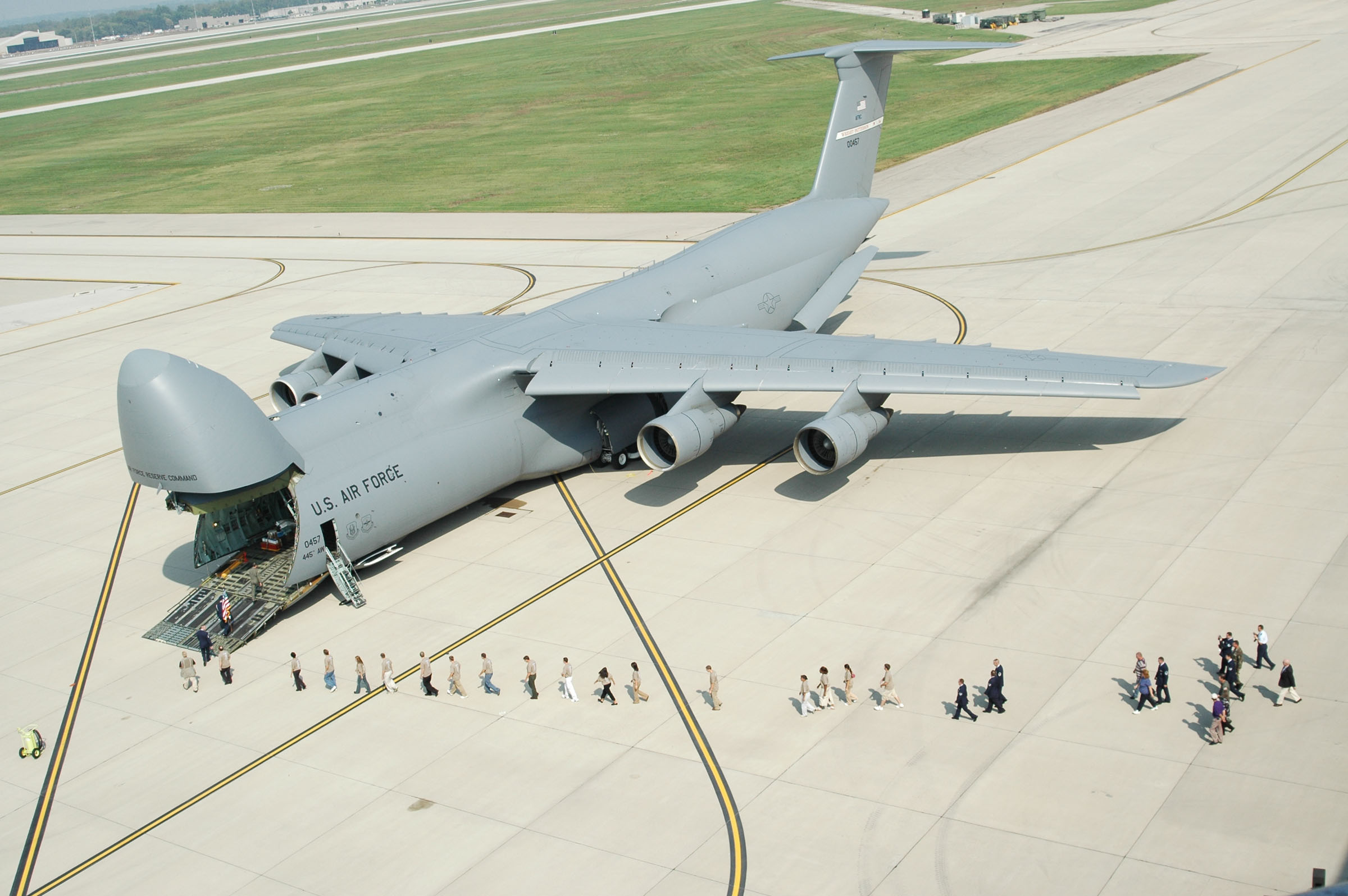
People boarding a Lockheed C-5 Galaxy, a large military cargo aircraft

An airlift is the organized delivery of supplies or personnel primarily via military transport aircraft.

Airlifting consists of two distinct types: strategic and tactical. Typically, strategic airlifting involves moving material long distances (such as across or off the continent or theater), whereas a tactical airlift focuses on deploying resources and material into a specific location with high precision.

Depending on the situation, airlifted supplies can be delivered by a variety of means. When the destination and surrounding airspace is considered secure, the aircraft will land at an appropriate airport or airbase to have its cargo unloaded on the ground. When landing the craft or distributing the supplies to a certain area from a landing zone by surface transportation is not an option, the cargo aircraft can drop them in mid-flight using parachutes attached to the supply containers in question. When there is a broad area available where the intended receivers have control without fear of the enemy interfering with the collection and/or stealing the goods, the planes can maintain a normal flight altitude and simply airdrop the supplies down and let them parachute to the ground. However, when the area is too small for this method, as with an isolated base, and/or is too dangerous to land in, a Low-altitude parachute-extraction system drop is used.

During disasters and other crises, airlifts are used to support or replace other transport methods to relieve beleaguered civilian populations. Examples include the Berlin Airlift, to supply isolated West Berlin with food and coal, the 1990 Air India airlift to rescue Indian citizens caught up in the Gulf War, and the 1967–70 Biafran airlift during the Nigerian Civil War.

== History ==
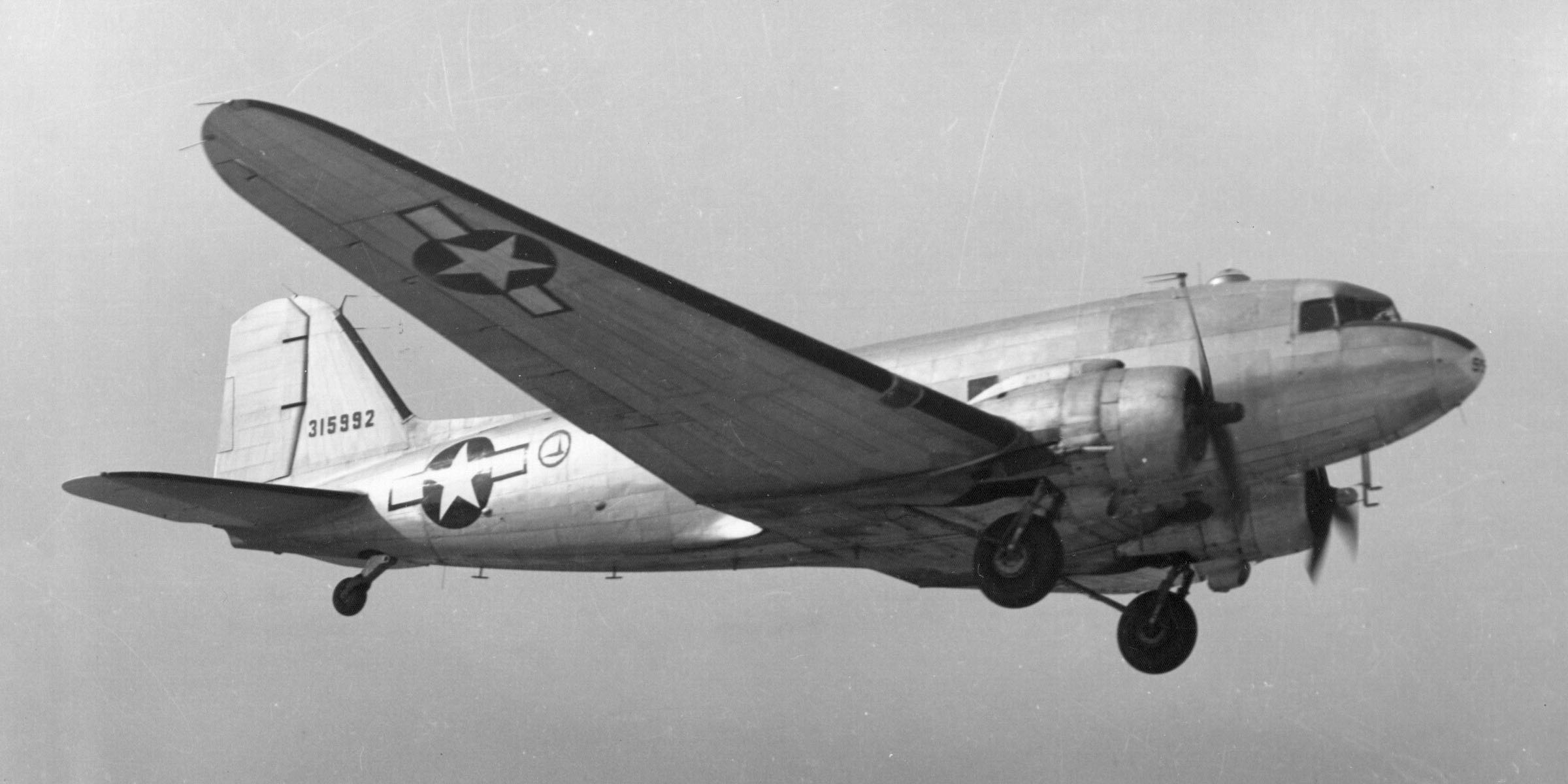
The Douglas C-47 Skytrain was used extensively during the Berlin airlift.

In November 1915 the French squadron MF 99 S, equipped with Farman MF.11, flew wounded soldiers from Serbia through Albania to Corfu. This was the first medevac operation in air history.

In April 1923 aircraft of the British Royal Air Force's Iraq Command flew 280 Sikh troops from Kingarban to Kirkuk in the first British air trooping operation. This operation was only conducted over a short-range and it was not until 1929 that the RAF conducted a long-range non-combat air evacuation of British Embassy staff from Afghanistan to India using a Vickers Victoria during the Kabul airlift.

The world's first long-range combat airlift took place from July to October 1936. Nazi German Luftwaffe Ju 52 and Fascist Italian Regia Aeronautica Savoia-Marchetti SM.81 were used by the Spanish Nationalist Air Force to transport Army of Africa troops from Spanish Morocco to the Spanish mainland at the beginning of the Spanish Civil War.

Airlifts became practical during World War II as aircraft became large and sophisticated enough to handle large cargo demands. The Germans used an airlift in successful relief of the Demyansk Pocket, albeit with the Luftwaffe suffering considerable losses to its fleet of transport planes. Due to the apparent vindication of the airlift tactic, Chief of the Oberkommando der Luftwaffe Hermann Göring assured Adolf Hitler that the Luftwaffe could conduct an airlift on a larger scale, which was the key factor not to let the Sixth Army withdraw from Stalingrad after its encirclement by the Red Army. However the Luftwaffe was strained at this point while facing better prepared Soviet air forces at Stalingrad, so they were unable to delivery the necessary supplies before the airfields were overrun. In spite of the airlift's obvious shortcomings, Hitler refused permission for the Sixth Army to attempt a breakout, eventually leading its commander Friedrich Paulus to surrender.

The U.S. Army Air Force's Air Transport Command began the largest and longest-sustained airlift of the war in May 1942, delivering more than half a million net tons of materiel from India to Free China over the Hump by November 1945. After many USAAF airmen were shot down in Nazi-occupied Serbia during Operation Tidal Wave, the U.S. Fifteenth Air Force and the Office of Strategic Services evacuated a number of them in Operation Halyard with the assistance of Draža Mihailović's Chetnik partisans. Additionally, at the end of World War II the USAAF and the RAF arranged humanitarian airdrops to the Nazi-occupied Netherlands through Operations Manna and Chowhound to alleviate the Dutch famine of 1944-45.

The largest airlift was the Berlin airlift, lasting from June 1948 to September 1949, an international operation intended to thwart the blockading of West Berlin by the Soviet Union. The airlift was arranged by the U.S. Air Force, the British Royal Air Force, the French Air Force, the Royal Canadian Air Force, the Royal Australian Air Force, the Royal New Zealand Air Force, and the South African Air Force using C-47 Skytrains, C-54 Skymasters, Handley Page Haltons, and Short Sunderlands. Many Soviet and Western leaders alike initially assumed that an airlift to resupply West Berlin would fail because of the results of the Battle of Stalingrad. However, it instead succeeded and became an embarrassment for the Soviet Union, which ended the blockade. The blockade and the success of the airlift would be a major factor in the beginning of the Cold War and the formation of the North Atlantic Treaty Organization, the Western European Union, and the Federal Republic of Germany.

The Israeli Air Force and El Al conducted a number of airlifts during the Jewish exodus from Arab and Muslim countries to Israel after the 1948 Arab–Israeli War. In 1949 Israel evacuated 49,000 Yemenite Jews to Israel via Operation On Wings of Eagles. In 1951 it carried out Operation Ezra and Nehemiah evacuating over 120,000 Jews from Iraq to Israel via British Cyprus.

The Israel Defense Forces later evacuated over 8,000 Beta Israel refugees from Ethiopia living in refugee camps in Sudan through Operation Moses, Operation Joshua, and Operation Solomon during the Ethiopian famine and civil war.

During the First Indochina War, the French expeditionary forces devised the hérisson ('hedgehog') concept, establishing a fortified airhead by airlifting soldiers to positions adjacent to key Viet Minh supply lines to Laos. This would cut off Viet Minh soldiers fighting in Laos and force them to withdraw. "It was an attempt to interdict the enemy's rear area, to stop the flow of supplies and reinforcements, to establish a redoubt in the enemy's rear and disrupt his lines". It was executed successfully at the Battle of Nà Sản, so the French hoped to repeat it on a larger scale at the Battle of Điện Biên Phủ. However, based on the lessons learned from Nà Sản, the Viet Minh improved their preparations at Điện Biên Phủ including concealed artillery and massed anti-aircraft batteries, making it dangerous for the French aircraft to use the runways, afterwards a bombardment forced the French to abandon use of the airstrip altogether and rely upon parachute drops. The besieged French forces eventually surrendered.

The largest civilian airlift ever, the Biafran airlift, was carried out by Protestant and Catholic churches working together under the banner "Joint Church Aid" (JCA) to carry food to Biafra, during the Biafran secession war from Nigeria in 1967–70. This joint effort (which those involved used to call "Jesus Christ Airlines" as an inside joke from the initials JCA) is estimated to have saved more than a million lives in Biafra. Most airplanes departed from Portuguese São Tomé and Príncipe to the bush landing strip of Uli, the only operational "airport" in Biafra, which was made by enlarging a common road. Flights were made flying at night with all lights off and under near-total radio silence to avoid Nigerian Air Force MiG aircraft. All the airplanes, crews, and logistics were paid, set up, and maintained by the joint church groups. JCA and their crews and aircraft (mostly aging multi prop airliners like DC-7's, Lockheed Constellation and Superconstellations, DC-6's, and DC3's) kept flying into Biafra at the cost of many crews lives.

During the 1973 Yom Kippur War, the U.S. Air Force Military Airlift Command conducted Operation Nickel Grass to resupply Israel in the face of a coordinated surprise attack by Egypt and Syria. The airlift allowed Israel to begin a counteroffensive against the Arab states but caused the Organization of Petroleum Exporting Countries to place an oil embargo on the United States, beginning the 1970s energy crisis.

During the 1974 Turkish invasion of Cyprus the Hellenic Air Force attempted to airlift commandos to Nicosia Airport through Operation Niki but failed after the Nord Noratlas planes were shot down by friendly fire from the Cypriot National Guard after flying over RAF Akrotiri.

The largest civilian airlift in history was conducted by Air India during the Gulf War, which repatriated 176,000 Indian migrant workers stranded in Ba'athist Iraq after the invasion of Kuwait. India has conducted other airlifts of migrant workers during Middle Eastern crises. The Indian Navy evacuated numerous Indian civilians from the 2006 Lebanon War via Operation Sukoon, from the First Libyan Civil War via Operation Safe Homecoming, from the South Sudanese Civil War via Operation Sankat Mochan, and from the Saudi-Yemen War in Operation Raahat. The Pakistan Navy also evacuated Pakistani nationals from Yemen via an airlift during the Saudi intervention. The Indian Armed Forces also conducted an airlift to Nepal after the 2015 Nepal earthquake through Operation Maitri.

During the outbreak of the COVID-19 pandemic in Wuhan, numerous air forces and civilian airlines arranged evacuation flights from Wuhan Tianhe International Airport.

The highest rate of civilian airlift in history (number of civilians evacuated per day) was during fall of Kabul in August 2021, where 778 flights evacuated 124,334 people over 17 days - 7,300 civilians per day (compared to 2,700 per day airlift of Indians from Kuwait in 1990). The evacuation peaked on August 23, 2021, where over 21,600 civilians were evacuated in a single day. During the fall of Kabul at the end of the War in Afghanistan after the Taliban captured most of Afghanistan in a 2021 offensive following the withdrawal of US and NATO forces, foreign governments evacuated hundreds of thousands of their citizens as well as at-risk Afghans from Hamid Karzai International Airport. As part of the U.S. Armed Forces' Operation Allies Refuge, U.S. Secretary of Defense Lloyd Austin requisitioned U.S. airliners through the Civil Reserve Air Fleet to assist the U.S. Transportation Command. The U.S. Department of Defense later claimed to have evacuated 122,000 people, including U.S. citizens and Afghan Special Immigrant Visa applicants. Other airlifts included the British Armed Forces' Operation Pitting, the Canadian Armed Forces' Operation AEGIS, and the Indian Armed Forces' Operation Devi Shakti.

== Strategic airlift ==
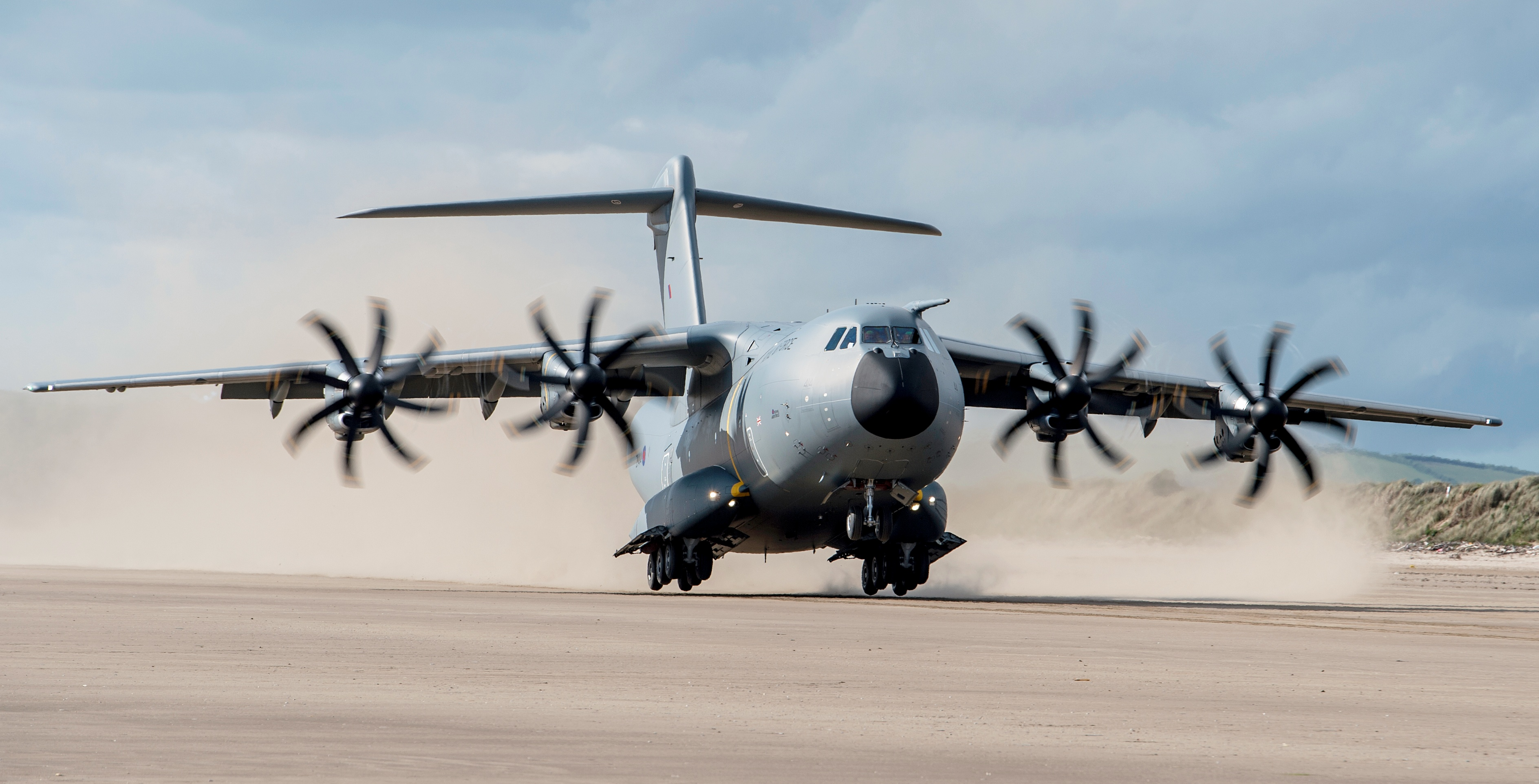
The Airbus A400M Atlas performs tactical as well as strategic airlift.

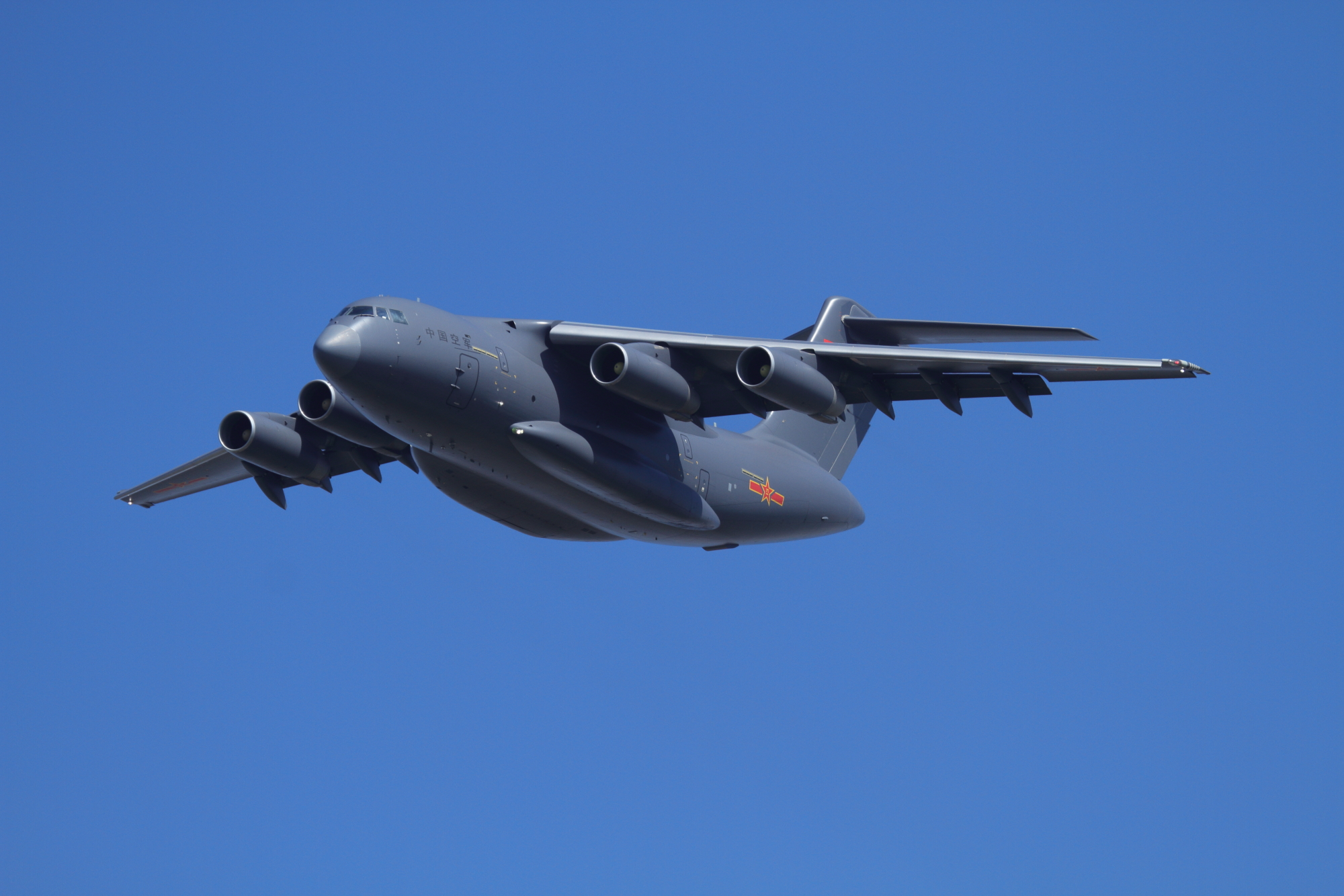
Xi'an Y-20 at Airshow China 2016

Strategic airlift is the use of military transport aircraft to transport vehicles, materiel, weaponry, or personnel over long distances. Typically, this involves airlifting the required items between two airbases that are not in the same vicinity. This allows commanders to bring items into a combat theater from a point on the other side of the planet, if necessary. Aircraft which perform this role are considered strategic airlifters. This contrasts with tactical airlifters, such as the C-130 Hercules and Transall C-160, which can normally only move supplies within a given theater of operations. Examples of late current large strategic airlifters include:

- Airbus A400M Atlas
- Antonov An-124 Ruslan
- Antonov An-225 Mriya (Only model destroyed during the Battle of Antonov Airport)
- Boeing C-17 Globemaster III
- Ilyushin Il-76
- Lockheed C-5 Galaxy
- Xi'an Y-20

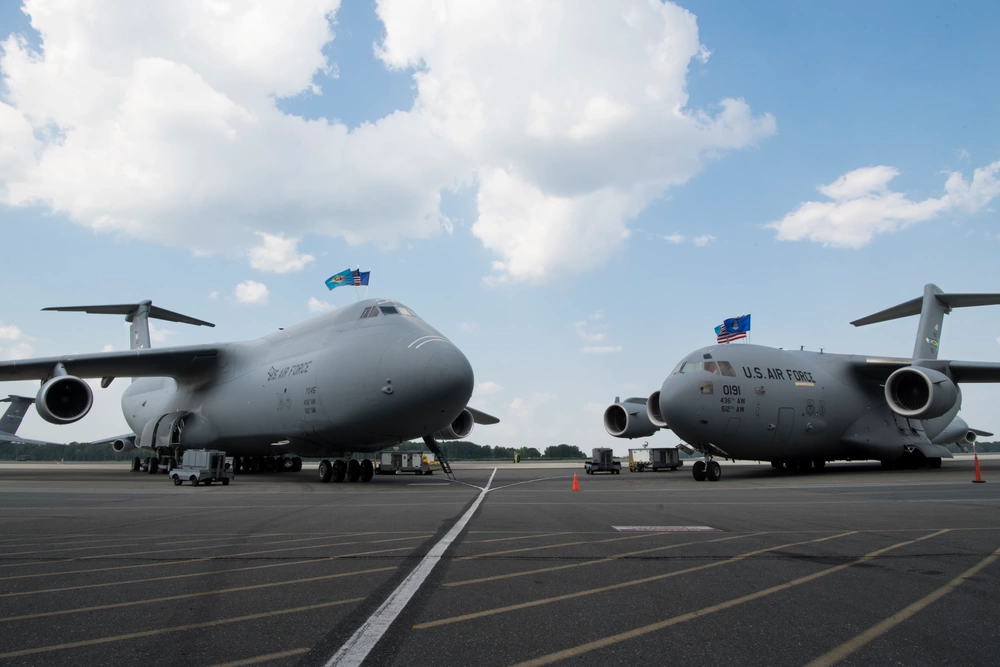
Lockheed C-5 Galaxy and Boeing C-17 Globemaster III of the United States Air Force.

However it is prohibitively expensive and impractical to shift a substantial mechanised force such as main battle tanks by air. For instance the M1 Abrams could only be carried by a C-5 Galaxy (two tanks) or a C-17 Globemaster III (one tank). This difficulty has prompted investment in lighter armoured fighting vehicles (such as the Stryker), as well as some preliminary research into alternative airlift technologies such as ground effect vehicles and airships. Civilian aircraft are also commonly used for transportation. For some civilian airlines, such as Volga-Dnepr Airlines, military contracts account for a large portion of their income.

== Tactical airlift ==
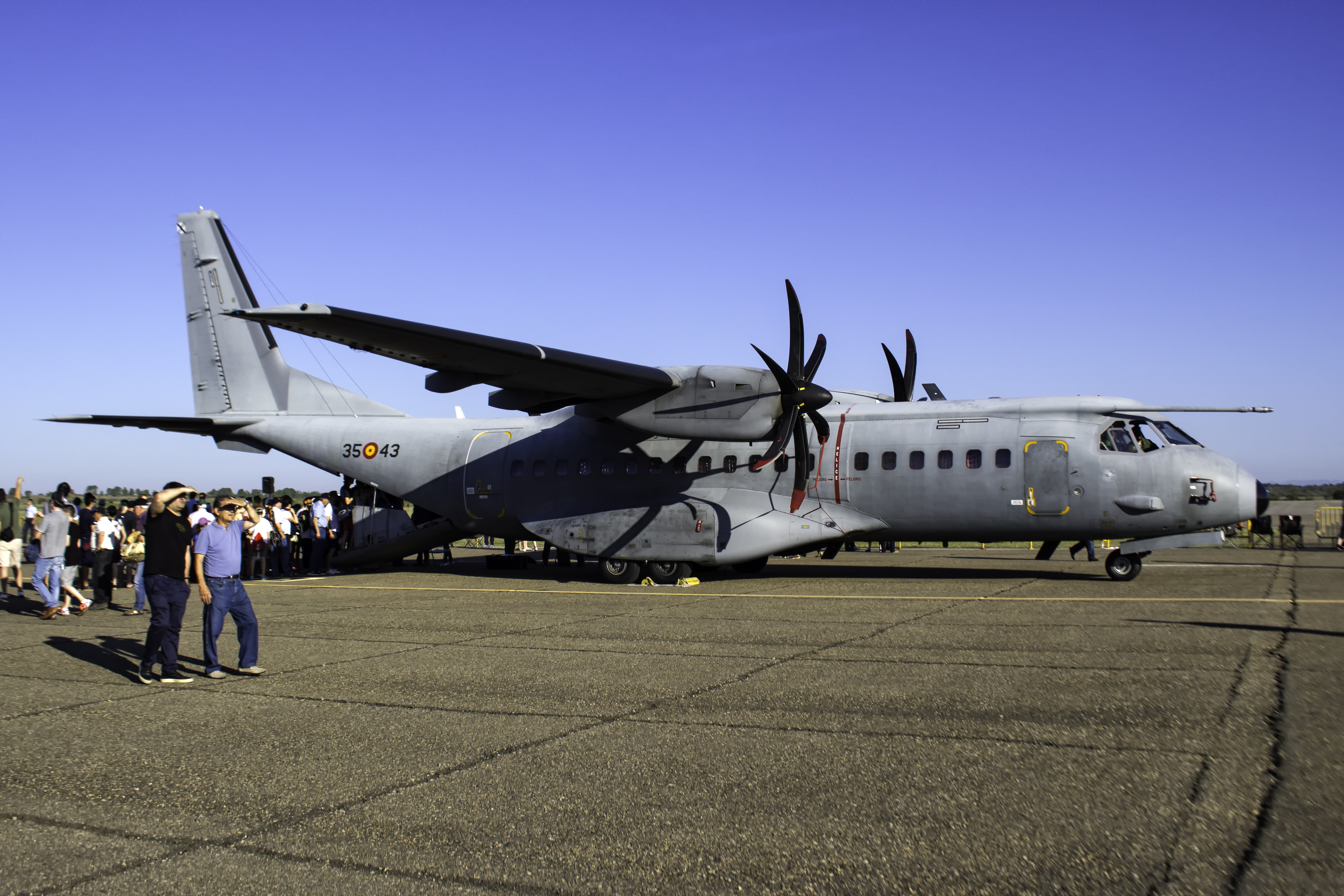
A Spanish Airbus C-295M tactical airlifter.

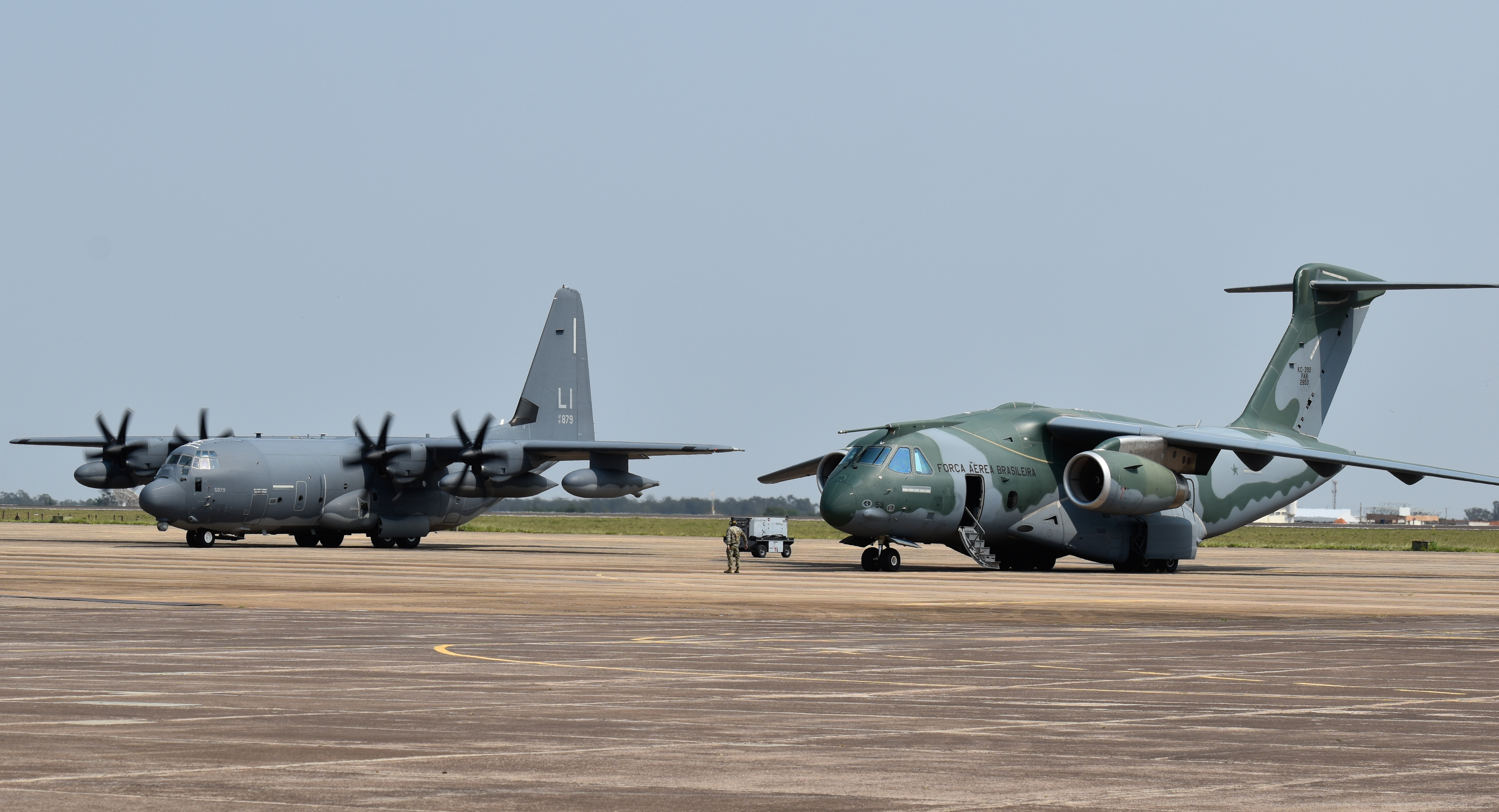
The C-130 and C-390 are major fixed-wing tactical airlifter platforms

Tactical airlift is a military term for the airborne transportation of supplies and equipment within a theatre of operations (in contrast to strategic airlift). Aircraft that perform this role are referred to as tactical airlifters. These are typically turboprop aircraft and feature short landing and take-off distances and low-pressure tires allowing operations from small or poorly prepared airstrips. While they lack the speed and range of strategic airlifters (which are typically jet-powered), these capabilities are invaluable within war zones. Larger military transport helicopters, such as the CH-47 Chinook and Mil Mi-26, can also be used to airlift personnel and equipment. Helicopters have the advantage that they do not require a landing strip and that equipment can often be suspended below the aircraft allowing it to be delivered without landing but are fuel inefficient and thus typically have limited range. Hybrid aircraft such as the Bell Boeing V-22 Osprey also exist which attempt to combine VTOL flight with greater range and speed.

Tactical airlift aircraft are designed to be maneuverable, allowing the low-altitude flight to avoid detection by radar and for the airdropping of supplies. Most are fitted with defensive aids systems to protect them from attack by surface-to-air missiles.

The earliest Soviet tactical airlift occurred in 1929, in which forty men of the Red Army were airlifted to the town of Garm, Tajikistan (then the Tajik Autonomous Soviet Socialist Republic) to repel an attacking force of Basmachi rebels under Fuzail Maksum.

Examples of late current large tactical airlifters include:

- Antonov An-12
- Antonov An-72
- Antonov An-70
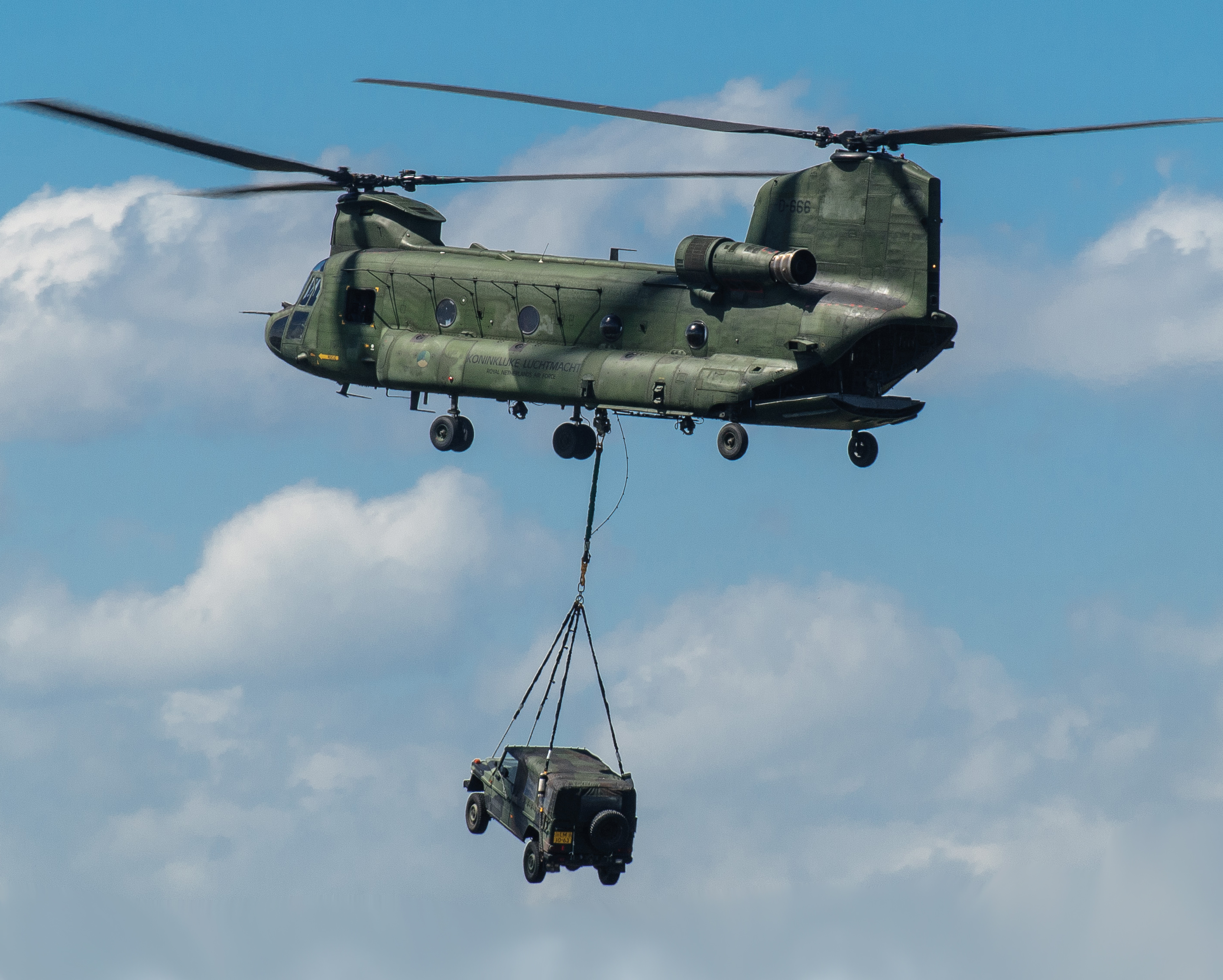
  A RNLAF CH-47D Chinook demonstrating tactical airlift capabilities
- Antonov An-178
- EADS CASA CN-235
- Airbus C295
- Alenia C-27J Spartan
- C-130J Super Hercules
- Transall C-160
- Kawasaki C-2
- Shaanxi Y-8
- Shaanxi Y-9
- Embraer KC-390

== Airlifter comparison ==
=== Recent platforms ===
Aircraft	Role	Max. payload (Kg)	Range (NM)	Cruise(Mach)	Ceiling (Ft.)	Price
Antonov An-72	Tactical	10,000	1,728 NM	Mach .68	36,089 Ft	$12.5m (est.)
C-130J Super Hercules	Tactical	19,050	2,380 NM	Mach .58	33,000 Ft	$ 52m (est.)
Antonov An-12	Tactical	20,000	1,940 NM	Mach .55	33,000 Ft	—
Shaanxi Y-8	Tactical	20,000	3,030 NM	Mach .45	34,000 Ft	—
Embraer KC-390	Tactical	26,000	3,140 NM	Mach .70	36,000 Ft	$ 50m (est.)
Shaanxi Y-9	Tactical	25,000	3,700 NM	Mach .53	34,120 Ft	—
Airbus A400M Atlas	Strategic/tactical	37,000	2,450 NM	Mach .72	37,000 Ft	€ 100m (est.)
Airbus C295	Tactical	9,250	2,100 NM	Mach .35	30,000 Ft	-
Kawasaki C-2	Strategic/tactical	37,600	3,000 NM	Mach .80	40,000 Ft	$ 120m (est.)
Antonov An-70	Tactical	47,000	1,621 NM	Mach .73	40,000 Ft	$ 80m (est.)
Ilyushin Il-76	Strategic/tactical	60,000	2,700 NM	Mach .70	42,700 Ft	$ 120m (est.)
Xian Y-20	Strategic	66,000	2,430 NM	Mach .75	42,700 Ft	—
C-17 Globemaster III	Strategic/tactical	77,520	2,380 NM	Mach .77	45,000 Ft	$ 225m
C-5 Galaxy	Strategic	122,472	2,400 NM	Mach .77	34,000 Ft	$ 168m
Antonov An-124	Strategic	150,000	2,808 NM	Mach .65	35,000 Ft	$70–100m
Antonov An-225	Strategic	250,000	2,159 NM	Mach .61	33,000 Ft	—

== See also ==
- Airbridge
- Airdrop
- Air cargo
- Berlin airlift
- Loss of Strength Gradient, a military concept
- Operation Nickel Grass, to Israel, 1973
- Power projection
- Sealift
- Hub-spoke distribution
