= May 2015 Nepal earthquake =

7.3 magnitude earthquake near Kodari, Nepal

- Location within Nepal
- UTC time: 2015-05-12 07:05:19
- ISC event: 610588278
- USGS-ANSS: ComCat
- Local date: 12 May 2015; 11 years ago
- Local time: 12:50:19 NST
- Magnitude: M_{w} 7.2–7.3
- Depth: 18.5 km (11.5 mi)
- Epicenter: 27.837°N 86.077°E
- Fault: Main Himalayan Thrust
- Type: Thrust
- Areas affected: Nepal; India; Bangladesh; China (Tibet)
- Max. intensity: MMI VII (Very strong)
- Aftershocks: 5.7 M_{w} on 2015-05-16 11:34:10 (UTC)
- Casualties: 218 dead 3,500+ injured

Aftershocks of 2015 Nepal earthquake

A major earthquake occurred in Nepal on 12 May 2015 at 12:50 pm local time (07:05 UTC) with a moment magnitude of 7.2–7.3, 18 kilometres (11 mi) southeast of Kodari. The epicenter was on the border of Dolakha and Sindhupalchowk, two districts of Nepal. This earthquake occurred on the same fault as the larger magnitude 7.8 earthquake of 25 April, but further east than the original quake. As such, it is considered to be an aftershock of the April quake. It struck at a depth of 18.5 km (11.5 mi). Shaking was felt in northern parts of India including Bihar, Uttar Pradesh and West Bengal. Tremors were felt as far as about 2,400 km away from the epicenter in Chennai.

Minutes later, another 6.3-magnitude earthquake hit Nepal with its epicenter in Ramechhap, east of Kathmandu. The earthquake was felt in Bangladesh, China and many other states in India. The impact of these tremors was felt even 1,000 kilometres away in the Indian capital New Delhi, where buildings shook and office workers evacuated.

== Damage and casualties ==
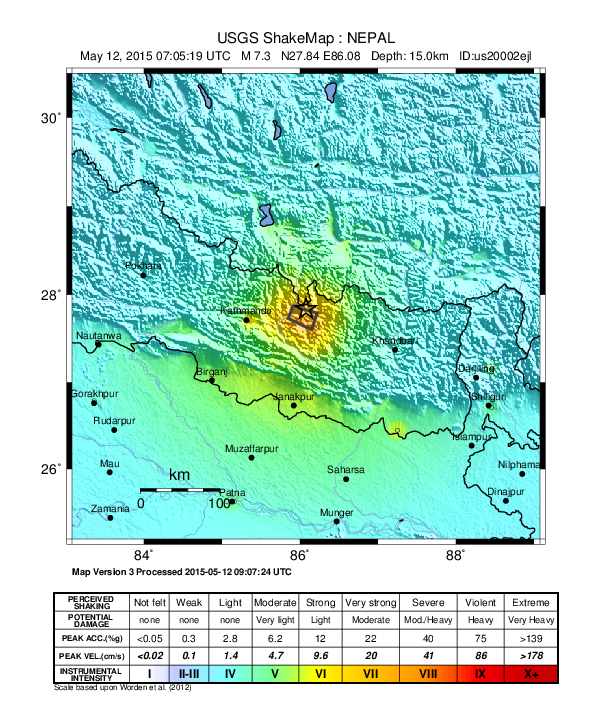
USGS ShakeMap

The aftershock caused mass panic as many people were living in the open air after the 25 April quake. "For the first seconds, it was complete silence. By the fifth second, everybody started to scream", said an eyewitness. "It was really, really intense. Even when the shaking stopped, people were still screaming". The tremor caused fresh landslides, and destroyed some buildings which survived the first quake.

In Nepal, at least 153 people were killed by the earthquake and more than 3,200 people were injured, primarily in mountain regions of the northeast. As of 15 May, 1,700 people were still receiving treatment for their injuries. Thirty-two of the nation's seventy-five districts were affected by the quake. In Kathmandu, the streets were quickly filled as people fled buildings. Within hours of the quake, tents began to fill open areas of the city as residents were afraid to go back inside. The district of Sindhupalchowk, which was also hit hard in the original quake, was among the worst-affected areas. Between the two quakes, 95% of the areas houses were destroyed. Areas around Mount Everest also saw fresh damage.

Casualties by country
Country	Deaths	Injuries	Ref.
Nepal	153	3,275	
India	62	~200	
Bangladesh	2	~150	
China	1	3	
Total	218	3,500+	

In India, Delhi Metro service was briefly interrupted as people fled their homes and places of employment. At least 17 people were killed by the quake in India. Sixteen of the deaths occurred in Bihar and one in Uttar Pradesh. One woman in the Tibet region of China was killed when falling rocks hit her car.

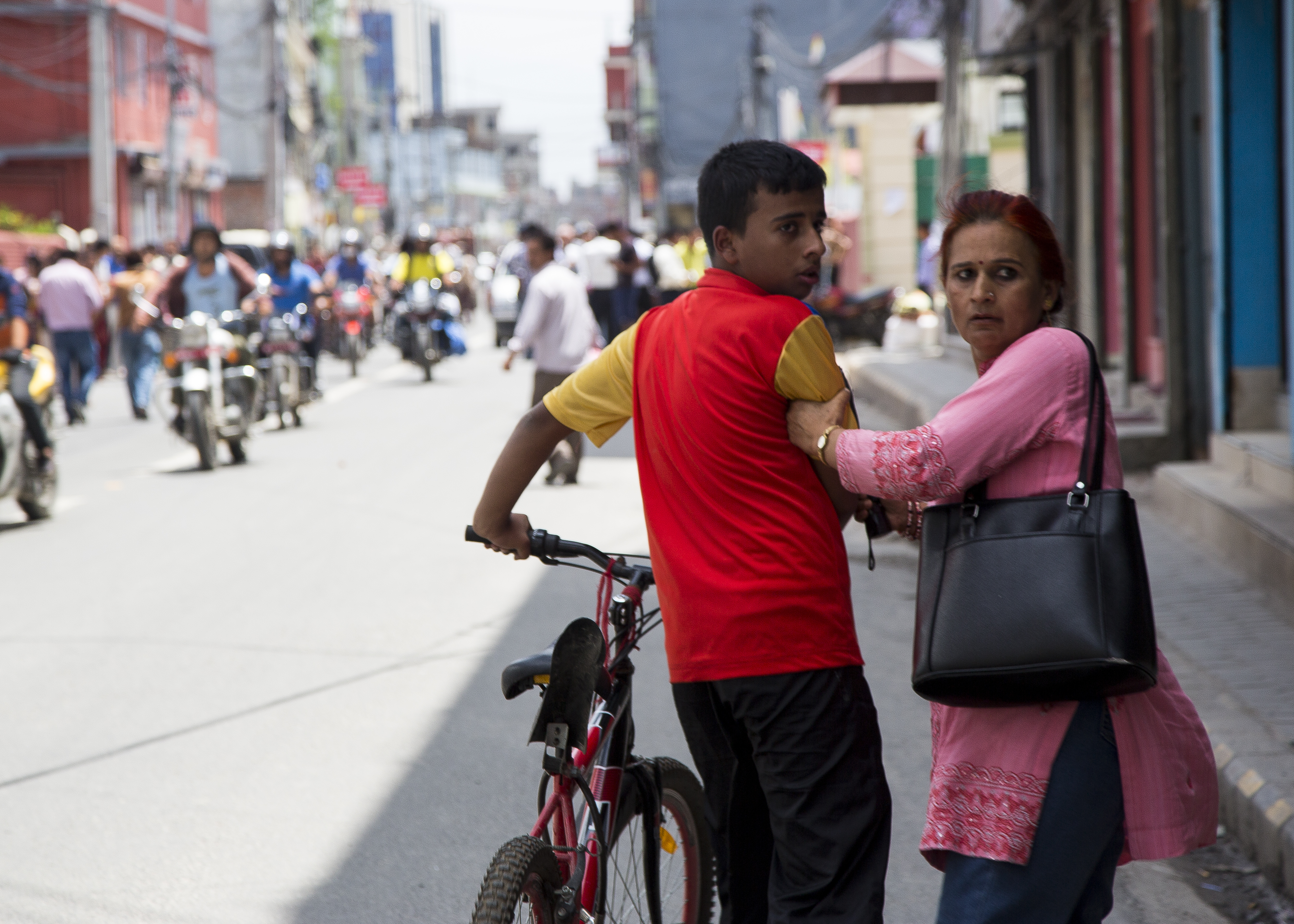
Nepalese reacting to the quake

A US military helicopter, UH-1 Huey, carrying six US Marines and two Nepalese soldiers, went missing when on a disaster relief operation in central Nepal. On 14 May the wreckage was found in burned condition in the Gorthali area. Three bodies were recovered from the crash site. On 16 May, when a total of eight bodies were recovered, the Pentagon spokesman Steve Warren said that although the cause of the crash was not yet known, a nearby Indian helicopter had heard radio chatter about a possible fuel problem.

== Rescue and relief ==
The Nepal Army continued its Operation Sankat Mochan to aid the affected population along with the Indian Army and delivered several tons of relief materials, and rescued stranded people.

According to geophysicist Amy Vaughan, the 12 May quake is likely a sign that more aftershocks are on the way. "Generally, in the days and weeks and months [seismic activity] tapers off", she said. "But ... this is going to temporarily increase [the aftershocks]".

== See also ==
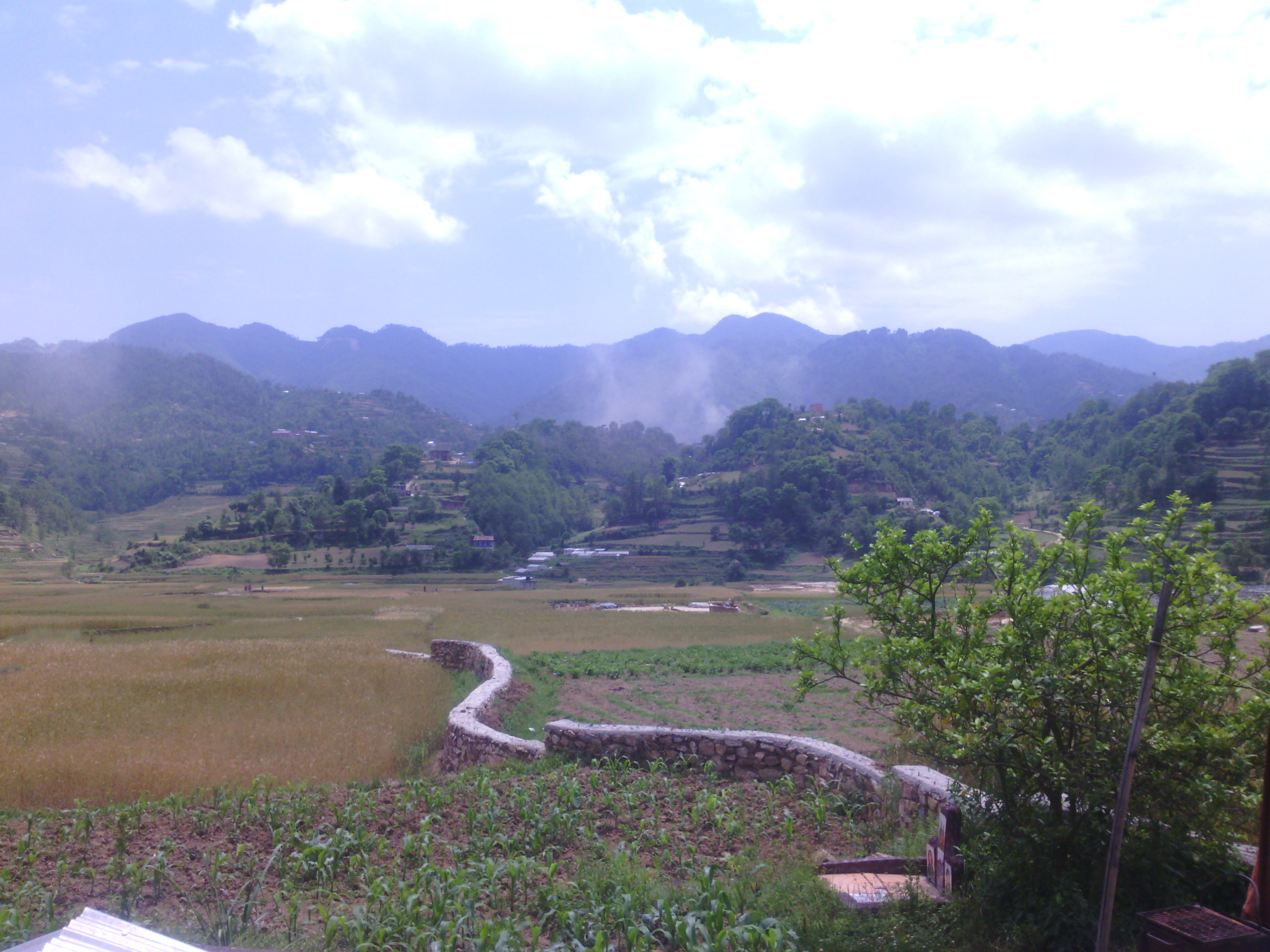
Dust clouds over villages 12 May 2015

- Geology of Nepal
- Geology of the Himalayas
- Humanitarian response to the 2015 Nepal earthquake
- Indian plate
- List of avalanches by death toll
- List of earthquakes in 2015
- List of earthquakes in Nepal
- Operation Maitri – the Indian Armed Forces earthquake relief operation
- Operation Sahayogi Haat
- Operation Sankat Mochan – the Nepal Army earthquake relief operation
- Thrust tectonics
