= Humanitarian response to the April 2015 Nepal earthquake =

An earthquake struck Nepal at 11:56:25 NST on 25 April 2015 with a moment magnitude of 7.8 (or 8.1M_{s}) and a maximum Mercalli intensity of IX (Violent). It was the most powerful earthquake to strike Nepal since the 1934 Nepal–Bihar earthquake. Many thousands of people died, with most casualties reported in Nepal (including Mount Everest), and adjoining areas of India, China, Bhutan and Bangladesh.

Within minutes of the earthquake, the Government of India, initiated Operation Maitri via the Indian Armed Forces, and created humanitarian missions with the primary objective of conducting relief and rescue operations in Nepal. Many countries and organizations donated aid, including China, the United Kingdom, and the United States, all of which provided or funded helicopters as requested by the Nepalese government. Numerous charitable organizations, such as UNICEF and Médecins Sans Frontières, delivered aid. Israel provided a large team of people to the relief effort in Nepal. Another earthquake, or major aftershock struck Nepal on 12 May 2015. A total of $3 billion was pledged by donors to help rebuild Nepal.

== India ==
=== 25 April: initial response ===
The Government of India was among the first to respond to the crisis by launching a full-fledged rescue and relief operation codenamed Operation Maitri. Within 15 minutes of the quake, Prime Minister Narendra Modi immediately ordered the dispatch of relief and rescue teams, including medical teams, to Nepal. By the afternoon ten teams from India's National Disaster Response Force, totaling 450 personnel and including several search and rescue dogs, arrived in Nepal; ten additional Indian Air Force planes departed to join them. In the immediate aftermath, India sent 43 tons of relief material, including tents and food. Modi spoke with Nepalese Prime Minister Sushil Koirala and assured him of India's support and assistance.

The Indian Army sent three military commanders led by Major General J. S. Sandhu to Nepal to coordinate, oversee, and fast-track the rescue, relief, and evacuation efforts. The Indian personnel worked closely with hundreds of retired Gorkha soldiers of the Indian Army. The Indian Air Force mobilised its Ilyushin Il-76, C-130J Hercules, Antonov An-32 and C-17 Globemaster transport aircraft and Mi-17 helicopters for Operation Maitri.

=== 26 April ===
The Indian Air Force evacuated over 500 citizens from Nepal between 25 and 26 April, and hundreds later on 26 April. Ten flights were scheduled for 26 April, which airlifted army forward hospitals, teams of doctors, nurses, and paramedics, engineering task forces, water, food, National Disaster Response Force teams, medical personnel and equipment, blankets, stretchers, and tents.

An Indian army mountaineering team recovered the bodies of 19 mountaineers from Everest base camp and rescued at least 61 stranded climbers on the mountain. Indian Air Force helicopters reached Everest on the morning of 26 April for rescue operations. Indian Foreign Secretary S. Jaishankar announced that six more National Disaster Response Force (NDRF) teams would be sent to Nepal in the next 48 hours, and that the aircraft sent to Nepal would not just rescue Indians, but citizens of other countries as well.

By nightfall, India dispatched a further 10 tons of blankets, 50 tons of water, 22 tons of food items, and 2 tons of medical supplies to Kathmandu. Nearly 1,000 NDRF personnel were assigned, and Indian citizens were evacuated by road. The government deployed 35 buses to evacuate stranded Indians in Nepal via two routes—Sonauli and Raxaul—along the Indo-Nepal border. India issued goodwill visas to foreigners stranded in Nepal and mobilised buses and ambulances to bring them to India by road. Indian Railways shipped 100,000 bottles of drinking water via the Air Force to be delivered as part of the relief effort. Railway Minister Suresh Prabhu later tweeted that there were arrangements being made to supply 100,000 bottles every day. Air India reduced fares on flights bound for Kathmandu from Delhi, Kolkata, and Varanasi, and announced that it would also carry relief material on its flights. Similarly, SpiceJet offered to accommodate "accredited NGOs and relief organizations looking to transport emergency supplies" and doctors free of charge.

=== 27 April ===
By Monday morning, the Indian Air Force evacuated 1,935 Indian citizens from Nepal using 12 aircraft sorties. Indian Army sources said six of 18 medical teams assigned to help with the relief efforts in Nepal had been deployed. The Indian Army sent ten engineer task forces with machinery to clear roads and debris. The troops took an additional 10,000 blankets with them, and 1,000 tents were on standby. The Indian army also brought oxygen cylinders to distribute to medical teams.

An inter-ministerial team comprising senior officials from the ministries of Home, Defence, External Affairs, and the National Disaster Management Authority (NDMA) went to Nepal to coordinate rescue and relief operations. The decision to send the high-level team was taken at a meeting chaired by Modi on 26 April. The team coordinated with the Nepalese government in damage assessment and rescue, relief, and salvage operations. India sent unmanned aerial vehicles (UAVs) to Kathmandu to map the destruction in Nepal and distribute resources effectively. The UAVs also located survivors in half-collapsed buildings, and were used to look through balconies or windows for trapped victims.

The Indian government sent teams of senior executives and engineers from state-run energy companies to Nepal to restore power lines and ensure uninterrupted fuel supplies. In the first phase, a team of five senior executives from the Indian Oil Corporation and more than a dozen engineers from the PowerGrid Corporation of India went to Nepal. By the end of 27 April, five tons of milk, light vehicles, a reverse osmosis plant, oxygen regenerators, medical supplies, blankets, tents, and 14 tons of food (ITC noodles) were sent to Nepal, and personnel including three NDRF teams, two field hospitals, and two Air Force communication centre vehicles were also dispatched. The Indian Air Force conducted extensive helicopter operations, rescuing at least 337 injured people and air-dropping 3.5 tons of relief materials in inaccessible places.

By the end of 27 April, approximately 5,400 Indian citizens were evacuated from Nepal; 30 foreign nationals were evacuated to India. The Indian government received requests for help from many countries and evacuated their citizens to India. Jaishankar announced that three additional NDRF teams were being sent to Nepal on Monday. The Indian Army Corps of Engineers repaired and reopened the road from Kathmandu to Pokhara. The Ministry of Defence established a satellite communication link between the Indian Army Corps of Engineers and the Nepalese Army Headquarters. The Indian Army set up a task force headquarters in Kathmandu under Major General Sandhu and another in Barpak under Brigadier Gamlin. The Indian Air Force sent four additional helicopters – four HAL Dhruv advanced light helicopters and two Cheetah helicopters – to Pokhara to expedite rescue efforts.

=== 28 April ===
By Tuesday, 28 April, India deployed 18 medical teams, three field hospitals, and two mobile teams of specialist doctors. With improving weather, the Indian Air Force and Indian Army spread out into remote areas while transporting essential items from various bases to Kathmandu and evacuating distressed persons to India. A 41-member medical team with medical supplies was sent to Nepal from Rajasthan. The Sashastra Seema Bal dispatched over three dozen vehicles, including ambulances and water tankers to Nepal from its border camps. The Indian government delivered 220 tons of food packets and dry rations, 50 tons of water, 2 tons of medicines, 40 tents, and 1,400 blankets to Nepal. The Indian Army established a 45-bed hospital at Lagankhel, Nepal, to treat those injured in the quake.

By the end of the day, India had evacuated 20,000 Indian citizens and 170 foreign nationals from Nepal. The foreign nationals included 4 people from Brazil, 20 from the Czech Republic, 5 from France, 8 from Germany, 1 from Mexico, 33 from Poland, 1 from Romania, 2 from Russia, 2 from South Africa, 71 from Spain, 1 from Switzerland, 4 from Tanzania, 3 from the United Kingdom, 5 from Ukraine, and 10 from the United States.

Despite their widespread help, India's relief operation was not without controversy. Citizens and media (local and international) accused the Indian Army of not deferring to Nepalese authority, carrying out relief operations at their own will without any coordination, and blocking the only international airport with their military cargo planes waiting to fly Indian citizens back home, which delayed aid and relief from other nations as their relief planes were grounded at various airports in India for days. Another report accused the Indian Army helicopters flying too close to China's no-fly zone with the intent of spying. Indian media faced a similar backlash for their insensitive reporting, which made the hashtag #GoHomeIndianMedia trend on Twitter.

== Other nations ==
=== Algeria ===
According to the Xinhua News Agency, Algeria dispatched 70 relief workers, medicines, and other supplies to Nepal.

=== Australia ===
Foreign Minister Julie Bishop announced an immediate AUD$5 million aid package of life-saving humanitarian support to Nepal consisting of $2.5 million to assist Australian non-government organisations, $2 million to support United Nations partners, and $500,000 to support the Australian Red Cross. Australia also dispatched two humanitarian experts and a crisis response team to the region.

=== Austria ===
Austria gave €750,000 to help with relief efforts in Nepal. The Austrian Red Cross sent several search and rescue staff to the region.

=== Azerbaijan ===
The Ministry of Emergency Situations sent one ton of drugs, medical supplies, tents, blankets, and packaged drinking water aboard Beriev Be-200 aircraft.

=== Bangladesh ===
Prime Minister Sheikh Hasina was dismayed by the deaths caused by the earthquake and dispatched a BAF Lockheed C-130B aircraft with 10 tonnes of relief materials, including tents, dry food, water, and blankets. The aircraft also carried a 34-member team consisting of six military medical teams and representatives of the Foreign Ministry. The aircraft dropped the teams off in Nepal and returned with 50 Bangladeshi citizens, including stranded women, minors and the visiting under-14 female football team.

Bangladesh provided at least 100,000 tons of rice and other relief materials including drinking water to help the earthquake victims in Nepal. Xinhua quoted Bangladeshi Agriculture Minister Matia Chowdhury as saying, "We will send more 50,000 metric tons of rice and other relief materials later". She also stated that Bangladeshi Food Minister Qamrul Islam had already been called for initiating an immediate measure in response to the earthquake, Bangladesh had been sending relief materials to Nepal regularly following the earthquake that killed at least 6,700 people, and that the country wanted to stand beside Nepal as it had played an important role in favor of Bangladesh's independence in 1971. Four cargo trucks carrying approximately 25 metric tons of essential relief materials for earthquake victims in Nepal left Dhaka on 27 April.

The cargo traveled through the Banglabandh-Fulbari-Panitanki-Kakarbhitta land route. Materials included 3,000 cartons of dry food and fruit juice donated by local organisation Pran, and 5,000 pieces of blankets donated by leading development organisation BRAC. Some of the materials were donated by various private companies, charitable organisations, and educational institutions, and others were collected by Nepalese and Bangladeshi volunteers.

=== Belgium ===
Belgium offered search and rescue teams to Nepal.

=== Bhutan ===
Bhutanese Prime Minister Tshering Tobgay expressed his condolences and solidarity with the people of Nepal through social media. Economic Affairs Minister Norbu Wangchuk also conveyed condolences, and announced the suspension of World Intellectual Property Day celebrations in solidarity with the Nepali, and that there was no major damage in Bhutan. Under the command of the Bhutanese King Jigme Khesar Namgyel Wangchuck, a medical team of 63 personnel led by Tobgay and the health minister arrived in Kathmandu. Bhutan provided a rehabilitation fund of Nu.62 million (US$1 million). Bhutan's national flag flew at half mast to mourn the loss of lives caused by the earthquake.

=== Brazil ===
The Brazilian Ministry of External Relations released a note expressing "deep sadness" and conveyed its "condolences and solidarity to the families of the victims, the people and the Government of Nepal".

=== Brunei ===
Brunei sent eight-man relief contingents, comprising two doctors and four paramedics from the Royal Brunei Armed Forces and Brunei's Gurkha Reserve Unit.

=== Bulgaria ===
President Rosen Plevneliev conveyed his condolences to the earthquake victims on behalf of Bulgaria.

=== Canada ===
Prime Minister Stephen Harper issued a statement offering "heartfelt condolences to the people of Nepal and northern India", and "wish[ing] a speedy recovery to all those injured". The statement clarified that Canadian officials in the region were "working with Nepalese and Indian authorities" to locate and ensure the safety of any Canadians in the area, while also "cooperat[ing] with international partners [to] assess the needs of the affected populations to determine how Canada may most effectively assist with the disaster". Foreign Affairs Minister Rob Nicholson asserted that "Canada will do everything it can to assist", and said the country was contributing CAD $5 million to the relief efforts. A Disaster Assistance Response Team advance group, consisting of 30 experts, departed for Nepal on the evening of 26 April. Many Canadian humanitarian organizations pledged to contribute to the relief efforts, and several community groups commenced active fundraising for Nepal. On 27 April, the federal government announced that it would "match – dollar-for-dollar – all eligible contributions" made to the newly established Nepal Earthquake Relief Fund retroactively from 26 April until 25 May, and "offered to expedite immigration applications from the devastated region, … as well as extend student, work or visitor visas for Nepalese".

The same day, the country's most populous province – Ontario – pledged CAD $1 million to the Canadian Red Cross, and a Boeing C-17 military transport took off loaded with additional emergency supplies – "including blankets, jerry cans, kitchen sets, hygiene kits, and tarps" – from the nation's own stockpiles. By the evening of 27 April, 150 Canadian troops were on standby for deployment to the afflicted region. At the time of the earthquake, 462 Canadians were registered as being in Nepal; the exact number in the country is unclear since traveler registration with the Canadian government is voluntary.

=== China ===
Premier Li Keqiang of China sent messages of condolence to Koirala and pledged to offer assistance. Xi Jinping, the general secretary of the Chinese Communist Party, sent his condolences to Nepalese President Ram Baran Yadav and pledged to offer assistance, asserting that China was "willing to offer all necessary disaster assistance". The China International Search and Rescue Team sent 62 rescuers and six sniffer dogs to Nepal the day after the earthquake. A separate 58-member Chinese medical team arrived on 27 April with 13 tons of medical aid. On 26 April, the Chinese government announced it would provide CN¥20 million (US$3.3 million) in humanitarian aid in the form of tents, blankets, and medicine. The Chinese embassy in Nepal launched an emergency response mechanism to help Chinese nationals injured in the disaster. Chinese helicopters aided in the response.

==== Hong Kong ====
Chief Executive Leung Chun-ying sent a letter of condolence to Yadav to express his deepest sympathies to the victims of the disastrous earthquake in Nepal on behalf of Hong Kong.

On 28 April, the Hong Kong government announced they would apply for a supplementary provision of HKD$50 million (equivalent to US$6.45 million) from the Finance Committee of the territory's Legislative Council (LegCo) to donate to the Disaster Relief Fund as their contribution. The chairperson of the Finance Committee of the LegCo, Tommy Cheung of the Liberal Party, announced on 30 April that the provision had been passed by circulation without going through the normal procedure of an open meeting.

The Immigration Department sent three immigration officers to Kathmandu to locate Hong Kongers reported to be missing.

Chief Executive of World Vision Hong Kong, Kevin Chiu, said they had raised HKD$10 million (US$1.29 million) and would apply for HKD$7 million (US$967,478) from the Disaster Relief Fund of the Hong Kong Government. The money would be used to provide victims with tents, tarpaulins, solar-powered lights, and other necessities.

=== Colombia ===
The president of Colombia, Juan Manuel Santos, expressed total solidarity with the people of Nepal and assured them that aid would be sent.

=== Czech Republic ===
The Government of the Czech Republic said they were giving to Nepal CZK 20 million (US$791,378) in aid and sent the disaster response team in Melamchi, including 36 medicals and 13 firefighters, for a month. Foreign Minister Lubomír Zaorálek expressed his deepest condolences to families and friends of victims. As many as 20 stranded nationals of the Czech Republic were evacuated from Nepal.

=== Denmark ===
The government sent DKK 5 million to Nepal, and Development Minister Mogens Jensen indicated that additional aid would be forthcoming. "It is a terrible situation for … one of the world's poorest countries", he observed, "Therefore it is important for us to be there with support and help." Jensen added that Denmark is "clearly ready to contribute more if there is a need for it". On top of the official aid, multiple Danish humanitarian organizations raised funds for Nepal.

=== Egypt ===
Egypt's government expressed condolences to Nepal's government and people in an official statement, stressing that it stood with Nepal in its diversity, paid respect to the victims, and wished the wounded people a rapid recovery.

=== Estonia ===
The Estonian Disaster Relief Team dispatched a team of 15 rescue workers and medics. The rescuers could not be deployed because the Finnish airplane that was to depart along with Finnish rescuers was denied permission to land by Nepali authorities. The government started a fundraising campaign.

=== Finland ===
The Government of Finland donated €3 million to help earthquake victims. The Finnish Red Cross launched a fundraising campaign for Nepal and sent a team of relief workers along with medical and logistical supplies to the region to assist with recovery operations.

=== France ===
On 25 April, the government of France expressed solidarity with the people and government of Nepal. A crisis centre was set up at France's Foreign Ministry, and a reinforcement team sent to New Delhi. On 26 April 2015, Minister of Foreign Affairs and International Development Laurent Fabius announced that an initial mission of 11 rescuers plus equipment and supplies was departing for Kathmandu that morning. Additional assistance would follow according to the needs and demands of local authorities and NGOs.

=== Germany ===
On the day of the quake, the government of Germany pledged to provide assistance. On 3 May, a team of 52 German relief workers – including physicians, expert searchers, and multiple dog squads – landed in Nepal with a mobile medical treatment centre. The German Federal Agency for Technical Relief deployed its Rapid Deployment Unit Water and Sanitation Abroad to Nepal on 26 April.

=== Greece ===
Greece offered search and rescue teams to Nepal.

=== Hungary ===
President János Áder expressed "sympathy and condolences" to the people of Nepal and Yadav.

The Foreign Ministry donated HUF 300 million ($1 million) for emergency aid.

=== Indonesia ===
President Joko Widodo indicated that Indonesian preparations to assist Nepal were in progress, and that the country would send SAR and medical teams to Nepal as soon as the Tribhuvan International Airport reopened. On 27 April 2015, the President announced that Indonesia would be donating US$2 million to the relief efforts. On 29 April 2015, The teams flew on a military plane from Jakarta to Kathmandu with 66 personnel and 6 tons of relief supplies. The plane was scheduled to arrive on 30 April with a stopover in Dhaka, Bangladesh.

=== Iran ===
President Hassan Rouhani offered "sympathy and condolences" to Nepal, and wished for a swift recovery of the injured and patience for the bereaved families. Foreign Ministry spokeswoman Marzieh Afkham also expressed sympathy with the Nepalese government and nation over the deadly earthquake that hit the country earlier in the day, offering condolences to the families of the victims and wishing immediate recovery to those injured in the disaster. The Iranian Red Crescent Society declared its readiness to assist and to cooperate with the Nepal Red Cross Society. Iran's Red Crescent Society prepared a 40-ton humanitarian relief package to dispatch to Nepal; however, due to the critical conditions of the Kathmandu Airport, the package was delivered through one of the neighboring countries.

=== Ireland ===
Ireland's Department of Foreign Affairs and Trade initially said that the families of at least 51 Irish citizens in Nepal could contact them and that they were working to contact them all.

€1 million were donated for relief.

=== Israel ===
Prime Minister Benjamin Netanyahu dispatched a search and rescue team that included physicians to Nepal, and expressed Israel's willingness to assist in any way possible. Interior Minister Gilad Erdan also affirmed that Israel would assist the families of 24 surrogate babies, nine of them born prematurely, by evacuating them to India and flying them to Israel to continue necessary medical procedures. On 26 April, two El Al Boeing 747-400 jumbo jets carrying an Israel Defense Forces search and rescue delegation, with medical elements and necessary equipment, were dispatched to Nepal. The return flights carried survivors along with the surrogate infants. Three IAF C-130 Hercules planes left for Nepal on 27 April, with 260 personnel on board, and transported 95 tons of equipment including a field hospital with a ward for premature babies, cutting equipment, electronic devices to help find victims trapped under the rubble, generators, and lighting equipment. They also treated psychological trauma with the help of clowns who danced, sang, told stories, shared toys, and joked with affected children.

Israel's aid team to Nepal was the largest in manpower of any international aid mission.

=== Italy ===
The Foreign Ministry made €300,000 available for emergency aid to Nepal.

=== Japan ===
Within half a day of the quake, Japan's government offered emergency assistance. The Japan International Cooperation Agency (JICA) sent 70 experts. The team included experts from the Japanese Ministry of Foreign Affairs, the National Police Agency, and JICA, along with rescuers, search and rescue dog handlers, communication specialists, physicians, and field coordinators. JICA sent emergency relief supplies worth ¥25 million.

=== South Korea ===
The spokesperson of the Foreign Ministry extended its condolences to the victims and their families, and pledged to immediately donate US$1 million, along with a possible rescue team dispatched to assist in rescue missions. On 27 April, the South Korean government announced that it would send 40 search and rescue workers to Nepal.

=== Kuwait ===
On 26 April, Sheikh Sabah Al-Ahmad Al-Jaber Al-Sabah, Emir of Kuwait, contacted Yadav to express his sorrow over the devastation in Nepal, and sent his condolences. The Crown Prince of Kuwait, Sheikh Nawaf Al-Ahmad Al-Jaber Al-Sabah, and the Prime Minister, Sheikh Jaber Al-Mubarak Al-Hamad Al-Sabah, sent similar messages.

=== Latvia ===
On 25 April, the Latvian Ministry of Foreign Affairs, in conjunction with Latvian senior officials, extended "deepest condolences [and] sympathies", and "wish[ed] for a rapid recovery" to the people and government of Nepal.

=== Lithuania ===
President Dalia Grybauskaitė and Prime Minister Algirdas Butkevičius offered their condolences and solidarity with the people of Nepal. The Ministry of Foreign Affairs announced that there were at least 60 Lithuanian citizens in Nepal during the earthquake, and that ministry officials were working to contact them.

=== Malaysia ===
Foreign Minister Anifah Aman said his country was ready to extend assistance to Nepal once access to the Tribhuvan International Airport has been restored. Later, government announced that Malaysia would send 20 medical doctors from Mercy Malaysia along with a 30-man rescue team from the Special Malaysia Disaster Assistance and Rescue Team with medicine and medical supplies to Kathmandu by C-130 aircraft. The aircraft stood by to evacuate all Malaysians in the region to Kuala Lumpur.

=== Mexico ===
On the day of the quake, the government of Mexico pledged to provide assistance. Mexico's Red Cross group, the Embassy of Mexico in Nepal, along with several non-governmental groups like Topos de Tlatelolco, UNICEF México, Cadena México, and Oxfam México, provided aid.

=== Monaco ===
On the day of the quake, the Monegasque government indicated it would send aid to Nepal "in the coming hours".

=== Netherlands ===
The Dutch Urban Search and Rescue Team mobilised a 62-human and 8-dog contingent accompanied by a cohort of Dutch physicians, nurses, and engineers, as well as 5 tons of relief supplies, on 28 April to send to Nepal. The Netherlands' €4 million financial contribution was managed by the Dutch Relief Alliance.

=== New Zealand ===
New Zealand sent an initial NZD$1 million in humanitarian aid, and mobilised 45 urban search and rescue technicians.

=== Norway ===
The Ministry of Foreign Affairs indicated that Norway would contribute NOK 30 million to Nepal.

=== Pakistan ===
In an immediate statement issued by the Foreign Ministry, Prime Minister Nawaz Sharif expressed "his deep shock at the reports of massive earthquake that has caused devastation in Nepal and Northern India this morning" and, on behalf of Pakistan, expressed "heartfelt condolences and sympathies ... on the tragedy that has caused loss of precious lives and properties". The statement also indicated that Pakistan's diplomatic missions in India and Nepal had been directed "to approach their respective host governments to ascertain the damages caused and the requirement of relief assistance", while the National Disaster Management Authority (NDMA) of Pakistan stood by. Sharif conversed with Koirala and offered humanitarian assistance following the midday earthquake.

Later that day, Pakistan announced that it was sending the PAF's four Lockheed C-130 planes packed with life-saving emergency equipment – including a 30-bed hospital, 2,000 military meals, 600 blankets, 200 tents, and other assorted relief items – along with military emergency personnel including army doctors, medical staff, and the combined ERRA-NDMA's special search and rescue teams with sniffer dogs. In a field visit, the chief of the Nepalese Army expressed his gratitude towards the Government of Pakistan and Pakistan Army's response to the disaster, and personally thanked them, saying "Kathmandu will remember Pakistan's help". The aid sent created controversy in Nepal as it included packets of beef masala, beef being proscribed in Hindu religion and hence banned in Nepal.

=== Palestine ===
President Mahmoud Abbas offered his condolences to Yadav. Abbas expressed his and the Palestinian people's solidarity with the families of the victims, and expressed wishes for a speedy recovery for the wounded, affirming the Palestinian side's willingness to provide all possible help.

=== Philippines ===
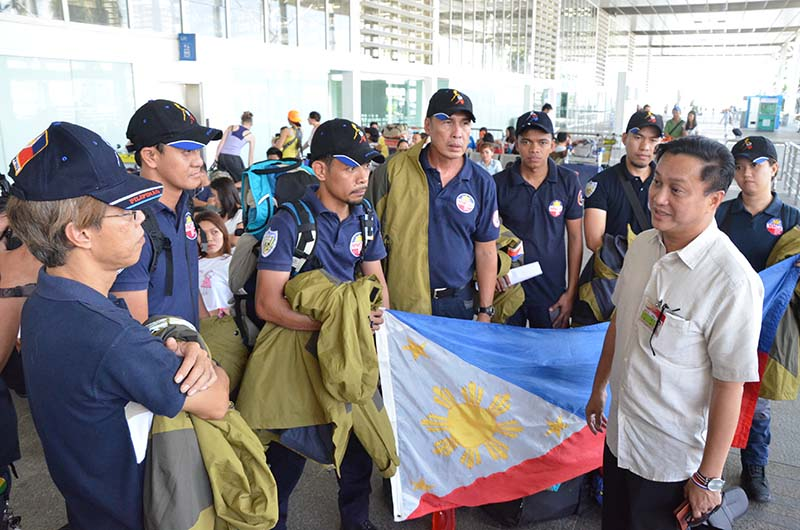
The MMDA Probe and Retrieval Team sent off to Nepal to assist in the relief efforts.

President Benigno Aquino III issued a statement: "Time and again, the world has come together to render assistance in times of dire need: Filipinos from all walks of life have likewise expressed sympathy and offered prayers for the Nepalese people." Aquino directed the Department of Foreign Affairs to send a team from the Philippine embassy in New Delhi, India, to go to Nepal and meet the needs of Filipinos affected by the earthquake. The Philippine Red Cross sent staff and volunteers to Nepal in response to the earthquake.

=== Poland ===
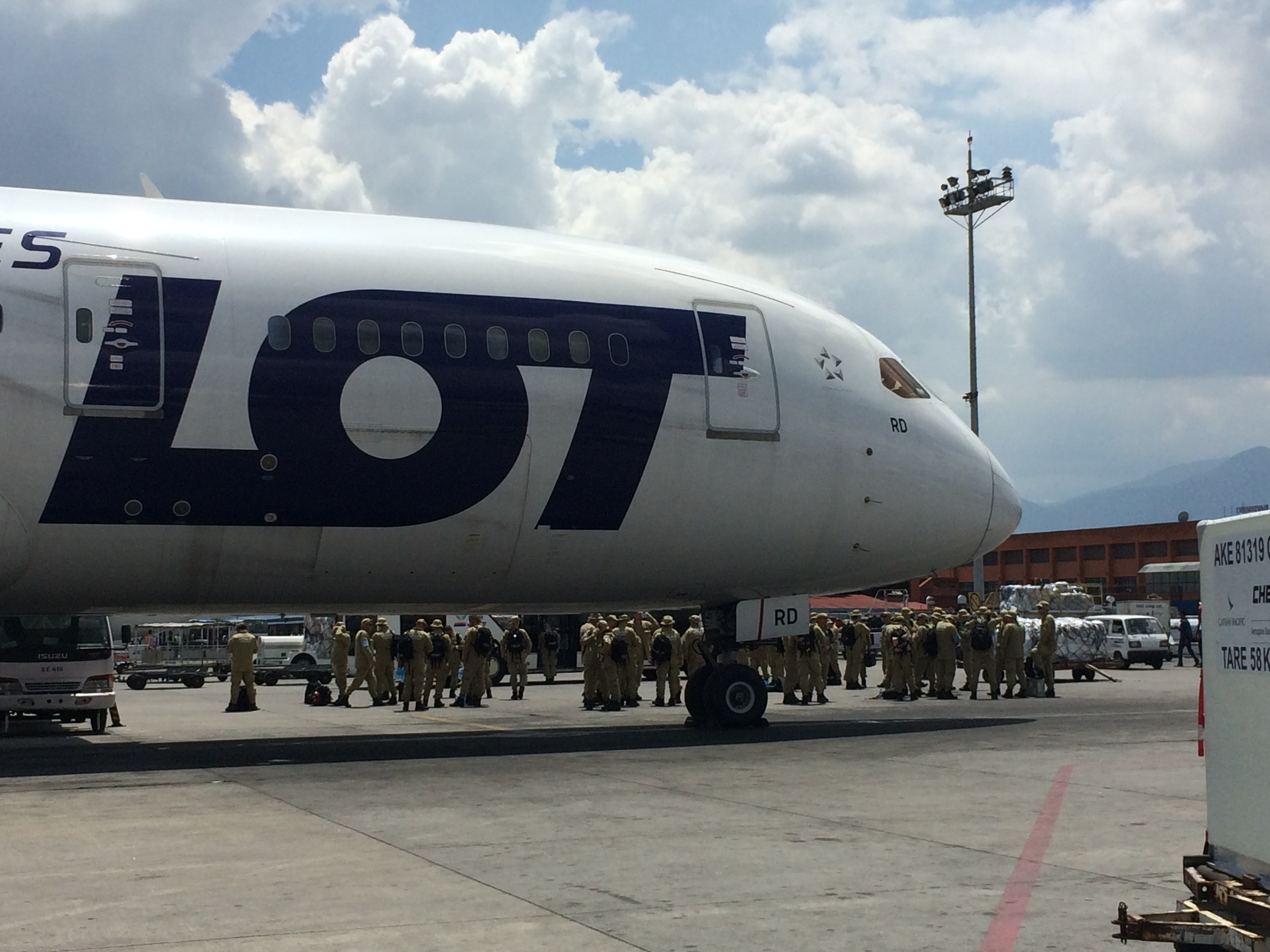
Polish rescue team at Kathmandu airport apron

Poland sent 81 firefighters of the State Fire Service, 12 search and rescue dogs, and 6 doctors of the Polish Center for International Aid. On 28 April, 33 Polish citizens were evacuated by the Indian Air Force.

=== Portugal ===
Portuguese footballer Cristiano Ronaldo expressed his solidarity with Nepal and Nepalis as relief to the survivors of the April 25 Nepal earthquake.

The Portuguese NGO, International Medical Assistance Foundation (Fundação Assistência Médica Internacional) offered €200,000 to help the victims of the earthquake.

=== Qatar ===
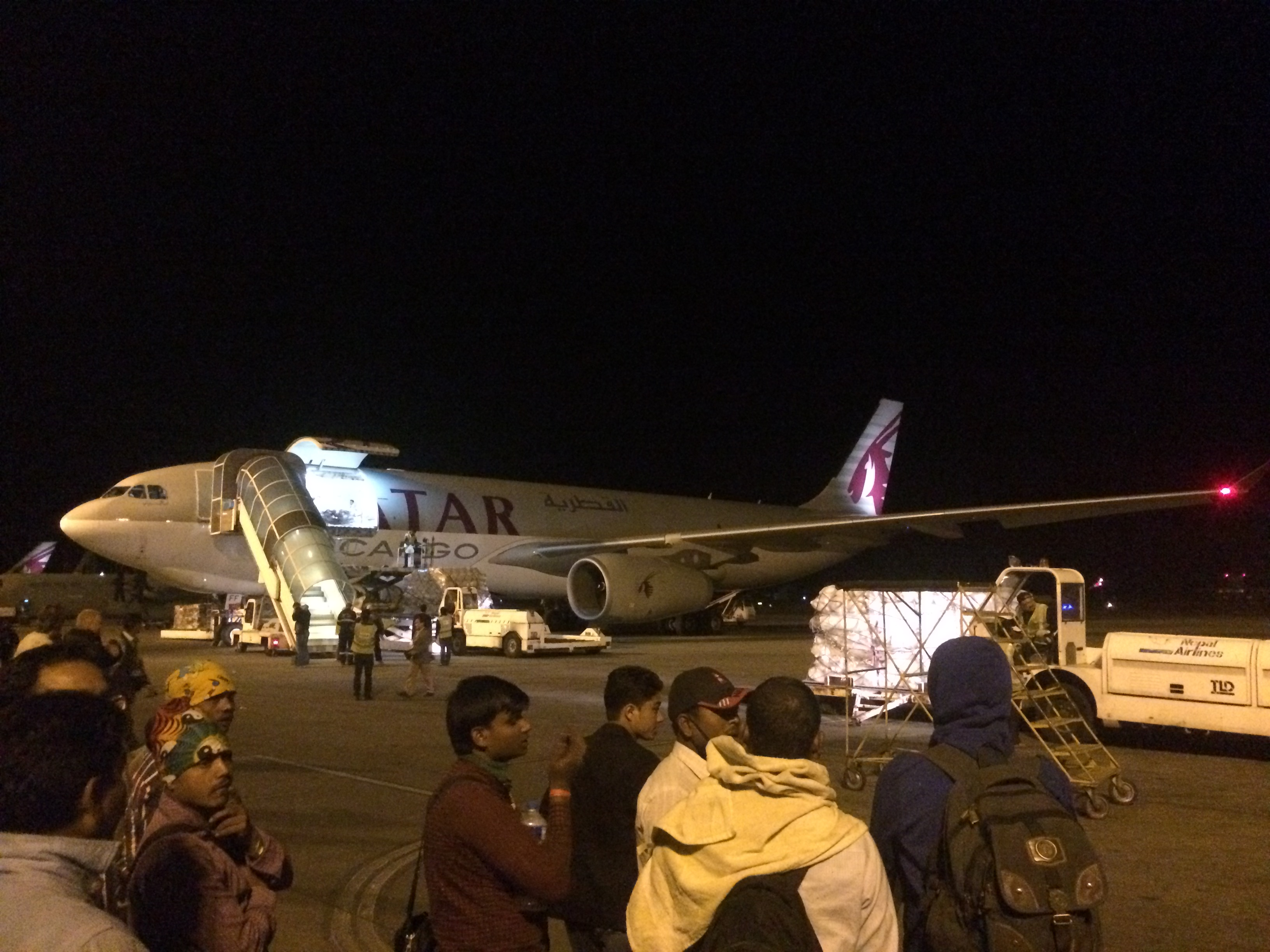
Qatar Airways Cargo Airbus A330-200F providing humanitarian support after the 2015 Nepal earthquake.

Two aircraft laden with Qatari aid materials left on 26 April from Doha, reported the Qatar News Agency. Each plane carried 60 tonnes of relief materials including foodstuffs, medicines, power generators and tents. Two other aircraft left on 27 April with 120 tonnes of relief materials, in addition to a field hospital provided by Qatari Red Crescent (QRC) to deliver medical aid. The Standing Committee of Emergency, Rescue, Relief and Humanitarian Aid, headed by Lekhwiya, prepared relief materials and coordinated with the authorities. On 25 April, QRC issued an emergency appeal to raise QAR 12 million for the relief of Nepal earthquake victims, and allocated QAR 1 million for emergency relief operations concerning health, sheltering, water, sanitation, and reuniting families.

=== Romania ===
President Klaus Iohannis expressed his condolences with the people affected by the earthquake, stating that Romania would join the other countries of the world who expressed solidarity with the affected countries.

=== Russia ===
President Vladimir Putin expressed condolences to Yadav. Russia's Ministry for Emergency Situations offered aid to Nepal in addressing the aftermath, and assembled a team of over 50 rescue workers with "expansive experience of operations in … areas struck by earthquakes", including China, Haiti, and Turkey. The team was supplied with "top-notch equipment enabling it to work autonomously", and departed for Nepal.

=== Serbia ===
Prime Minister Aleksandar Vučić sent his "deepest condolences … [o]n behalf of the government and the people of the Republic of Serbia" to the Prime Minister of Nepal, asserting that "[t]he Republic of Nepal and [its] citizens can always count on the sincere and friendly support of the Republic of Serbia".

=== Singapore ===
Prime Minister Lee Hsien Loong wrote a letter of condolence to Koirala and dispatched a search and rescue team consisting of 55 members of the Singapore Civil Defence Force, and officers from Singapore Police Force and the Gurkha Contingent. Singapore also deployed disaster relief teams to the area. Another relief team departed Singapore on 27 April. The government of Singapore "kick-started" the Singapore Red Cross's disaster relief drive with a contribution of SGD$100,000.

=== Slovenia ===
The Government of Slovenia decided on 29 April 2015 to give €50,000 in direct financial aid to Nepal following the catastrophic earthquake in the country. The funds were secured from the budget reserves and provided through UNICEF. The decision was announced by Prime Minister Miro Cerar, who added that Slovenia was also open to other forms of assistance.

=== South Africa ===
On 25 April, the Department of International Relations and Cooperation confirmed that all South Africans in Nepal were accounted for and safe. The next day, President Jacob Zuma sent his condolences to the people and government of Nepal.

A search and rescue team with dogs from the South African Police Service was deployed to Nepal.

=== Spain ===
On the day of the quake, the Spanish government pledged to provide assistance. On Monday, Spain officially sought India's help in evacuating its citizens from Nepal. Modi assured the Spanish Foreign Minister that India would provide all possible help to Spanish nationals in Nepal. By 28 April, as many as 71 Spanish citizens were safely evacuated by Indian military personnel.

=== Sri Lanka ===
The Government of Sri Lanka provided emergency relief. On 25 April, special Sri Lanka Air Force C-130 Hercules flights departed for Nepal with a stock of emergency relief supplies, medicine, and groups of specialist physicians and other medical staff. As of 26 April, the nation sent 44 military personnel and 4 medical consultants; they were followed by a team of 156 persons – including 11 airmen, 4 medical consultants, and 14 sailors – and an aircraft full of food supplies.

On 29 April, A SriLankan Airlines Airbus A330 flight departed with 97 service personnel comprised 72 Army personnel, 14 Navy personnel, and 11 Air Force personnel. The group took a consignment of 17 tons of supplies including medicine, water bottles, dry rations, and water purification tablets.

=== Sweden ===
Sweden gave US$1.5 million to help with relief efforts. It also sent 60 search and rescue staff along with dogs to the region on 27 April.

=== Switzerland ===
On 26 April, a team of experts – including a physician, a building surveyor, and a water quality technician – were dispatched to Nepal.

=== Taiwan ===
The Taiwanese government donated US$300,000 to Nepal. Executive Yuan spokesman Sun Lih-chyun expressed Taiwan's willingness to help with the rescue and research efforts in Nepal.

=== Thailand ===
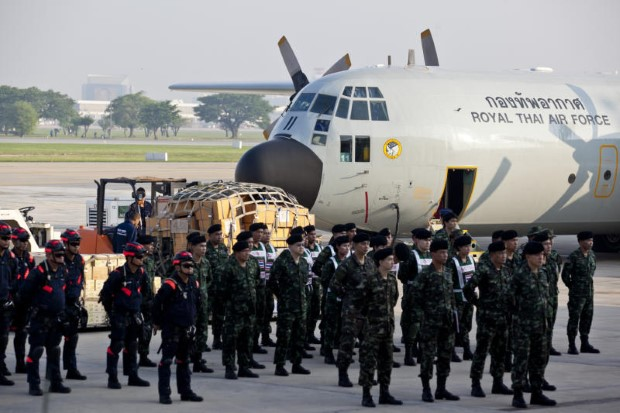
Royal Thai Army personnel and rescue worker briefing before boarding a C-130H at Donmuang Airport.

Prime Minister Prayut Chan-o-cha ordered the dispatch of medic teams and rescue teams from the Ministry of Public Health and Royal Thai Armed Forces. On 28 April, one Royal Thai Air Force Lockheed C-130 was flown to Kathmandu with army personnel and medics to assess for further aid. It escorted 64 Thais back to Bangkok. On 30 April, two more C-130s were dispatched with 11 tonnes of supplies (of which included tents, canvas, field table sets, drinking water, canned fish, medicine and medical equipment, blankets, water filters, survival gear and saline solution), 67 army personnel, medics and relief and rescue worker. In addition to efforts undertaken by the government, King Bhumibol and Queen Sirikit of Thailand donated TH฿10 million (approximately US$300,000) through the Rajaprajanugroh Foundation. A Royal Thai Air Force spokesman later disclosed that Princess Sirindhorn ordered 5 tonnes of tents, blankets, cushions, gas stoves and medicine to be sent to Nepal by air force carriers on the morning of 4 May to be distributed by the Thai medical camp set up in Kathmandu. A cumulative donation of TH฿106 million (US$3.2 million) was collected from willing philanthropists on the same day. The Royal Thai Navy materially assisted relief efforts.

=== Tunisia ===
The president of the Ennahda Movement presented its condolences to Nepal. They asked people to donate and help the Nepalese people, called on the state to participate in the rescue efforts, and asked international forces to assume their responsibility in relief Nepal.

=== Turkey ===
The Turkish Foreign Ministry offered its condolences, and launched efforts to provide humanitarian assistance. Turkish aid agencies sent a search and rescue team made up of 65 people to Nepal.

=== United Arab Emirates ===
On the day of the quake, UAE President Sheikh Khalifa sent his condolences to Yadav; the nation's vice president, Sheikh Mohammed bin Rashid, also conveyed his sympathies. On 26 April, the Ministry of Interior sent an 88-member search and rescue team led by the director of Abu Dhabi Civil Defence, Lt. Col. Mohammed Al Ansari, to Nepal. The team met with UN Disaster Assessment and Coordination staff on site. A second UAE team traveled to India to purchase medical and food supplies that was airlifted to Nepal. The chairwoman of the General Women's Union, Sheikha Fatima bint Mubarak, donated DH 5 million towards relief to quake victims.

=== United Kingdom ===
Prime Minister David Cameron expressed condolences and offered assistance to Nepal. The United Kingdom government provided 30 tonnes of humanitarian aid and 8 tonnes of equipment, coordinated by the Department for International Development, which formed part of a £33 million ($51 million) aid package, the third largest bilateral aid contribution after India and China. The UK provided around 100 search and rescue responders, medical experts, and disaster and rescue experts. Three Chinook helicopters were transported to the region, but were returned unused by the Nepali government due to concerns about large helicopters blowing the roofs off houses.

An appeal by the Disasters Emergency Committee, an umbrella group for 13 UK charities, raised £50 million ($79 million) in donations from the UK public.

Engineers from the British Army's Brigade of Gurkhas began deploying to the region on 27 April 2015 to join others based at the brigade's HQ in Kathmandu, as well as with other Gurkha soldiers who were on Everest at the time of the earthquake. They provided translation support for other search and rescue teams.

=== United States ===
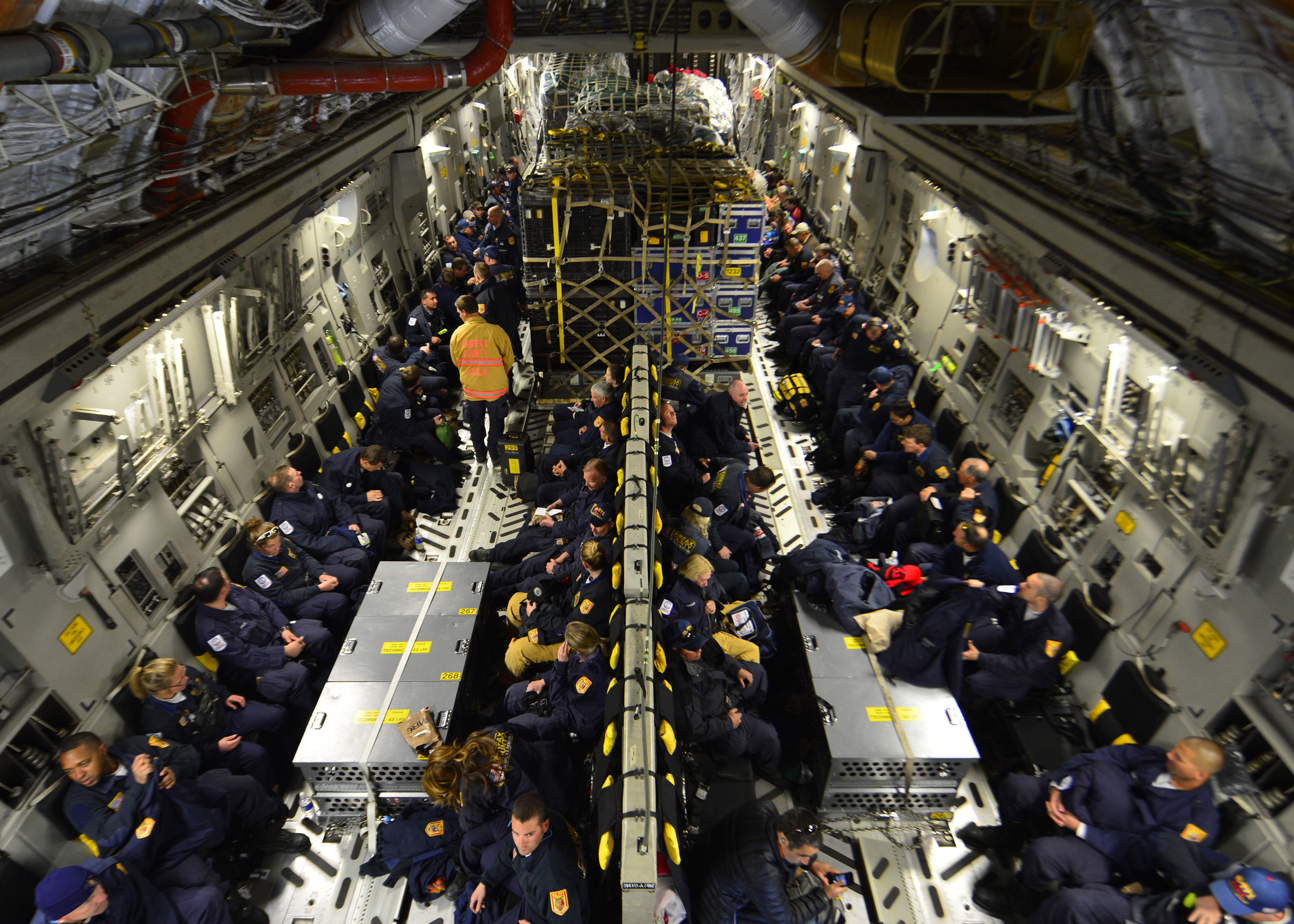
Members of the Fairfax County Urban Search and Rescue Team await takeoff on a U.S. Air Force C-17 Globemaster III at Dover Air Force Base.

The White House and Secretary of State John Kerry offered condolences and pledged to offer assistance. On the day of the quake, the U.S. sent aid and sent $1 million and a disaster response team to assist with immediate needs. Kerry stated that the United States Agency for International Development (USAID) was activating an urban search and rescue team. On 26 April, Urban Search and Rescue Virginia Task Force 1 from Fairfax County, Virginia, was deployed to Nepal from the Dover Air Force Base. Los Angeles County's Urban Search and Rescue California Task Force 2 was scheduled to arrive in Nepal on 28 April. On 26 April, the Pentagon announced that U.S. Army Green Beret soldiers, who were in Nepal undergoing high-altitude training with the Nepalese army at the time of the quake, remained in the country to assist with rescue efforts. Joint Task Force 505 deactivated after deployment to humanitarian Operation Sahayogi Haat on 26 May 2015. The U.S. also sent $10 million in aid to Nepal.

=== Vatican City ===
Pope Francis offered prayers for victims, and sent US$100,000 as a first installment to aid the relief efforts.

=== Venezuela ===
The government expressed its "deep sorrow" to victims in the powerful earthquake in Nepal and offered its expertise in rescue operations.

=== Vietnam ===
The government provided around US$50,000 and the Vietnam Red Cross provided another US$30,000, along with the deployment of ten rescuers. However, the Vietnam Red Cross members returned to their home country on 28 April, saying the Nepal Red Cross did not let them stay, as they were not equipped with the native language or skills to understand the local situation.

== Needs ==
Finance Minister Ram Sharan Mahat criticised humanitarian efforts, saying "We have received things like tuna fish and mayonnaise. What good are those things for us?" There were reports of needing food, tarps, tents, and water.

== Government organisations ==
- European Union – Commissioner Christos Stylianides said the EU was closely following the situation and expressed solidarity. On 26 April, the European Commission announced that it was providing €3 million and mobilising response teams in its immediate response to the Nepal earthquake. The commission's emergency aid went towards the most urgent needs in the worst affected areas, including clean water, medicine, emergency shelter and telecommunications. Along with this, the EU Civil Protection Mechanism was activated. Through it, Member States, including Belgium, Finland, Germany, Greece, Italy, Netherlands, Poland, and Sweden immediately offered urgently needed search and rescue teams, water purification systems, and technical assistance.
- The Indian Space Research Organisation activated the International Charter on Space and Major Disasters on behalf of UNICEF, which provided satellite coverage of the affected region.
- Tibet – Central Tibetan Administration prime minister-in-exile Lobsang Sangay said: "At this dark and painful time, words fail to convey how deeply we feel for the people affected in Nepal, Tibet and India."
- United Nations – UN Secretary-General Ban Ki-moon asserted that the UN was preparing for a big relief effort. President of the Sixty-ninth session of the United Nations General Assembly, Sam Kutesa, expressed his deep concern and sorrow over the devastation. The executive director of the UN Population Fund (UNPF), Babatunde Osotimehin, said he was "shocked and saddened", and that the UNPF was ready to join efforts to assist Nepal. On 27 April, the UN donated US$15 million in funds to better facilitate the efforts of international humanitarian organizations. Food trucks were being sent "to affected districts outside the Kathmandu valley" with distribution scheduled to begin on 28 April.
  - World Food Programme (WFP) – Late on 26 April, the WFP announced that a charter flight from its Dubai depot would carry food and aid supplies to Nepal on 28 April.
  - World Health Organization (WHO) – On 26 April, the WHO sent four inter-agency emergency health kits to hospitals in Nepal; each kit contained medical supplies sufficient to meet the health needs of 10,000 people for three months. The WHO also released US$175,000 from the South-East Asia Regional Health Emergency Fund to Nepal's Ministry of Health and Population as an initial tranche of emergency health funding to address the immediate needs of victims.
- The USAID announced on 26 April that it would "contribut[e] $10 million in assistance for … immediate, life-saving priorities" in Nepal.

== Relief organisations ==
- The American Jewish Joint Distribution Committee – The New York-based NGO provided medical assistance through aid workers traveling from India to Nepal.
- CARE provided ground support during the earthquake, and assisted people by supplying ready-to-eat meals, clean drinking water, and latrine construction. It also created an online relief fund for the earthquake support. On 26 April, the European Commission announced that they mobilised in its immediate response to the Nepal earthquake. The commission's emergency aid went towards the most urgent needs in the worst affected areas, including clean water, medicine, emergency shelter, and telecommunications.
- Catholic Relief Services and its partner organisations procured emergency relief materials, like shelter kits and sanitation and hygiene materials.
- The Chabad House in Kathmandu provided shelter, food, and medical treatment for hundreds of Israeli tourists in the aftermath of the earthquake. Volunteers distributed hot food to hundreds of Nepalese citizens. Chabad also launched the Nepal Jewish Relief Fund to provide humanitarian aid to those affected by the disaster.
- ChildFund Japan donated 10 tons of rice and 1.5 tons of dal and salt to support more than 10,000 children and family members.
- The Christian Children's Fund of Canada donated $350,000 in humanitarian assistance funding from the Department of Foreign Affairs, Trade and Development Canada (DFATD) to establish and run child-friendly spaces and temporary learning spaces for children affected by the earthquake.
- Médecins Sans Frontières sent eight teams of health care providers, including eight surgeons, to assist earthquake victims and distribute supplies. The group said four of the teams crossed the border from Bihar, a team from New Delhi went to Kathmandu, and a team from Japan went to the Kathmandu Valley. A surgical team of eight staff left Brussels, set up a surgery unit, and ran mobile clinics. A team from Amsterdam left on 27 April with medical, water and sanitation relief. The organisation sent an inflatable hospital which has a 60–80 bed capacity, and consists of two wards plus a surgical recovery room.
- Embracing the World sent 50 tonnes of wheat, 2,000 sets of warm clothes and various medicines to Kathmandu as immediate aid for survivors of the devastating earthquake in Nepal. A senior representative was sent to study the situation on the ground and begin the process of establishing a tie-up with the UN relief team working in Nepal to support aid efforts in the coming days.
- Gift of the Givers prepared a 40-person team with specialised equipment to send to Nepal and organised a charter flight to South Africa to evacuate South African citizens. The assistance was estimated to be worth R5 million.
- GlobalGiving – Money donated to support relief operations in Nepal went toward helping first responders meet survivors' immediate needs for food, fuel, clean water, hygiene products, and shelter, said the organization. "Once initial relief work is complete, this fund will transition to support longer-term recovery efforts run by local, vetted local organizations."
- Habitat for Humanity International – The group said its disaster response teams coordinated efforts with local government agencies and disaster relief partners, and assembled emergency shelter kits.
- Handicap International has been working in Nepal since 2000. They had 47 volunteers on the ground distributing wheelchairs, crutches, and other mobility aids, and provided help with rehabilitation and logistics.
- Humanity First – The charity sent its Medical Disaster Response team consisting of surgeons, medical doctors and A&E paramedics to spend 12 days at the earthquake zone.
- International Federation of Red Cross and Red Crescent Societies (IFRC) — On the day of the earthquake, while preparing to launch an international emergency response, the IFRC donated money from its Disaster Response Emergency Fund and mobilised resources from its regional hubs, including those in Bangkok, Kuala Lumpur, and New Delhi.
- International Medical Corps – The organization's emergency response team was in Nepal providing critically needed medicines and supplies, including hygiene kits and water purification tablets, to survivors. Teams of doctors, nurses and logisticians operated mobile medical units in the hardest-hit areas.
- Jamaat-e-Islami organized a donation camp to help victims.
- The Jewish Federations of North America focused on rebuilding and improving infrastructure after natural and man-made disasters. In Nepal, the groups worked to determine what survivors' immediate needs are, and planned to send emergency supplies.
- Lutheran World Relief – The charity, which normally provides technical help to impoverished farmers, committed an initial US$500,000 to the relief efforts. It said its relief efforts would probably include providing cash transfer programs, water filtration units, quilts and personal hygiene kits.
- MAP International – MAP International, a global Christian health organization, distributed an "interagency emergency health kit" that would treat 10,000 people for 90 days, and supply a container shipment of medicines and supplies.
- Médecins du Monde sent a surgeon from Paris, two other physicians, and some logistical support staff on 26 April.
- Mercy Corps – Mercy Corps has been in Nepal since 2006 and had more than 90 volunteers on the ground trying to distribute water, shelter kits, mosquito netting, tarps, cooking utensils, hygiene materials, and other household provisions.
- Oxfam undertook arrangements to send a team of "technical experts" to the region with sanitation and water purification equipment.
- The Patanjali Yogpeeth yoga institute organised a blood donation camp. The founders (Yogpeeth, Ramdev and Balkrishna) donated blood and asked others to donate. Medicines worth Rs. 1 crore (10,000,000) were donated. Patanjali contributed more than Rs. 5 crore in the relief work. More than 30,000 volunteers organised 30 relief camps in all the affected areas.
- Rashtriya Swayamsevak Sangh (RSS) and the Nepalese branch of Hindu Swayamsevak Sangh sent volunteers to the region to help with rescue efforts in coordination with the Government of Nepal. The next day, it was reported that RSS volunteers from the areas bordering Nepal had been sent in to help with rescue works.
- Samaritan's Purse sent aid to the victims.
- On 25 April, Save the Children, a non-governmental organization, launched a disaster response on the ground in Nepal, with priorities being "to protect vulnerable children and provide desperately needed relief to families".
- Secours populaire français allocated a first emergency fund of €50,000 to assist victims.
- ShelterBox, a disaster relief charity, dispensed pre-positioned aid in country to damaged area hospitals and medical facilities in Kathmandu. Assessment teams and additional aid arrived within 48 hours of the first earthquake. Emergency shelter was provided to more than 15,000 people.
- The Shiromani Gurdwara Parbandhak Committee sent 25,000 food packets every day to Nepal with the help of the Indian Air Force.
- Translators without Borders organised a response team with 25 professional translators and bilingual speakers. It translated documents from aid agencies, including UNOCHA, ICRC, the Communicating with Disaster Affected Communities Network, and others. The team translated terms into Nepali, Newari, and Hindi for search and rescue responders; translated Twitter messages; distributed first aid and public service announcements; transcribed local language news media; and created an English-to-Nepalese text-to-speech tool.
- UNICEF fundraising for Nepal was being provided internationally. On 26 April, UNICEF Canada had raised CAD$180,000.
- The Vishva Hindu Parishad helped to rebuild residential houses, temples, and shrines. The VHP also brought orphaned children to India, and provided for their education and upbringing at its educational institutions spread across the country.
- World Vision released a statement: "We are initiating a response to meet basic, urgent needs with temporary shelter, food, water, emergency health interventions and other vital aid."
- International Medical Corps helped the injured and the needy, and provided the necessary medical assistance and medicines in regions most affected by the earthquake.
- AmeriCares, a US based international Emergency Response and Global Health organization, worked in Nepal since 27 April when its Indian team landed at the Tribhuvan Airport. The organization established medical camps in affected villages and transported medicines and critical supplies to overburdened hospitals. The in-house medical team was supported by medical teams from the New York Medics, a New York-based organization, and Global Hospitals, an India-based organization.

== Online relief initiatives ==
- Facebook introduced a safety check feature where users could either mark themselves or their friends and family as "safe".
- Google launched the Google Person Finder tool to locate missing persons after the earthquake. Google executive Dan Fredinburg was killed after the earthquake triggered an avalanche at Mt. Everest. The company also reduced the call rates through Google Voice into the country for the next week from 19 cents to 1 cent per minute.
- The Humanitarian OpenStreetMap Team was activated by OpenStreetMap to provide remote mapping assistance.
- Wolters Kluwer allowed full, free access for Nepal-based internet addresses to online clinical information resources to support earthquake relief efforts.
- Sparrow SMS launched a toll-free SMS hotline to receive live messages from locals and map the data online to create reports.

== Telecom support ==
- Nepal Telecom provided free call and SMS services within Nepal from 25 April.
- Ncell added credit everyday to SIM cards running out of credit and provided 50 daily free SMS messages as a bonus. Data for Viber calls and Skype was made free for a limited amount of time as with Twitter.
- Indian telecom companies Airtel, Mahanagar Telephone Nigam Limited, and Bharat Sanchar Nigam Limited offered free telephone calls to Nepal up until 28 April.
- On 27 April, Skype offered free calls to landlines and mobiles in and out of Nepal.
- Viber turned off Viber Out billing for Nepali users so that they could call any destination for free. International callers could also call Nepal free of cost via Viber Out.
- T-Mobile added Nepal to its list of Simple Global countries the morning of 27 April. T-Mobile Simple Choice customers with Simple Global had data roaming fees in Nepal waived through 16 May, and data usage was credited since 25 April.
- U.S. mobile phone carriers Sprint and Verizon waived call charges made to Nepal through 10 May.
- AT&T offered free texts and international long-distance calls from the US, Puerto Rico, and the US Virgin Islands to Nepal from 25 April through 16 May.
- All calls placed by Time Warner Cable's Home Phone and Business Services customers to landline and mobile numbers in Nepal were free through 25 May 2015.
- Telus provided free mobile, landline, and text messages to and from Nepal until 10 May.
- Sparrow SMS earthquake helpline 6040 was set up from Nepal Telecom and Ncell to receive help messages from people.
- Vodafone Hutchison Australia responded by providing free calls to Nepal for a week to both prepaid and postpaid services. Telstra and Optus Australia announced free calls for certain time period too.

== Fundraising and donations ==
- Angry Birds Friends hosted the Help Nepal Tournament to raise awareness and help Rovio to raise €100,000 funds.
- Apple Inc. enabled users to make donations through the iTunes Store to the American Red Cross.
- Bijay Acharya from the American Nepal Medical Foundation organised a fundraiser, Nepal Earthquake Relief Fund, on Indiegogo. Over US$100,000 was raised by over 1,500 people within the first day of the campaign.
- Crowdrise — US$750,481 was raised by 60 campaigns for Nepal relief efforts.
- Dalai Lama Trust — The Dalai Lama expressed sadness over the terrible earthquake in Nepal. "The people of Nepal and Tibetans have been neighbours throughout history and many Tibetan refugees live in Nepal," the Dalai Lama said in an open letter to Nepalese Prime Minister Sushil Koirala. "I offer my condolences to you and to those who have lost members of their families, friends and their homes in this tragedy. As a token of solidarity with the people of Nepal, I have asked the Dalai Lama Trust to make a donation towards rescue and relief efforts."
- Facebook matched every dollar donated up to US$2 million. Its funds were distributed to local relief and rescue organizations working to provide immediate and ongoing relief.
- GoFundMe raised US$1,115,617 from 17,805 donors for Nepal relief efforts.
- Google.org committed US$1 million to the response.
- The Foundation Beyond Belief launched a new Humanist Disaster Recovery Drive (HDR) to raise funds for Nepal. As with previous HDR Drives, the "mission is to provide financial support to secular organizations working locally to meet the post-disaster needs of survivors"; 100% of funds raised were donated to beneficiaries.
- Microsoft donated US$1 million to the rescue and recovery efforts in Nepal.
- Nepalese-American fashion designer Prabal Gurung raised thousands of U.S. dollars through the Crowdrise website for relief efforts ranging from "medical aid to food and water supplies...temporary housing to rebuilding the nation and its infrastructure". The project reached 71% of its US$250,000 goal.
- PayPal set up a disaster relief campaign with international aid organizations working directly and through local partners to provide relief. PayPal said it would cover all costs associated with donations it received through the site, and also refund transaction fees to qualified nonprofits participating in the relief and recovery efforts.
- PokerStars and Full Tilt Poker set up a relief fund with CARE International. For every donation they received via the game software, they sent twice the donation amount to CARE International.
- Telus donated CAD$100,000 to relief efforts.
- Uber announced that it was offering a coupon code that would charge INR₹10 extra per ride in 11 cities across India to contribute to the "Prime Minister's National Relief Fund".
- UNICEF established online donation portals dedicated to its Nepal fundraising initiative for residents of Canada, the UK, and the U.S.

== See also ==
- April 2015 Nepal earthquake
- May 2015 Nepal earthquake
- 2015-2016 Nepal humanitarian crisis
- Crowdfunding
- Donation
- Emergency management
- Fundraising
- Humanitarian aid
- Humanitarian principles
- Humanitarianism
- List of development aid agencies
- Operation Sankat Mochan
