= Operation Sahayogi Haat =

2015 earthquake operation in Nepal

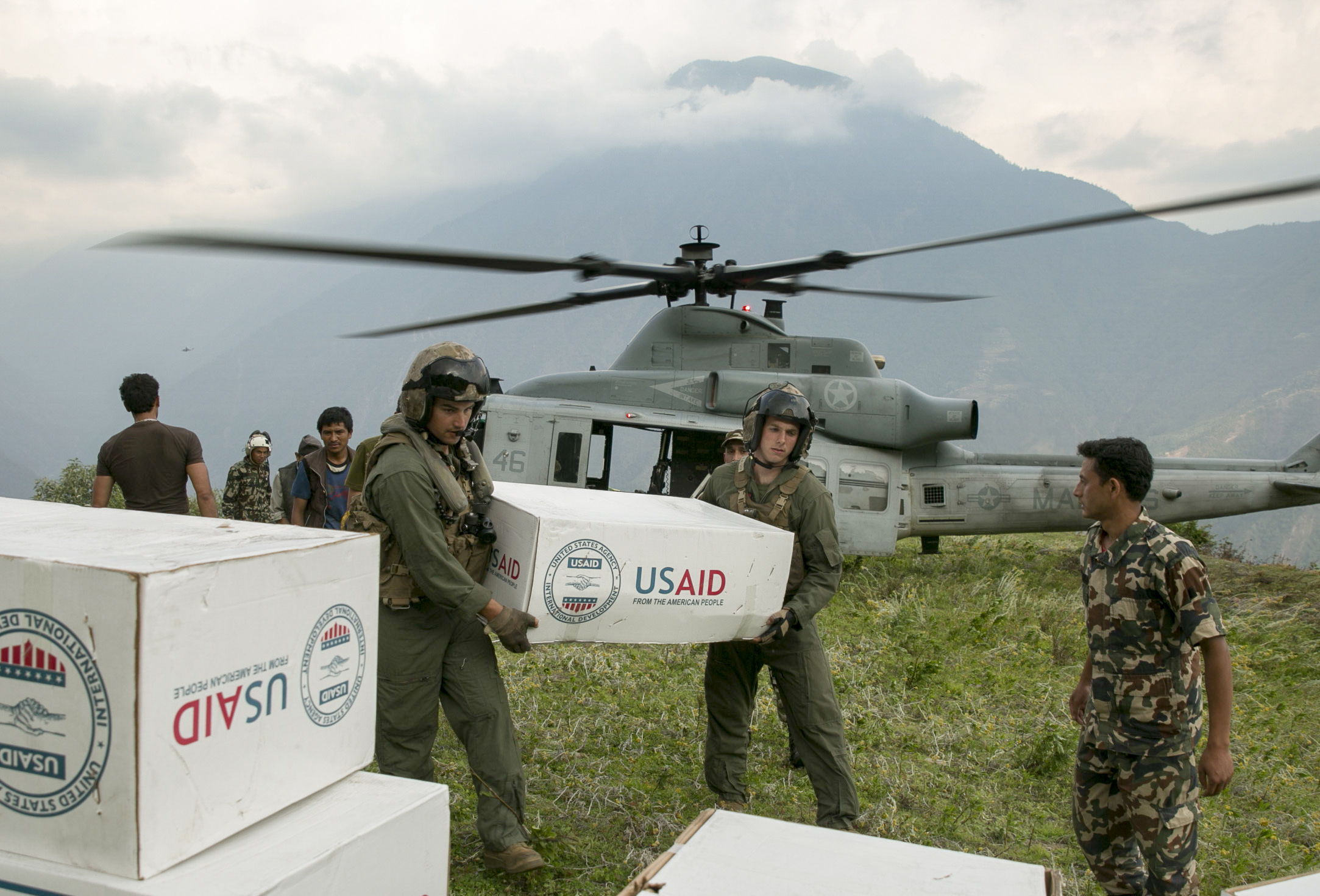
U.S. Marines and Nepalese soldiers unloading tarpaulins for temporary shelter

Operation Sahayogi Haat ("helping hands") was a US military relief operation delivering humanitarian assistance to victims of the April and May 2015 Nepal earthquakes. About 900 US military and civilian personnel were involved, with about 300 deployed in Nepal. 3rd Marine Expeditionary Brigade was tasked to form Joint Task Force 505, which was responsible for managing the relief operation from May 6 to 26, 2015.

== Background ==
A magnitude M_{W} 7.8 earthquake struck the region of Kathmandu in Nepal on April 25, 2015. Operation Sahayogi Haat (Nepali: "helping hands") (Note: "U.S. military earthquake relief efforts in Nepal led by Joint Task Force 505 have been named “Operation Sahayogi Haat,” which means “Helping Hand” in Nepali, by U.S. Pacific Command based out of Camp H.M. Smith, Hawaii.") for humanitarian relief operations was put into action by Joint Task Force 505 on May 6. This task force was put into operation to organize the humanitarian relief efforts to limit further loss of life and suffering. The task force provided the U.S. military response to additionally support Nepal’s government. It joined the efforts that were already going by the Joint Humanitarian Assistance Survey Team and the U.S. Agency for International Development and Office of Foreign Disaster Assistance Response Team. These humanitarian services along with urban search and rescue teams were already delivered to Nepal by the U.S. Air Force. A statement from the U.S. Department of Defense says that their fast response relief efforts in Nepal likely reduced the scale of further disaster following the earthquake.

Another earthquake on May 12 of M_{W} 7.3 struck the same general region of Kathmandu on the same fault as the April earthquake. Humanitarian relief efforts were immediately deployed.

A U.S. Marine Corps Bell UH-1Y "Venom" Huey, BuNo 168792, 'SE-08', of Camp Pendleton-based HMLA-469 "Vengeance" was declared missing on May 12 while supporting the relief operations in the Charikot Region of the Himalaya Mountains. The Nepalese Army discovered the crash site on Friday, May 15. All eight service members aboard perished. The six U.S. Marines are: Capt Dustin R. Lukasiewicz, Capt Christopher L. Norgen, Sgt Ward M. Johnson IV, Sgt Eric M. Seaman, Cpl Sara A. Medina and LCpl Jacob A. Hug. The two Nepalese soldiers are: Tapendra Rawal and Basanta Titara.

On May 15 an "Open Letter" from the People of Nepal remembering the Marines was published. It was thereafter replied to by Peter W. Bodde, Ambassador of the United States of America to Nepal.

== Personnel and supplies ==
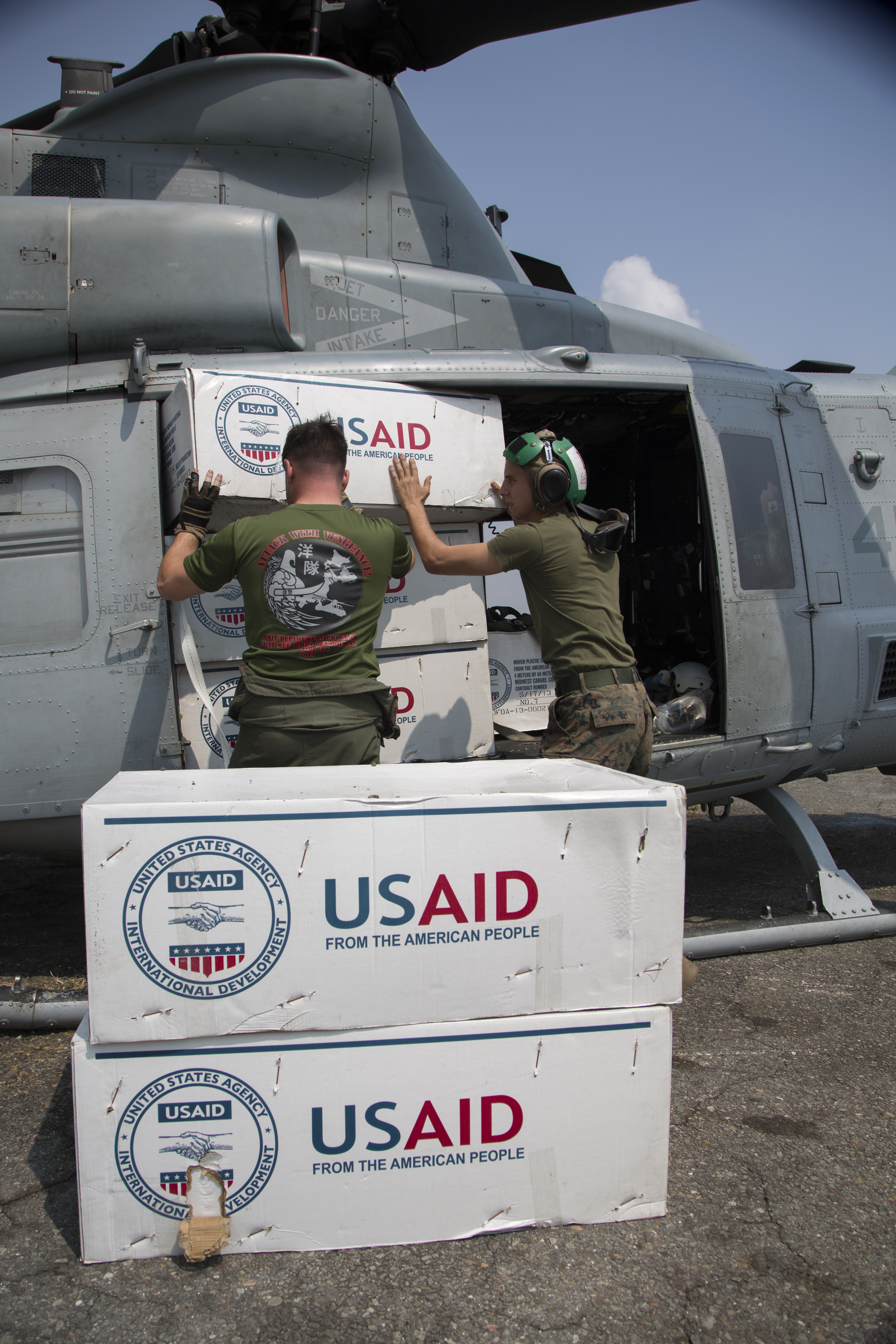
Loading relief supplies

There were a total of about 900 U.S. military personnel from the Army, Navy, Air Force and Marine Corps that contributed to the relief effort under Joint Task Force 505 management. There were about 300 in Nepal, 320 in the main headquarters in Japan, and 280 at the Intermediate Staging Base in Thailand. The U.S. military contributed three Marine Corps UH-1Y Huey helicopters, four Marine Corps MV-22B Osprey tiltrotor aircraft, four Air Force C-17 Globemaster III, four Air Force C-130 Hercules and four Marine Corps KC-130J Hercules aircraft to the relief effort.

Between arrival on May 5 and through May 18, working with the Nepalese army, 42 Airmen (Note: "The 36th CRG, under Joint Task Force 505, is a 42-person team that represents more than 20 Air Force career fields needed to extend air mobility in support of disaster relief missions in nearly any type of environment.") from the 36th Contingency Response Group offloaded more than 4 million pounds (1,800 t) of cargo from 80 aircraft at the Tribhuvan International Airport. According to Capt. Brint Ingersoll, Operations Officer, this "is the most cargo the 36th CRG has downloaded in one disaster relief operation." (Note: In two weeks, they "cut the download time for most aircraft in half, averaging 974 pounds of cargo downloaded every minute." Once downloaded, humanitarian aid was dispatched the same day, "thereby avoiding any congestion at the airfield.")

The American task force acted in concert with over 60 other nations in relief operations. The Royal Thai Navy materially assisted relief efforts. The Nepal Army continued its Operation Sankat Mochan to aid the affected population along with the Indian Army and delivered several tons of relief materials, and rescued stranded people. The China International Search and Rescue Team deployed 68 of its members, as well as six search and rescue dogs, to Nepal via chartered plane in the early morning of April 26, Beijing time.

The task force was deactivated on May 26, 2015. During the operation the United States Marine Corps reported about 120 short tons (110 t) of relief supplies had been deployed. That included shelter kits with blankets, medical supplies, and emergency supplemental food supplies including water. They also reported the transportation of 553 personnel rescues and 69 casualty evacuations that were carried out since the operation began.

== See also ==
- Operation Sankat Mochan, the Nepal Army earthquake relief operation
- Operation Maitri, the Indian Armed Forces earthquake relief operation
- Humanitarian response to the 2015 Nepal earthquake
