= 2015 Charikot helicopter crash =

Aviation accident in Nepal

Coordinates: 27°40′0″N 86°2′0″E

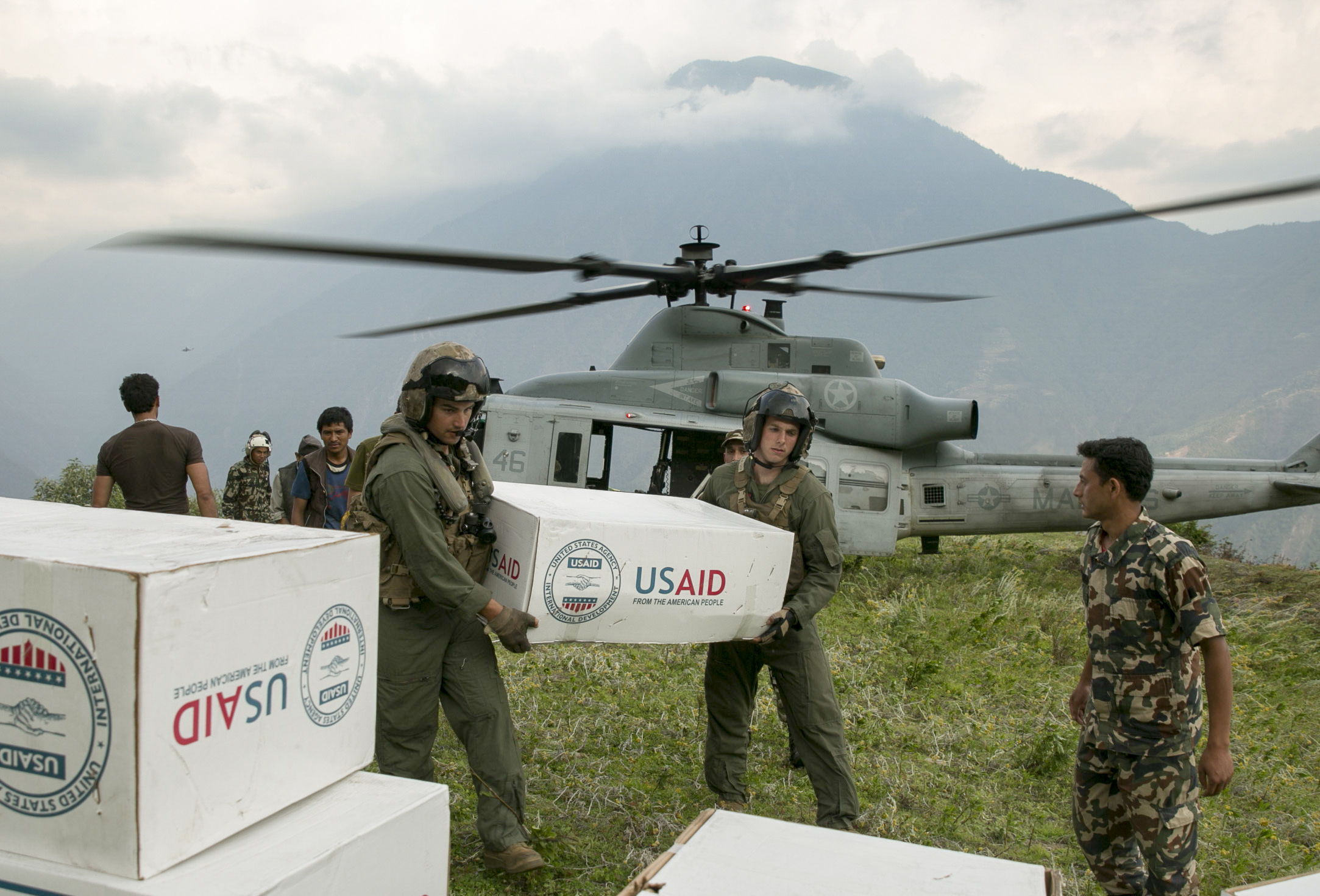
- U.S. Marines and Nepalese Army personnel unloading supplies from a UH-1Y similar to the one involved.

Accident
- Date: 12 May 2015
- Summary: Visual flight into IMC
- Site: Charikot, Nepal

Aircraft
- Aircraft type: Bell UH-1Y Venom
- Operator: United States Marine Corps
- Call sign: Vengeance 01
- Registration: 168792 SE-08
- Flight origin: Dolakha District, Nepal
- Destination: Kathmandu, Nepal
- Occupants: 13
- Passengers: 9
- Crew: 4
- Fatalities: 13
- Survivors: 0

On 12 May 2015, a US Marine Corps Bell UH-1Y Venom of Camp Pendleton-based HMLA-469 squadron crashed in the Charikot region of Nepal during Operation Sahayogi Haat, a humanitarian relief effort following the earthquake that had struck the region earlier. All 13 occupants were killed.

== Accident ==
The following is a statement from PACOM: "On 12 May, at approximately 10 p.m. JST, a UH-1Y Huey with Marine Light Attack Helicopter Squadron 469 in support of Joint Task Force 505 was declared missing while supporting Operation Sahayogi Haat." Nepal's army, struggling with the aftermath of a 7.8-magnitude earthquake that hit on 25 April, had deployed about 400 troops into rocky, forested terrain after the US helicopter was reported missing. A news release from III Marine Expeditionary Force, based in Okinawa, Japan stated that the chosen route, which may have been made because one or more of the injured was in need of urgent treatment, took the UH-1Y Huey helicopter for a brief period over unfamiliar terrain in unstable weather. The helicopter crashed in rugged terrain about 8 miles north of Charikot on a mission to evacuate casualties caused by the April 2015 Nepal earthquake.

== Aircraft ==
The helicopter had arrived in Nepal on May 5. As part of Operation Sahayogi Haat, the U.S. military contributed three Marine Corps UH-1Y Huey helicopters, four Marine Corps MV-22B Osprey tiltrotor aircraft, four Air Force C-17 Globemaster III, four Air Force C-130 Hercules and four Marine Corps KC-130J Hercules aircraft to the relief effort.

== Passengers and crew ==
The flight crew comprised US Marine officers as pilots and several enlisted members, including two Combat Camera Marines. Also aboard were two Nepalese soldiers and five injured civilians in need of urgent treatment.

== Aftermath ==
According to CNN, then Nepali Prime Minister Sushil Koirala said "You know, our terrain is so ... difficult, that is why (it crashed). We feel so sorry for that." In honour of the fallen, the Heritage Room of the U.S. Embassy, in Kathmandu, Nepal was renamed to "Vengeance Hall" after the crashed helicopter.

On May 15 an "Open Letter" from the People of Nepal remembering the Marines was published. It was thereafter replied to by Peter W. Bodde, Ambassador of the United States of America to Nepal.

== Investigation ==
The helicopter crash was attributed to the crew's decision to fly the most direct route to Kathmandu. The chosen course required a brief period over unfamiliar terrain with unstable meteorological conditions and was necessary "due to a real or perceived urgency" concerning the condition of the injured civilians.

It was reported that the aircraft "was enveloped by rapidly developing clouds or lifted into a cloud by rising air currents. As they attempted to maneuver out of the weather conditions, they lost visual reference with the terrain and impacted the ground."
