= Operation Sankat Mochan =

- Part of Response to April 2015 Nepal earthquake
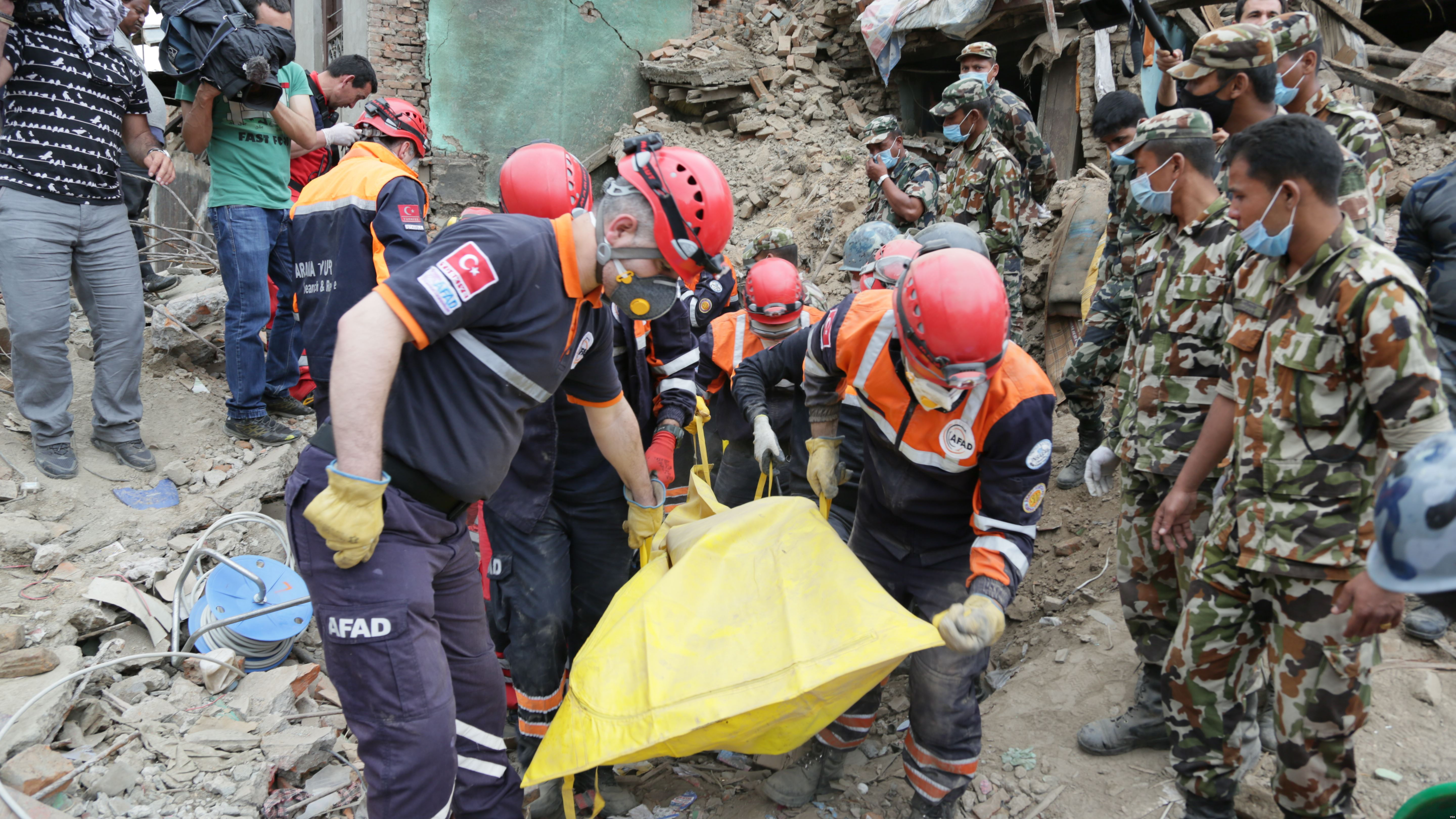
- Nepal Army and Turkish Disaster Relief aid worker working together.
- Type: Emergency response
- Location: Earthquake-affected areas of Central Nepal
- Objective: Search and rescue, disaster relief
- Date: 26 April 2015 –
- Executed by: Nepal Army and Indian Army
- Casualties: 6,311+ confirmed dead; 14,000+ injured

Operation Sankat Mochan (Nepali: संकट मोचन, Operation Crisis Relief) is a Nepal Army earthquake relief operation following the April 2015 Nepal earthquake; the Nepal Army has deployed 90 percent of its force.

== See also ==
- May 2015 Nepal earthquake
- Humanitarian response to the 2015 Nepal earthquake
- Nepalese Army
- Operation Maitri, the Indian Armed Forces earthquake relief operation
- Operation Sahayogi Haat
