= Operation Maitri =

2015 Indian relief operation in Nepal

- Part of 2015 Nepal earthquake
- Operational scope: Humanitarian relief
- Planned by: Indian Armed Forces, National Disaster Response Force and Ministry of Home Affairs
- Objective: Undertaking relief and rescue operations in Nepal, Evacuation of Indian and foreign citizens from Nepal.
- Date: 25 April 2015
- Executed by: Indian Armed Forces, National Disaster Response Force
- Outcome: Successful rescue and relief; over 43,000 Indians were evacuated, over 150 foreign tourist were evacuated and were provided transit visa to as many as 785 foreigners

Operation Maitri (Operation Friendship) was a rescue and relief operation in Nepal carried out by the Government of India and Indian armed forces in the aftermath of the April 2015 Nepal earthquake. The Indian government responded within few minutes of the quake. It started on 26 April 2015 and also involved Nepali ex-servicemen from India's Gurkha Regiments for interface for guidance, relief and rescue.

== Background ==
The April 2015 Nepal earthquake (or the Himalayan earthquake) occurred at 11:56 NST on 25 April with a moment magnitude (M_{w}) of 7.8 and a maximum Mercalli Intensity of IX (Violent). Its epicenter was approximately 34 km (21 mi) east-southeast of Lamjung, Nepal, and its hypocenter was at a depth of approximately 15 km (9.3 mi). It was the most powerful disaster to strike Nepal since the 1934 Nepal–Bihar earthquake. The quake killed nearly 8,900 people in Nepal.

== Mount Everest avalanche ==
The earthquake triggered an avalanche on Mount Everest, killing at least 17. The death toll surpassed that of the 2014 Mount Everest avalanche, making it the most lethal day on the mountain.

An Indian army mountaineering team recovered the bodies of 19 mountaineers from Everest base camp and rescued at least 61 stranded climbers from Mount Everest. Indian Air Force helicopters reached Mount Everest on the morning of 26 April for rescue operations.

== Aircraft used ==
The Indian Army sent Major-General JS Sandhu to Nepal to oversee the rescue and relief efforts. The Indian Air Force mobilized its

- Ilyushin Il-76
- C-130J Hercules (At least two deployed)
- C-17 Globemaster transport aircraft (At least four deployed)
- Advanced Light Helicopters (At least two deployed)
- Mi-17 helicopters for Operation Maitri.

Up to eight Mi-17 helicopters were used for missions such as air-dropping relief materials.

== Response ==
As Nepal's immediate neighbour, India was the first-responder to the crisis, by providing relief "within six to seven hours of the earthquake," Prime Minister Narendra Modi directed immediate dispatch of relief and rescue teams, including medical team, to Nepal. The Indian Foreign Secretary, S. Jaishankar announced that six more National Disaster Response Force teams would be sent to Nepal in the next 48 hours. He also announced that the aircraft sent to Nepal would not just rescue Indians, but citizens of other countries as well.

Air India reduced fares on flights bound for Kathmandu from Delhi, Kolkata, Varanasi, and announced that it would also carry relief material on its flights.

== Timelines ==
- 25 April 2015: By the afternoon, ten teams from India's National Disaster Response Force, totaling 450 personnel and including several search and rescue dogs, had already arrived in Nepal; ten additional Indian Air Force planes soon departed to join them with further aid. In the immediate aftermath of the quake, India sent 43 tons of relief material, including tents and food.
- 26 April 2015: Operation Maitri started. The Indian Air Force evacuated over 500 citizens from Nepal late Saturday through Sunday morning, and hundreds more on Sunday.
  Ten flights were planned for Sunday. These were used to airlift army forward hospitals, teams of doctors, nurses, and paramedics, engineering task forces, water, food, National Disaster Response Force teams, medical personnel and equipment, blankets and tents.
  By Sunday's end, India had dispatched a further 10 tons of blankets, 50 tons of water, 22 tons of food items and 2 tons of medicines to Kathmandu. Nearly 1,000 National Disaster Response Force personnel were also pressed into service, and a "big evacuation" of Indian citizens was conducted through the road route. The government deployed 35 buses to evacuate stranded Indians in Nepal via two routes - Sonauli and Raxaul - along the Indo-Nepal border. India began issuing goodwill visas to foreigners stranded in Nepal and mobilized buses and ambulances to bring them to India by road. Indian Railways provided 100,000 (one lakh) bottles of drinking water to be delivered by the Air Force, with arrangements made to supply 100,000 bottles every day.
- 27 April 2015: By Monday morning, the Indian Air Force had evacuated 1935 Indian citizens from Nepal using 12 aircraft sorties. Indian Army sources stated six of 18 medical teams tasked to help with the relief efforts in Nepal had been deployed. The Indian Army was in the process of sending 10 engineer task forces with machinery to clear roads and debris. The troops took with them a further 10,000 blankets and 1,000 tents were placed on standby. The Indian army also provided oxygen cylinders for distribution to medical teams.
- 28 April 2015: With the weather improving, the Indian Air Force and the Indian Army fanned out to remote areas while continuing to transport essential items from various bases to Kathmandu and evacuating distressed persons to India. A 41-member medical team, along with medical supplies, was sent to Nepal from Rajasthan. The Sashastra Seema Bal dispatched over three dozen vehicles, including ambulances and water tankers to Nepal from its border camps. The Indian government dispatched a further 220 tons of food packets and dry rations, 50 tons of water, 2 tons of medicines, 40 tents and 1,400 blankets to Nepal.

== See also ==
- Operation Sankat Mochan
- Operation Dost
- India–Nepal relations
