= Civic technology =

How government use of telecom and computers interacts with the people

Civic technology, or civic tech, is the idea of using technology to enhance the relationship between people and government through software for communication, decision-making, service delivery, and political processes. It includes information and communications technology supporting government with software built by community-led teams of volunteers, nonprofits, consultants, and private companies as well as embedded tech teams working within government.

== Definition ==
Civic technology broadly encompasses digital tools and platforms designed to strengthen interaction between citizens and government institutions. There are four different types of e-government services, and civic technology falls within the category of government-to-citizen (G2C). The other categories include government-to-business (G2B), government-to-government (G2G), and government-to-employees (G2E). A 2013 report from the Knight Foundation, an American non-profit, attempts to map different focuses within the civic technology space. It broadly categorizes civic technology projects into two categories: open government and community action.

Open government includes:	Community action includes:
Data access and transparency	Peer-to-peer local sharing
Voting	Civic crowdfunding
Visualization and mapping	Neighborhood forums
Data utility	Information crowdsourcing
Resident feedback	Community organizing
Public decision-making	Participatory budgeting

Citizens are also now given access to their representatives through social media. They are able to express their concerns directly to government officials through sites like Twitter and Facebook. There have even been past cases of online voting being a polling option for local elections, which have seen vastly increased turnouts, such as in an Arizona election in 2000 which saw a turnout double that of the previous election. However, some scholars argue that while civic technology can improve government management, it may not always ensure fair democratic representation. Social media is also becoming a growing aspect of government, furthering the communication between the government and its citizenry and towards greater transparency within the governmental sectors. This innovation could facilitate a change towards a more progressive and open government, based on civic engagement and technology for the people. With social media as a communicating platform, it enables the government to provide information to the constituents and citizens on the legislative processes and what is occurring in the Congress, for the sake of the citizens' concerns with the government procedures.

The definition of what constitutes civic technology is contested to a certain extent, especially with regards to companies engaged in the sharing economy, such as Uber, Lyft, and Airbnb. For example, Airbnb's ability to provide New York residents with housing during the aftermath of Superstorm Sandy could be considered a form of civic technology. However, Nathaniel Heller, managing director of the Research for Development Institute's Governance Program, contends that for-profit platforms definitively fall outside of the scope of civic technology: Heller has said that "while citizen-to-citizen sharing is indeed involved, the mission of these companies is focused on maximizing profit for their investors, not any sort of experiment in building social capital." From a goal perspective, civic technology can be understood as "the use of technology for the public good".

Microsoft's Technology & Civic Engagement Team have attempted to produce a precise taxonomy of civic technology through a bottom-up approach. They inventoried the existing initiatives and classified them according to:

- their functions
- the social processes they involved
- their users and customers
- the degree of change they sought
- the depth of the technology.

Technology that is designed to benefit the citizenry places the governments under pressure "to change and innovate the way in which their bureaucracies relate to citizens". E-government initiatives have been established and supported in order to strengthen the democratic values of governmental institutions, which can include transparency in government, along with improving the efficiency of the legislative processes to make the government more accountable and reactive to citizens' concerns. These will further civic engagement within the political spectrum for the sake of greater direct representation and a more democratic political system.

Civic hacking refers to problem-solving by programmers, designers, data scientists, communicators, organizers, entrepreneurs, and government employees. A civic hacker may work autonomously and independently from the government but may still coordinate or collaborate with them. For example, in 2008, civic hacker William Entriken created an open-source web application that publicly displayed a comparison of the actual arrival times of Philadelphia's local SEPTA trains to their scheduled times. It also automatically sends messages to SEPTA to recommend updates to the train schedule. SEPTA's response indicated interest in coordinating with this civic hacker directly to improve the application. Some projects are led by nonprofits, such as Code for America and mySociety, often involving paid staff and contributions from volunteers.

As the field of civic technology advances, apps and handheld devices may become a key focus for development as more companies and municipalities reach out to developers to help with specific issues. Apps are being used in conjunction with handheld devices to simplify tasks such as communication, data tracking, and safety. The most cost-effective way for citizens to get help and information is through neighbors and others; by linking people through apps and websites that foster conversation and promote civil service, cities have found an inexpensive way to provide services to their residents.

Civic technology represents "just a piece of the $25.5 billion that government spends on external information technology (IT)," indicating that this sector will likely grow, fostering more innovation in both public and private sectors and furthering civic engagement within these platforms.

=== Worldwide ===
A worldwide organization that supports civic tech is the Open Government Partnership (OGP). It "is a multilateral initiative that aims to secure concrete commitments from governments to promote transparency, empower citizens, fight corruption, and harness new technologies to strengthen governance". Created in 2011 by eight founding governments (Brazil, Indonesia, Mexico, Norway, the Philippines, South Africa, the United Kingdom and the United States), the OGP gathers every year for a summit. Countries involved are located mainly in America (North and South), Europe and South-Asia (Indonesia, Australia, South Korea). Only a few African countries are part of the OGP, though South Africa is one of the founding countries.

Technological progress is rampant throughout the nations of the world, but there are dividing efforts and adoption techniques in how rapid certain countries are progressing compared to others. How countries are able to use information pertains to how devoted nations are to integrating technology into the lives of their citizens and businesses. Local and national governments are funding tens of billions of dollars towards information technology, for the sake of improving the functions and operations of this technology to work for the people and the governments. With more governments attaining a grasp on these technologies, it is paving the way towards more progressive and democratic political systems, for the concerns of future society and for those of the citizens of these nations.

== Africa ==
=== Burkina Faso ===
==== Government-led initiatives ====
The government of Burkina Faso has a government website portal offering citizens online information about the government structure, their constitution, and laws.

=== Kenya ===
==== Citizen-led initiatives ====
Launched in Kenya in 2014, "MajiVoice" is a joint initiative by the Water Services Regulatory Board (WASREB- the Water Sector Regulator in Kenya) and the World Bank's Water and Sanitation Program. As opposed to walk-in complaint centers, the initiative enables Kenyan citizens to report complaints with regards to water services via multiple channels of technology. The platform allows for communication between citizens and water service providers with the intention to improve service delivery in impoverished areas and user satisfaction. Users are given four options to report their water complaints. They can dial a number and report a complaint, send a text message (SMS) through their cell phone, or login to an online portal through a web browser on their phone or their laptop. One evaluation highlights the citizen engagement achieved after its implementation, from 400 complaints a month to 4000 complaints, and resolution rates from 46 percent to 94 percent.

=== South Africa ===
==== Government-led initiatives ====
The South African government has a website portal for citizens called www.gov.za — this was created by Center for Public Service Innovation (CPSI) in partnership with the Department of Public Service and Administration and the State Information Technology Agency. The government portal allows the citizens to interact with their government and provide feedback, request forms online, as well as access online to laws and contact information for lawmakers. GovChat is the official citizen engagement platform for the South African Government — accessible via WhatsApp, Facebook Messenger, SMS and USSD, it offers information to citizens about a wide-array of services provided by the Government.

==== Citizen-led initiatives ====
Grassroot is a technology platform that supports community organizers to mobilize citizens, built for low-bandwidth, low-data settings that allows for smart-messaging through text message. Research by the MIT Governance Lab suggests that Grassroot can have important effects on the leadership capacity of community leaders, an effect that is most likely to be achieved through careful design, behavioral incentives, active coaching and iteration.

=== Uganda ===
==== Government-led initiatives ====
The Ugandan government has a website portal created for citizens called Parliament Portal, which gives citizens online access to laws, their constitution, and election related news.

==== Citizen-led initiatives ====
U-Report, a mobile platform introduced by UNICEF Uganda in 2011, is an initiative that runs large scale polls with Ugandan youth on a wide range of issues, ranging from safety to access to education to inflation to early marriage. The goal of the initiative was to have Ugandan youth play a role in civic engagement within the context of local issues. U-Report is still active (as of April 2018), with over 240,000 users across Uganda. Support for the initiative primarily came from the aid of the government, NGO's, youth organizations, faith based organizations, and private companies. Users sign up for the program for free by sending a text on their phone, then every week "U-Reporters" answer a question regarding a public issue. Poll results are published in public media outlets such as newspapers, radio, etc. UNICEF takes these responses and provides members of parliament (MP's) a weekly review of these results, acting as a bridge between government and Ugandan youth.

== Asia ==
=== Taiwan ===
Taiwan is highly ranked internationally for its technological innovations including open data, digital inclusivity, and widespread internet participation.

As of 2019, approximately 87% of Taiwan's citizens over 12 years old had connectivity to the internet. The widespread use of internet has facilitated online political participation by giving citizens a platform to express their political opinions. Through the internet, Taiwanese citizens can directly contact political figures through online channels and publicly voice their political beliefs. New innovations have continued to be made in Taiwan that foster more political participation. The online platform called "Join," for example, was created in 2015 to give Taiwanese citizens a way to discuss, review, and propose governmental policy. Overall, the development of the internet and the emergence of new technologies in Taiwan has shown to increase political participation among its citizens.

==== Government-led initiatives ====
Taiwan's Digital Minister Audrey Tang has made strides to increase communication and collaboration between the government and the general public. Networks of Participation Officers have been established in each minister to jointly create new governmental policies between the public sector, citizens. and other government departments through collaborative meetings. Taiwan has taken on a collaborative approach to civic technology as a way to encourage increased participation from the public. New governmental policies in Taiwan have helped foster technological advancement, such as the Financial Technology Development and Innovative Experimentation Act which passed in 2017 that created a Regulatory Sandbox platform to support the development of FinTech in Taiwan. This sandbox was created to support industry creativity by enabling entrepreneurs and companies to experiment freely with new technologies without legal constraints for a year.

==== Citizen-led initiatives ====
The g0v movement was created in 2012 with the goal of engaging more citizens in public affairs. It is a grassroots and decentralized civic tech community composed of coders, designers, NGO workers, civil servants and citizens designed to increase transparency of government information. All of g0v's projects are open-source and created by citizens. The g0v community has participated in a variety of social movements, including the Sunflower Student Movement where it provided a crowdsourcing platform, and the Hong Kong Umbrella Movement where it provided live broadcasting and a logistics system. The vTaiwan (v for virtual) was created initially by members of g0v and later as a collaboration with the Taiwan's government. vTaiwan is a digital space where participants can discuss controversial topics. It uses a conversation tool called pol.is that leverages machine learning to scale online discussion.

Civic technology in Taiwan was a key component of the country's successful response to the COVID-19 epidemic. Partnering with the Taiwanese government, the civic tech community used open data to create maps available to citizens that visualized the availability of masks to make the distribution of PPE more efficient. Big data analytics and QR code scanning also were used in Taiwan's response to the pandemic, which enabled the government to send out real-time alerts during clinical visits and track citizens' travel history and health symptoms. The response to the COVID-19 pandemic in Taiwan is representative of the country's shift towards a 'techno-democratic statecraft' and positioned them as a new leader in the international sphere for digital infrastructure. Taiwan's handling and early response to the epidemic has gained them international praise, with the country having significantly fewer COVID-19 cases than their neighbors.

=== Japan ===
In Japan, the Civic Tech movement has been rapidly growing since around 2013. Japan's civic tech initiatives have been primarily citizen-led, but more recently, Japan has taken on government-led initiatives as well.

==== Citizen-led initiatives ====
The purpose of civic tech initiatives are to educate the population to use technology as a democratization tool and to access public information.

Although the rapid growth of the civic tech movement in Japan started around 2013, the movement first came about in 2011 after the earthquake, tsunami and nuclear meltdowns that occurred in the Tōhoku region. After the Fukushima disaster, citizen-led initiative Safecast, which allows citizens to collect and distribute radiation data, was created.

The mission of citizen-led initiative Code for All is to make data more accessible to the public and to encourage the use of technology for the democratization of governance. The Code for Japan chapter is one of several chapters started by Code for All. Although Code for Japan is a citizen-led initiative, it also works closely with the government. Policy Advisor of the Japanese Ministry of Internal Affairs, Naoki Ota, who is a promoter of Code for Japan's civic tech projects. In light of the COVID-19 pandemic, Code for Japan also developed stopcovid19.metro.tokyo.lg.jp for the Tokyo Metropolitan Government that informs the public about the number of coronavirus cases and reductions in metropolitan subway usage.

A different citizen-led project led by JP-MIRAI released an app that allows migrant workers to file complaints and address issues regarding items like visas and taxation. The app currently called JP-MIRAI Portal was launched in March 2022. JP-MIRAI Portal is designed provide migrant workers the ability to have their voice be heard, while also providing counseling with their other service JP-MIRAI Assist. This app is still being updated with more features planned in the future .

==== Government-led initiatives ====
While civic technology initiatives in Japan had mostly been citizen-led, the inception of the coronavirus pandemic encouraged the Japanese government to transition to digitization.

This is because former in-person practices moved to the digital space in lieu of the coronavirus. The government plans to focus on the digitization aspect of its functions: the implementation of more sophisticated systems in the central and local governments in order to increase the security of private and personal information and the transference from the primary use of Hanko –– a seal used in lieu of a signature on printed documents –– to digital verifications and documents in order to increase efficiency.

The Tokyo Metropolitan Government has also made strides in light of the pandemic. Through the use of a copyright that allows for malleable content distribution Creative Commons licensing, and open-source development platform GitHub, the Tokyo Metropolitan Government has allowed other collaborators to add to the data and code of the project created by Code for Japan.

=== Pakistan ===
Pakistan's civic tech landscape is evolving rapidly, driven by both citizen-led and government-led initiatives. Civic technology in Pakistan is being used to address various socio-economic challenges, enhance governance, and improve public service delivery. The country is experiencing a growing trend of tech-driven solutions aimed at fostering transparency, accountability, and citizen engagement. Key areas of focus include open data initiatives, digital platforms for citizen services, and tools for civic participation.

==== Citizen-led initiatives ====
- Code for Pakistan (CfP), founded in 2013, is a civic technology non-profit organization focused on bridging the gap between government and citizens via harnessing technology for civic and social good. CfP is an executive committee member of Code for All. CfP collaborates with government bodies to develop digital solutions to civic-facing problems, and it provides ways for people in Pakistan to be more civically engages. Notable projects include Civic Innovation Fellowship Programs with the governments of Khyber Pakhtunkhwa and Gilgit-Baltistan to create human-centered technology solutions for public services — and various open data initiatives that promote transparency and public participation. This includes creating the Khyber Pakhtunkhwa Open Data Portal in partnership with the Khyber Pakhtunkhwa government, and publishing Pakistan's first Open Data Playbook. CfP regularly organizes civic hackathons to address civic issues within Pakistan with the help of community members.
- Shehri Pakistan is dedicated to promoting urban planning and civic awareness around environmental issues. It runs projects that focuses on environmental and heritage conservation through public engagement and advocacy.

==== Government-led initiatives ====
- The Pakistan Citizen's Portal (PCP) is a mobile application launched by the Government of Pakistan to facilitate citizen feedback and resolve public grievances. It features a grievance redressal system that allows citizens to lodge complaints regarding various government services and a performance monitoring system to track and monitor the performance of government officials in addressing complaints. Code for Pakistan assisted the government in the development of this application.
- The Punjab Information Technology Board (PITB) is an autonomous body set up by the Government of Punjab to promote IT in governance. Its key projects include e-Rozgaar, which provides digital skills training to youth for freelance work, and the School Information System, which digitizes school records and improves education management.
- The Khyber Pakhtunkhwa Information Technology Board (KPITB) is dedicated to the development of the IT sector in Khyber Pakhtunkhwa. Its major projects include Durshal, a network of co-working spaces and innovation labs across KP to support tech entrepreneurs, and Citizen Facilitation Centers, which provide one-stop digital services to citizens.

Pakistan's civic tech ecosystem is characterized by a collaborative approach between citizens, tech communities, and government bodies. The ongoing efforts in this sector aim to empower citizens, improve governance, and address critical societal issues through innovative technological solutions.

=== Nepal ===
Civic technology in Nepal is growing, and has been utilized for tasks like mapping, migrant work technology, digital literacy and open data understanding in Nepal thus far.

==== Citizen-led initiatives ====
- Kathmandu Living Labs (KLL), founded in 2013, is a civic technology company based in Nepal that works actively to train residents in Nepal and other Asian countries in mapping their communities via OpenStreetMap (OSM). During the 2015 earthquake in Nepal (magnitude of 7.3), organizations responsible for aid relief and reconstruction used OSM to navigate the disaster.
- In 2016, a new migration tool called Shuvayatra (Safe Journey) was launched in Nepal for the migrant workers of Nepal. The Asia Foundation worked with the Non-Residential Nepali Association (NRNA) and software firm, Young Innovations, in order to develop this mobile app that provides Nepali migrant workers with financial, education and training resources, as well as reliable employment services. The technology was developed in response to the often exploitative promises of working abroad as a migrant worker.
- In its beginnings, Code for Nepal, a non-profit organization that began in the United States, provided workshops in digital literacy for women in Kathmandu. Since, the organization has evolved to launching open data and civic tech products, as well as organizing conferences and scholarships for young men and women.
- Another civic tech non-profit called Open Knowledge Nepal has also been working to make data open and accessible to Nepali residents.

== Oceania ==
=== Australia ===
==== Citizen-led initiatives ====
In Australia, a platform and proposed political party called MiVote has a mobile app for citizens to learn about policy and cast their vote for the policies they support. MiVote politicians elected to office would then vote in support of the majority position of the people using the app.

Snap Send Solve is a mobile app for citizens to report to local councils and other authorities quickly and easily. In 2020, 430,000 reports where sent via the app. A January 2021 report in Melbourne's Herald Sun noted an increased number of reports for dumped rubbish.

== Europe ==
=== Denmark ===
==== Government-led initiatives ====
In 2002, MindLab an innovation public sector service design group was established by the Danish ministries of Business and Growth, Employment, and Children and Education. MindLab was one of the world's first public sector design innovation labs and their work inspired the proliferation of similar labs and user-centered design methodologies deployed in many countries worldwide. The design methods used at MindLab are typically an iterative approach of rapid prototyping and testing to evolve not just their government projects, but also government organizational structure using ethnographic-inspired user research, creative ideation processes, and visualization and modeling of service prototypes. In Denmark, design within the public sector has been applied to a variety of projects including rethinking Copenhagen's waste management, improving social interactions between convicts and guards in Danish prisons, transforming services in Odense for mentally disabled adults and more.

=== Estonia ===
==== Government-led initiatives ====
The process of digitalization in Estonia began in 2002, when local and central governments began building an infrastructure that allowed autonomous and interconnected data. That same year in 2002, Estonia launched a national ID system that was fully digitalized and paired with digital signatures. The national ID system allowed Estonians to pay taxes online, vote online, do online banking, access their health care records, as well as process 99% of Estonian public services online 24 hours a day, seven days. Estonia is well known internationally for its e-voting system. Internet voting (where citizens vote remotely with their own equipment) was piloted in Estonia in 2005 and has been in use since then. As of 2016, Estonia's Internet voting system has been implemented in three local elections, two European Parliament elections, and three parliamentary elections.

In 2007, Estonia faced a politically motivated, large cyber attack which damaged most of the country's digital infrastructure, and as a result became the home of NATO Cyber Defense Centre of Excellence. The National Security Response was updated and approved in 2010 in response to the cyber attacks, and recognizes the growing threat of cyber crime in Estonia.

In 2014, Estonia launched the e-Residency, which allowed users to create and manage a location independent business online from anywhere in the world. That was followed by an immigration visa for digital nomads, which was a novel way of approaching immigration policy.

Citizen-led initiatives

Several citizen designed e-democracy platforms have launched in Estonia. In 2013, the online platform People's Assembly (Rahvakogu) was launched for crowdsourcing ideas and proposals to amend Estonia's electoral laws, political party law, and other issues related to democracy. Citizen OS is another e-democracy platform and is free and open source. The platform was created with the goal of enabling Estonian citizens to engage in collaborative decision-making, encouraging users to initiate petitions and participate in meaningful discussion on issues in society.

=== France ===
The most dynamic French city regarding civic tech is Paris, with many initiatives moving in the Sentier, a neighborhood known for being a tech hub. According to Le Monde, French civic tech is "already a reality" but lacks investments to scale up.

==== Government-led initiatives ====
In France, public data are available on data.gouv.fr by the Etalab mission, located under the authority of the Prime Minister.

Government agencies are also leading large citizen consultation through the Conseil national du numérique (National digital council), for example with the law about the digital republic (Projet de loi pour une république numérique).

==== Citizen-led initiatives ====
The French citizen community for civic tech is gathered in the collective Démocratie ouverte (Open democracy). The main purpose of this collective is to enhance democracy to increase citizen power, improve the way to decide collectively and update the political system. Démocratie ouverte gathers many projects focused on understanding politics, renewing institutions, participating in democracy, and public action. Several open-source, non-profit web platforms have been launched nationwide to support citizen's direct involvement: Communecter.org, Demodyne.org as well as Democracy OS France (derived from the Argentinian initiative).

LaPrimaire.org organizes open primaries to allow the French to choose the candidates they wish to run for public elections

=== Iceland ===
The Icelandic constitutional reform, 2010–13 instituted a process for reviewing and redrafting their constitution after the 2008 financial crisis, using social media to gather feedback on twelve successive drafts.

Beginning in October 2011, a Citizens Foundation platform called Betri Reykjavik had been implemented for citizens to inform each other and vote on issues. Each month the city council formally evaluates the top proposals before issuing an official response to each participant. As of 2017, the number of proposals approved by the city council reached 769.

The Pirate Party (Iceland) uses the crowdsourcing platform Píratar for members to create party policies.

=== Italy ===
==== Citizen-led initiatives ====
A consortium made by TOP-IX, FBK and RENA created the Italian civic tech school. The first edition was in May 2016 in Turin.

The Five Star Movement, an Italian political party has a tool called Rousseau which gives members a way to communicate with their representatives.

=== Spain ===
The Madrid City Council has a department of Citizen Participation that facilitates a platform called Decide Madrid for registered users to discuss topics with others in the city, propose actions for the City Council, and submit ideas for how to spend a portion of the budget on projects voted on through participatory budgeting.

Podemos (Spanish political party) uses a reddit called Plaza Podemos where anybody can propose and vote on ideas.

=== Sweden ===
The City of Stockholm has a make-a-suggestion page on stockholm.se and available as an app, allowing citizens to report any ideas for improvement in the city along with a photo and GPS. After receiving a suggestion, it is sent to the appropriate office that can place a work order. During 2016, one hundred thousand requests were recorded. This e-service began in September 2013.

The city government of Gothenburg has an online participatory voting system, open for every citizen to propose changes and solutions. When a proposal receives more than 200 votes, it is delivered to the relevant political committee.

=== United Kingdom ===
==== Government-led initiatives ====
In 2007 and 2008 documents from the British government explore the concept of "user-driven public services" and scenarios of highly personalized public services. The documents proposed a new view on the role of service providers and users in the development of new and highly customized public services, utilizing user involvement. This view has been explored through an initiative in the UK. Under the influence of the European Union, the possibilities of service design for the public sector are being researched, picked up, and promoted in countries such as Belgium.

Care Opinion was set up to strengthen the voice of patients in the NHS in 2005. Behavioural Insights Team (BIT) (also known as Nudge) was originally part of the British cabinet and was founded in 2010, in order to apply nudge theory to try to improve British government policy, services and save money. As of 2014, BIT became a decentralized, semi-privatized company with Nesta (charity), BIT employees and the British government each owning a third of this new business. That same year a Nudge unit was added to the United States government under president Obama, referred to as the 'US Nudge Unit,' working within the White House Office of Science and Technology Policy.

==== Citizen-led initiatives ====
FixMyStreet.com is a website and app developed by mySociety, a UK based civic technology company that works to make online democracy tools for British citizens. FixMyStreet allows citizens in the United Kingdom to report public infrastructure issues (such as potholes, broken streetlights, etc.) to the proper local authority. FixMyStreet became inspiration to many countries around the world that followed suit to use civic technology to better public infrastructure. The website was funded by the Department for Constitutional Affairs Innovation fund and created by mySociety. Along with the platform itself, mySociety released FixMyStreet, a free and open-source software framework that allows users to create their own website to report street problems. mySociety has many different tools, like parliamentary monitoring ones, that work in many countries for different types of governance. When such tools are integrated into government systems, citizens can not only understand the inner workings of their now transparent government, but also have the means to "exert influence over the people in power". Newspeak House is a community space and venue focused on building a community of civic and political technology practitioners in the United Kingdom.

Spacehive is a crowdfunding platform for civic improvement projects that allows citizens and local groups to propose project ideas such as improving a local park or starting a street market. Projects are then funding by a mix of citizens, companies and government bodies. The platform is used by several councils including the Mayor of London to co-fund projects.

Democracy Club is a community interest company, founded in 2009 to provide British voters with easy access to candidate lists in upcoming elections. Democracy Club uses a network of volunteers to crowdsource information about candidates which is then presented to voters via a postcode search on the website whocanivotefor.co.uk. Democracy Club also works with the Electoral Commission to provide data for a national polling station finder at wheredoivote.co.uk and on the commission's own website.

=== Ukraine ===
==== Government-led initiatives ====
In Ukraine, major civic tech movement started out with open data reform in 2014. As for now, public data are available on data.gov.ua, national open data portal.

==== Citizen-led initiatives ====
Some widely used Ukrainian civic tech projects are donor recruitment platform DonorUA, Ukrainian companies' data and court register monitoring service Open Data Bot, participatory budgeting platform "Громадський проект". The latter accounts for over 3 million users.

In 2017, to foster the growth of civic tech initiatives, Ukrainian NGO SocialBoost launched 1991 Civic Tech Center, a dedicated community space in country's capital, Kyiv. The space opened following a $480,000 grant from Omidyar Network, the philanthropic investment firm established by eBay founder Pierre Omidyar.

== North America ==
=== Canada ===
==== Government-led initiatives ====
Canadian Digital Service (CDS) was launched in 2017, as part of an attempt to bring better IT to the Canadian government. The CDS was established within the Treasury Board of Canada the Canadian agency that oversees spending within departments and the operations of the public service. Scott Brison, the president of the Canadian Treasury Board, launched CDS and was Canada's first minister of Digital Government.

==== Citizen-led initiatives ====
As in other countries, the Canadian civic technology movement is home to several organizations. Code for Canada is a non-profit group, following somewhat the model of Code for America. Several cities or regions host civic technology groups with regular meetings (in order from West to East): Vancouver, Calgary, Edmonton, Waterloo Region, Toronto, Ottawa, Fredericton, Saint John, and Halifax.

=== United States ===
==== Government-led initiatives ====
The Clinton, Bush, and Obama administrations sought initiatives to further openness of the government, through either increased use of technology in political institutions or efficient ways to further civic engagement. The Obama administration pursued an Open Government Initiative based on principles of transparency and civic engagement. This strategy has paved the way for increased governmental transparency within other nations to improve democratically for the citizens' benefit and allow for greater participation within politics from a citizen's perspective. During his run for president, Obama was "tied directly to the extensive use of social media by the campaign".

According to a study conducted by the International Data Corporation (IDC), an estimated $6.4 billion will be spent on civic technology in 2015 out of approximately $25.5 billion that governments in the United States will spend on external-facing technology projects. A Knight Foundation survey of the civic technology field found that the number of civic technology companies grew by roughly 23% annually between 2008 and 2013.

Departments like 18F and the United States Digital Service have also been highlighted by some as examples of government investment in Civic Technology but are more properly government technology. USDS was an Obama era unit modeled after a similar program in Great Britain and while a number of civic technology notables were involved, it differed in important ways from much US Civic Technology effort. 18F was eliminated in 2025, and USDS later merged with the Department of Government Efficiency.

Inspired by an appetite to build government technology with new processes, new digital agencies started the Digital Services Coalition to help build on the momentum.

==== Citizen-led initiatives ====
Civic technology is built by a variety of companies, organizations and volunteer groups. One prominent example is Code for America, a not-for-profit based in San Francisco, working toward addressing the gap between the government and citizens. College students from Harvard University created the national non-profit Coding it Forward that creates data science and technology internships for undergraduate and graduate students in United States federal agencies. Another example of a civic technology organization is the Chi Hack Night, based in Chicago. The Chi Hack Night is a weekly, volunteer-run event for building, sharing and learning about civic technology. Civic Hall is a coworking and event space in New York City for people who want to contribute to civic-minded projects using technology. And OpenGov creates software designed to enable public agencies to make data-driven decisions, improve budgeting and planning, and inform elected officials and citizens.

OneBusAway, a mobile app that displays real-time transit info, exemplifies the open data use of civic technology. It is maintained by volunteers and has the civic utility of helping people navigate their way through cities. It follows the idea that technology can be a tool for which government can act as a society-equalizer.

Princeton University Professor Andrew Appel set out to prove how easy it was to hack into a voting machine. On 3 February 2007, he and a graduate student, Alex Halderman, purchased a voting machine, and Halderman picked the lock in 7 seconds. They removed the 4 ROM chips and replaced them with modified versions of their own: a version of modified firmware that could throw off the machine's results, subtly altering the tally of votes, never to betray a hint to the voter. It took less than 7 minutes to complete the process.

In September 2016, Appel wrote a testimony for the Congress House Subcommittee on Information Technology hearing on "Cybersecurity: Ensuring the Integrity of the Ballot Box", suggesting to for Congress to eliminate touchscreen voting machines after the election of 2016, and that it require all elections be subject to sensible auditing after every election to ensure that the systems are functioning properly and to prove to the American people that their votes are counted as cast.

5 Calls is a civic technology service founded in 2017 that assists users with calling their Congressional representatives. It provides users with scripts that they can use in calls and the phone numbers of their Representatives and Senators, as well as other information.

=== Mexico ===
==== Government-led initiatives ====
Within the Mexican president's office, there is a national digital strategy coordinator who works on Mexico's national digital strategy. The office has created the gob.mx portal, a website designed for Mexican citizen to engage with their government, as well as a system to share open government data. According to McKinsey & Company, in a 2018 survey Mexico had the worst-rated citizen experience (4.4 out of 10) for convenience and accessibility of Mexican government services, of the group of countries surveyed (Canada, France, Germany, Mexico, the United Kingdom, and the United States).

==== Citizen-led initiatives ====
Arena Electoral was an online platform created by Fundación Ethos during the Mexican electoral process of 2012 to promote responsible voting. An online simulation was created by taking the four presidential candidates in that election cycle and each were given policy issues based on the Mexican national agenda that they had to come up with a solution to. Once each candidate gave their solutions, the platform published it on their website and left it to the Mexican citizens to vote for the best policy.

== Latin America ==
=== Argentina ===
Partido de la Red (Net Party) is an Argentinean political party using the DemocracyOS open-source software with the goal of electing representatives who vote according to what citizens decide online. Caminos de la Villa is a citizen action platform where citizens can monitor the urbanization of the City of Buenos Aires. Users are able to view detailed information of the work the government is doing in the neighborhoods. Additionally, users are able to download documents, along with photos of what the government is doing. Users can also make reports of issues with public services to the platform.

=== Bolivia ===
Observatorio de Justicia Fiscal desde las Mujeres (English: The Women's Fiscal Justice Observatory), is an organization that reviews the fiscal policies of the country. They do this by using a system with the same name to process information regarding the spending of the country with a gender focus. This is done to have better equality in the expenditure of the country.

=== Brazil ===
In 2011, NOSSAS, a Brazilian organization that helps citizens and groups express their struggles and make change was founded. They have also made their own tech platform, BONDE. It is a platform in which other organizations can use to make their own website and use tools to spread their reach. Apart from BONDE, NOSSAS also provides support and programs to those who want to become activists.

=== Chile ===
GoVocal is a civic technology company that is in many countries and local governments. Go Vocal works so citizens are better informed in democracy to make public decisions. In 2019, they expanded to Chile and made teams to support them with engagement, budgeting, planning, and more.

=== Colombia ===
Founded in 2016, Movilizatorio was made to encourage and promote citizen participation in democracy. Movilizatorio works on many projects to address various issues in the country including political, social, behavioral, and cultural issues. One of their projects was able to get the local community together because an elementary school had not started classes. Shortly after the movement started, after getting signatures and going to the Secretary of Education, classes started.

=== Panama ===
Fundación para el Desarrollo de la Libertad Ciudadana (English: Foundation for the Development of Citizen Freedom) is an organization founded in 1995. The main goal is to improve democracy in Panama. Ways of achieving this is promoting transparency with the government to prevent corruption and engaging with citizens to increase democratic citizen participation.

=== Paraguay ===
TEDIC is an organization founded in 2012 that defends digital rights of citizens. TEDIC researches information on cybersecurity, copyright, artificial intelligence, and more. They also promote and develop their own software for people to use to make social change. They have worked on topics such as personal data, freedom of expression, gender and digital inclusion, and more.

=== Uruguay ===
A Tu Servicio, a civic tech platform, informs users and citizens on the country's public health services so that they are able to make informed decisions on medical providers. The platform was founded in 2015. It features a list users can use to compare 2 different health care providers. The data includes wait times, prices, number of users, workers, and more. DATA Uruguay is an organization that works on issues surrounding data. They work with other organizations and community to create tools with open data. DATA Uruguay promotes open data and transparency of public information.

=== Venezuela ===
Amidst the COVID-19 pandemic that was happening in Venezuela, programmers have made various apps with civic uses. One of which was Docti.App, it was an app that had a list of locations citizens can go to for emergencies. It had a filterable list to find whatever users needed, including medicine and oxygen bottles. Another example is Javenda, it was a web application used to find nearby hospitals. He gathered data from health centers, added it to a map, and made it accessible for users to locate them.

== Effects ==
=== Effects on social behavior and civic engagement ===
Because of the conveniences provided by civic technology, there are benefits as well as growing concern about the effects it may have on social behavior and civic engagement. New technology allows for connectivity and new communications, as well as changing how we interact with issues and contexts beyond one's intimate sphere. Civic technology affords transparency in government with open-government data, and allows more people of diverse socioeconomic levels to be able to build and engage with civic matters in a way that was not possible prior.

==== Communication ====
The importance of face-to-face interactions has also been called to question with the increase in e-mails and social media and a decrease in traditional, in-person social interaction. Technology as a whole may be responsible for this change in social norm, but it also holds potential for turning it around with audio and video communication capabilities. More research needs to be conducted in order to determine if these are appropriate substitutes for in-person interaction, or if any substitute is even feasible.

Preece & Shneiderman discuss the important social aspect of civic technology with a discussion of the "reader-to-leader framework", which follows that users inform readers, who inform communicators, who then inform collaborators, before finally reaching leaders. This chain of communication allows for the interests of the masses to be communicated to the implementers.

==== Elections ====
Regarding elections and online polling, there is the potential for voters to make less informed decisions because of the ease of voting. Although many more voters will turn out, they may only be doing so because it is easy and may not be consciously making a decision based on their own synthesized opinion. It's suggested that if online voting becomes more common, so should constituent-led discussions regarding the issues or candidates being polled. Voting advice applications helps voters find candidates and parties closest to their preferences, with studies suggesting that the use of these applications tend to increase turnout and affect the choice of voters. An experiment during assembly elections in the Indian state of Uttar Pradesh showed that sending villages voice calls and text messages informing them of criminal charges of candidates increased the vote share of clean candidates and decreased the vote shares of violent criminal candidates.

=== Effects on socioeconomics ===
With advanced technologies coming at higher costs and with an increased reliance on civic technologies may leave low-income families in the dark if they cannot afford the platforms for civic technology, such as computers and tablets. This causes an increase in the gap between lower and middle/high socioeconomic class families.

Knowledge of how to use computers is equally important when considering factors of accessing civic technology applications online, and is also generally lower in low-income households. According to a study performed by the National Center for Education Statistics, 14% of students between the age range of 3 and 18 do not have access to the internet. Those with a lower socio-economic status tend to cut their budgets by not installing internet in their homes. Public Schools have taken the lead in ensuring proper technology access and education in the classroom to better prepare children for the high-tech world, but there is still a clear difference between online contributions from those with and without experience on the internet.

Civic technology initiatives include FixMyStreet, developed by mySociety in the United Kingdom to report local infrastructure problems; Decide Madrid in Spain, which supports public proposals and participatory budgeting; and Taiwan's vTaiwan, which uses digital tools for public deliberation. In Spain, Iván Nabalón initiated Civitana, a project focused on digital civic participation, including electronic voting and citizen proposals, as documented by El Norte de Castilla in 2015.

== See also ==
- Collaborative e-democracy
- Digital citizen
- E-government
- Government by algorithm
- Open government
- Service design
