= Resistbot =

Automated U.S. constituent civic engagement platform

- Founder: Eric Ries and Jason Putorti
- Founded at: San Francisco
- Type: 501(c)(4)
- Legal status: Active
- Purpose: Civic engagement
- Services: Delivering letters or calls to elected officials in the U.S.; registering or checking voter registrations; locating polling places, town halls, and political rallies; and related services.
- Executive Director: Jason Putorti
- Board of directors: Gina Bianchini, Jason Putorti, Eric Ries
- Website: resist.bot

Resistbot is a service that people in the United States can use to compose and send letters to elected officials from the messaging apps on their mobile phones, with the goal being that the task can be completed in "under two minutes". It identifies a user's federal, state, and city elected officials, then provides an electronic service to deliver to those officials, as well as to local newspapers, and to publish online. As the platform has developed, Resistbot has added functionality such as confirming voter registrations, locating town halls, finding volunteer opportunities, and locating polling places. Resistbot has been funded by over 24,000 small-dollar donations as of September 12, 2017, and is built and maintained by volunteers.

== History ==
Resistbot was established by Eric Ries and Jason Putorti in January 2017. Jason Putorti attended the University of Pittsburgh where he graduated with a BS in computer science. Before launching Resistbot, he served as the designer at AngelList and previously co-founded Causes and Votizen. He expresses that one of his goals in creating Resistbot was to create a universal way to increase civic engagement and civic education. Though the program was founded to oppose the actions of the Trump administration, it functions as an unbiased channel, allowing users to compose their own messages. Unlike many other advocacy efforts, it provides no scripts to users. Donations from users pay for postage for letters and voter registration forms, faxes and calls to officials, and texts between the users and the service. When Resistbot began, letters were faxed to officials' offices. However, as the program received more heavy usage, and officials started to unplug their fax machines, it switched to electronic delivery as a primary channel, with faxes, postal letters, and hand deliveries as secondary methods. The first states that had access to Resistbot's feature of texting one's state legislature were Arizona, California, Florida, Maryland, New Jersey, Ohio, Oklahoma, South Carolina, Texas, Utah, and Washington. Between June 21 and 22, 2018 alone, Resistbot volunteers delivered 12,781 letters to the U.S. Senate, largely about family separation. Those letters represented only a small sample of deliveries overall. Within five months of launch Resistbot had 730,000 users, by six months 1 million, and after fifteen months 4.5 million. As of 2023, nearly 10 million people have used the service to send 35 million letters, and Resistbot has handled 450 million text messages.

== Usage and reception ==
Resistbot has been featured on many news and magazine sites including Recode, Teen Vogue, Fast Company, Engadget, GOOD Magazine, The Guardian, The Miami Herald, and Huffington Post. In an interview with Recode, Putorti acknowledged that though the product's main purpose was to voice those in opposition to the Trump Presidency, the system delivers all messages without regard to political views. Resistbot's Twitter feed features many responses by members of Congress to users who have sent messages through the software. It was called "The Most Genius Thing Of 2017" by GOOD magazine.

In April 2017 Resistbot added a feature called "Letters to the Editor". This feature allows users to choose to send their message both to their elected official, and directly to a local newspaper or media source in their area. This allows messages to be seen by their communities and can help gain support for their cause, potentially leading to more people texting Resistbot about this cause.

During the congressional recess in August 2017, Resistbot helped to facilitate what they called flash-mobs. When members of congress were refusing to attend town hall meetings, Resistbot encouraged users to organize or protest in order to help gain support for their causes.

In November 2017, Resistbot was used as a channel by Medium to push net neutrality letters to Congress. The article published seven letter templates for readers to send to their representatives in favor of net neutrality. Individuals couldn't send a message to the FCC or its commissioners, only the elected officials who attend to the address that the user enters into the prompts. In January 2018, The Peace Report published an article pushing its users to send letters to government officials through Resistbot in order to oppose the construction of two new military bases in Okinawa. The article contained a letter template for readers to copy and paste to Congress representatives. In February 2018, WUSA TV fact checked and verified that texting "NRA" to Resistbot would tell users how their officials had benefited, or been hurt by, NRA contributions. In September 2018, InStyle listed it as a way to "make your voice heard," regarding the nomination of Brett Kavanaugh.

In 2020, Resistbot was cited as a way to help save the United States Postal Service by Mashable, New York, and Vogue. The "widespread claims" were fact-checked by Snopes, which tested the service and wrote, "the process took around five minutes with the only significant delay coming when the user awaits a verification code sent to their email address. Snopes could confirm that the letter was sent to the representatives in question because the office of one of them, U.S. Rep. Matt Cartwright, D-Pennsylvania, happened to respond later on with an acknowledgement that explicitly addressed the topic of the letter."

== Criticisms and challenges ==
In March 2017, Micah L. Sifry wrote, "making it easier to digitally contact your Member of Congress paradoxically makes it more likely that they will discount the value of your opinion," in a criticism of the service. Lee Drutman similarly wrote, "these services and technologies are cheapening the meaning of civic engagement by turning it into a commodity..."

== See also ==
- Civic technology
- 5 Calls
