= Code for Canada =

Nonprofit organization

- Established: 2017
- Chief Executive Officer: Dorothy Eng
- Location: Toronto, Ontario
- Website: codefor.ca

Code for Canada is a nonprofit organization (NPO) a national nonprofit dedicated to improving life in Canada using technology, data, and design. They partner with governments and nonprofits to co-develop digital solutions that are more accessible, inclusive, and effective at meeting people's needs.

== Background ==
According to a January 2017 interview with Gabe Sawhney, Code for Canada Executive Director and Co-founder of NOW Magazine, Code for Canada is modeled after Code for America and its "chapters in Australia, Germany, Mexico and Pakistan." Sawhney said that their target audience included committed tech innovators, inside and outside government, willing to partner to find technological and design solutions for civic issues. Code for Canada, is similar to the civic technology movement in the United States, Code for America and Code for Australia.

In April 2017, Deb Matthews, the Ontario minister for digital governance announced that the Province of Ontario was co-founding Code for Canada with a contribution of $700,000. Code for Canada's designers and coders work with government to improve and/or create "high-technology" coding that is "simpler, faster and easier to use", resulting in the provision of better government services that cost less.

Since 2021, founding board member Dorothy Eng has acted as the organization’s CEO.

== Mission ==
Code for Canada works with communities and government in Canada to improve digital technologies. (Note: According to their Twitter account, "We help governments and communities in Canada harness the power of digital.")

== Service offerings ==
To achieve their mission, Code for Canada offers four services,

"Digital Solution Co-Development" involves problem scoping, recruiting and deploying a team of digital talent, and then enabling an hands-on learning experience for internal staff and stakeholders to "ensure you have total ownership over the final product, avoid vendor lock-in, and leave our work together with increased digital skills and capacity."

"Options Analysis" is similar to ‘build/buy/partner analysis’ commonly leveraged in the private sector. Code for Canada "conduct[s] an in-depth assessment of your digital product or service" to find the option best fit for an organization’s capacity, needs and resources.

"Inclusive User Research" connects teams with users ("residents from across Canada with a wide range of backgrounds, lived experiences and abilities") to test digital products and services. The user feedback is incorporated in product design and development to create "best-in-class digital solution[s] that meet user needs."

"Civic Tech Marketplace connects public-benefit organizations with digital professionals who are ready to volunteer their skills towards a cause they care about."

== 2017 to 2021 fellowship program ==
Through their fellowship program, Code for Canada, fellows who are digital technology and design experts, spent 10 months working collaboratively with public servants in government departments to improve services. Fellows demonstrated the most recent "methods in software development, design thinking, user experience research and product management," and examine how the "Internet and data can support and serve Canadian civil society, and our values of fairness and inclusivity."

In 2017 Code for Canada ran the fellowship with the Canadian Digital Service (CDS) and Veterans Affairs Canada (VAC). (Note: "The Code for Canada fellowship embeds technology professionals into government, where they work alongside public servants to build great digital services for residents.") By January 2017, Code for Canada had already received 300 applications for their first team of six Fellows.

Leon Lukashevsky, a 2017 fellow with "web development skills", described how Code for Canada fellows work to make "Canadian civil services" more "digitally savvy". In his 2017 article in Medium, Lukashevsky wrote that, "Modern governments need to understand and leverage the Internet to actualize public policy and meet residents’ expectations." He described the Fellows as "democracy-driven" and compared it to the process behind the creation of e-Estonia, and its underlying digital platform X-Road. (Note: The December 18, 2017 The New Yorker article described Tarvi Martens, a systems architect as the "putative grandfather of Estonia’s digital platform.") Estonia, tagged the "Digital Republic" by The New Yorker, launched e-Estonia in 2017 to improve interactions between citizens and government through electronic solutions. He noted that X-Road architects had "turned to democratic ideals for guidance." Lukashevsky described the goal of this collaboration with CDS and VAC, was to "improve Canadian veterans' awareness of — and access to — benefits and services ... to improve their quality of life."

In 2018, Christine Lee, Product Strategy, Design, and Management expert and Code for Canada fellow with the Government of Ontario’s Ministry of Advanced Education & Skill Development, led a team "building products collaboratively using discovery sprints". Lee's professional background is in "digital product management, development, and finance".

Code for Canada sunsetted its fellowship program in 2021. It now works with government and non-profit partners on a project-to-project basis, helping them create digital products and services for the public good.

== See also ==
- Code for America
- Code for America Commons (CfA)
- Civic Commons
