= April 2015 Nepal earthquake =

Magnitude 7.9 earthquake in Nepal

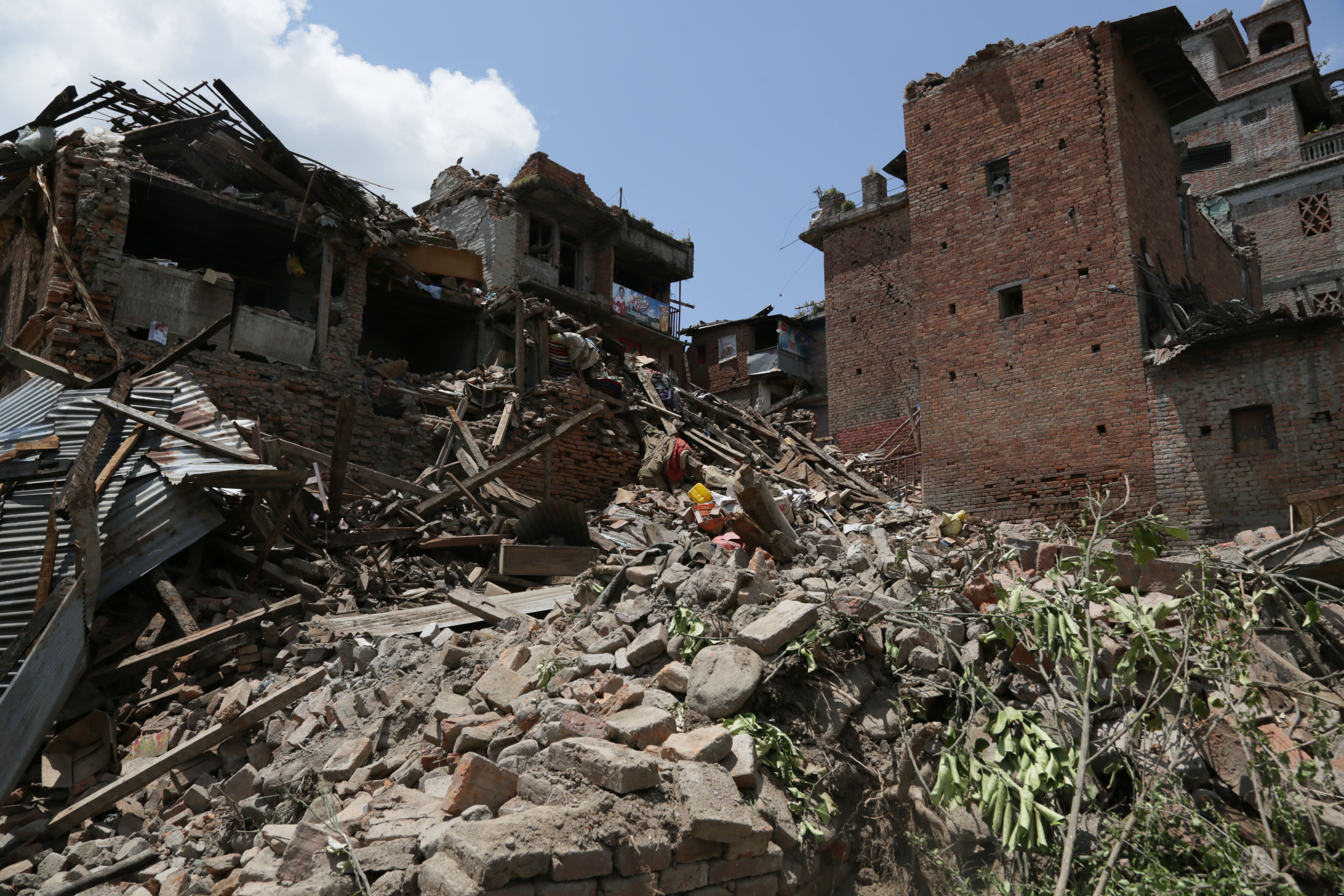
- Damaged homes in Kathmandu after the April mainshock.

- UTC time: 2015-04-25 06:11:25
- ISC event: 607208674
- USGS-ANSS: ComCat
- Local date: 25 April 2015; 11 years ago
- Local time: 11:56:25 NST
- Duration: 50 seconds
- Magnitude: M_{w} 7.8–7.9 M_{s} 8.1
- Depth: 8.2 km (5.1 mi)
- Epicenter: 28.230°N 84.731°E
- Fault: Main Himalayan Thrust
- Type: Thrust
- Areas affected: Nepal; India; China; Bangladesh
- Total damage: $10 billion (about 50% of Nepal's nominal GDP at that time.)
- Max. intensity: MMI X (Extreme)
- Peak acceleration: 0.25 g
- Peak velocity: 108 cm/s
- Landslides: 21
- Foreshocks: 7
- Aftershocks: 7.3 M_{w} on 12 May at 12:50; 6.7 M_{w} on 26 April at 12:54; 459 aftershocks of 4 M_{w} and above as of 24 May 2016
- Casualties: 8,962 dead in Nepal, 21,952 injured, 3.5 million homeless

The April 2015 Nepal earthquake (also known as the Gorkha earthquake) killed 8,962 people and injured 21,952 across the countries of Nepal, India, China and Bangladesh. It occurred at 11:56 Nepal Standard Time on Saturday 25 April 2015, with a magnitude of M_{w} 7.8–7.9 or M_{s} 8.1 and a maximum Mercalli Intensity of X (Extreme). Its epicenter was east of Gorkha District at Barpak, Gorkha, roughly 85 km (53 mi) northwest of central Kathmandu, and its hypocenter was at a depth of approximately 8.2 km (5.1 mi). It was the worst natural disaster to strike Nepal since the 1934 Nepal–India earthquake. The ground motion recorded in Kathmandu, the capital of Nepal, was of low frequency, which, along with its occurrence at an hour when many people in rural areas were working outdoors, decreased the loss of human lives.

The earthquake triggered an avalanche on Mount Everest, killing 22 people, the deadliest incident on the mountain on record. The earthquake triggered another huge avalanche in the Langtang valley, where 250 people were reported missing.

Hundreds of thousands of Nepalese were made homeless with entire villages flattened across many districts of the country. Centuries-old buildings were destroyed at UNESCO World Heritage Sites in the Kathmandu Valley, including some at the Kathmandu Durbar Square, the Patan Durbar Square, the Bhaktapur Durbar Square, the Changu Narayan Temple, the Boudhanath stupa, and the Swayambhunath stupa. Geophysicists and other experts had warned for decades that Nepal was vulnerable to a deadly earthquake, particularly because of its geology, urbanization, and architecture. Dharahara, also called Bhimsen Tower, a nine-storey 61.88-metre (203.0 ft) tall tower, was destroyed. It was a part of the architecture of Kathmandu recognized by UNESCO.

Continued aftershocks occurred throughout Nepal at intervals of 15–20 minutes, with one shock reaching a magnitude of 6.7 on 26 April at 12:54:08 NST. The country also had a continued risk of landslides.

A major aftershock occurred on 12 May 2015 at 12:50 NST with a moment magnitude (M_{w}) of 7.3. The epicenter was near the Chinese border between the capital, Kathmandu, and Mount Everest. More than 200 people were killed and over 2,500 were injured by this aftershock, and many were left homeless.

== Earthquake ==
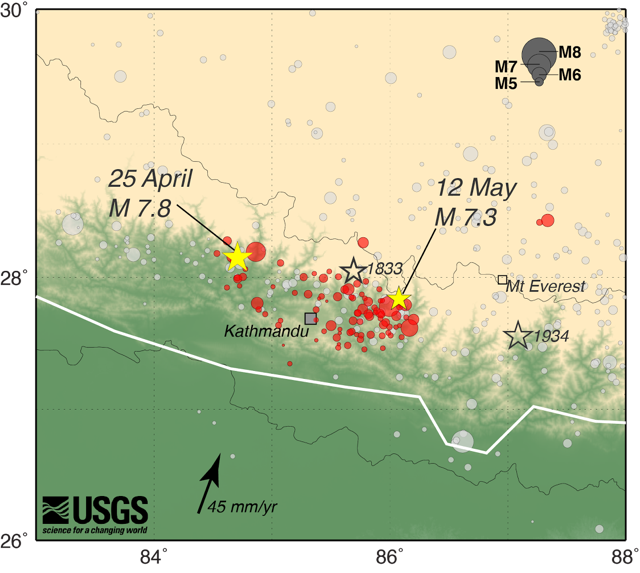
Map of the earthquake and aftershocks at 12 May, showing location of major historical earthquakes

The earthquake occurred on 25 April 2015 at 11:56 am NPT (06:11:25 UTC) at a depth of approximately 8.2 km (5.1 mi) (which is considered shallow and therefore more damaging than quakes that originate deeper in the ground), with its epicentre approximately 34 km (21 mi) southeast of Lamjung, Nepal, lasting approximately 50 seconds. The earthquake was initially reported as M_{ww} 7.5 by the United States Geological Survey (USGS) before it was quickly upgraded to M_{ww} 7.8, while the Global Centroid Moment Tensor (GCMT) reported a magnitude of M_{w} 7.9. The China Earthquake Networks Center (CENC) reported the earthquake's magnitude to be 8.1 M_{s}. The India Meteorological Department (IMD) said two powerful quakes were registered in Nepal at 06:11 UTC and 06:45 UTC. The first quake had its epicenter was identified at a distance of 80 km to the northwest of Kathmandu, the capital of Nepal. Bharatpur was the nearest major city to the main earthquake, 53 km (33 mi) as the crow flies from the epicenter. The second earthquake was somewhat less powerful at 6.6 M_{w}. It occurred 65 km (40 mi) east of Kathmandu and its seismic focus lay at a depth of 10 km (6.2 mi) below the earth's surface. Over 38 aftershocks of magnitude 4.5 M_{w} or greater occurred in the day following the initial earthquake, including one of 6.8 M_{w}.

According to the USGS, the earthquake was caused by a sudden short sharp upthrust along the convergent boundary where the Indian plate, carrying India, is slowly diving underneath the Eurasian plate, carrying much of Europe and Asia. Kathmandu, situated on a block of crust approximately 120 km (74 miles) wide and 60 km (37 miles) long, shifted 3 m (10 ft) to the south in just 30 seconds.

The risk of a large earthquake was well known beforehand. In 2013, in an interview with seismologist Vinod Kumar Gaur, The Hindu quoted him as saying, "Calculations show that there is sufficient accumulated energy [in the Main Frontal Thrust], now to produce an 8-magnitude earthquake. I cannot say when. It may not happen tomorrow, but it could possibly happen sometime this century, or wait longer to produce a much larger one." According to Brian Tucker, founder of a nonprofit organization devoted to reducing casualties from natural disasters, some government officials had expressed confidence that such an earthquake would not occur again. Tucker recounted a conversation he had with a government official in the 1990s who said, "We don't have to worry about earthquakes anymore, because we already had an earthquake." The previous earthquake to which he referred occurred in 1934. In fact, the 600-km-long Central Himalayan Gap hadn't ruptured since 1505.

== Geology ==
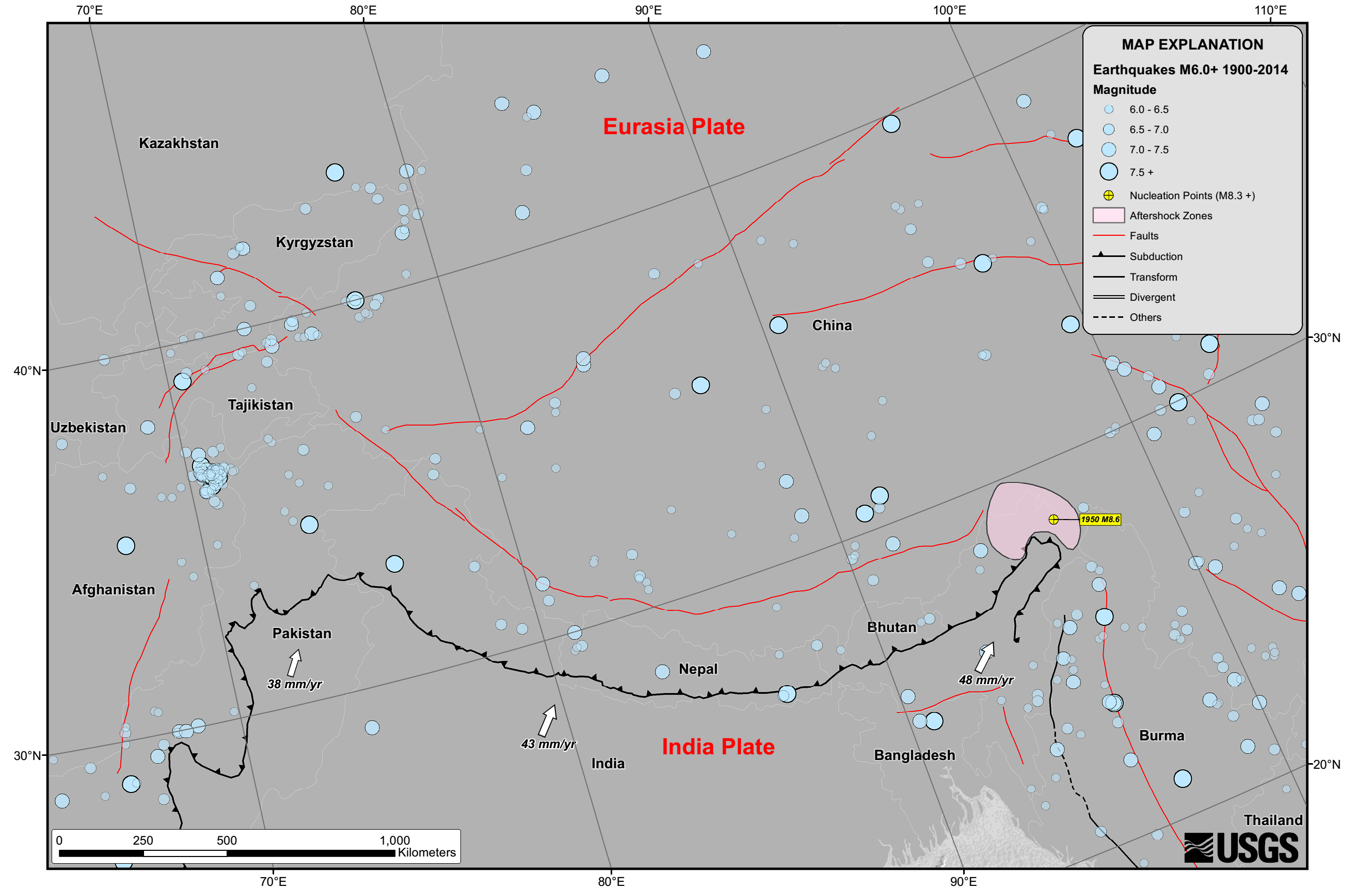
M6+ Himalayan region earthquakes, 1900–2014

Nepal lies towards the southern limit of the diffuse collisional boundary where the Indian plate underthrusts the Eurasian plate, occupying the central sector of the Himalayan arc, nearly one-third of the 2,400 km (1,500 mi) long Himalayas. Geologically, the Nepal Himalayas are subdivided into five tectonic zones from north to south, east to west, and almost parallel to sub-parallel. These five distinct morpho-geotectonic zones are: (1) Terai Plain; (2) Sub Himalaya (Shivalik Range); (3) Lesser Himalaya (Mahabharat Range and mid valleys); (4) Higher Himalaya; and (5) Inner Himalaya (Tibetan Tethys). Each of these zones is clearly identified by its morphological, geological, and tectonic features.

The convergence rate between the plates in central Nepal is about 45 mm (1.8 in) per year. The location, magnitude, and focal mechanism of the earthquake suggest that it was caused by a slip along the Main Frontal Thrust.

The earthquake's effects were amplified in Kathmandu as it sits on the Kathmandu Basin, which contains up to 600 m (2,000 ft) of sedimentary rocks, representing the infilling of a lake.

Based on a study published in 2014, of the Main Frontal Thrust, on average a great earthquake occurs every 750 ± 140 and 870 ± 350 years in the east Nepal region. A study from 2015 found a 700-year delay between earthquakes in the region. The study also suggests that because of tectonic stress buildup, the 1934 earthquake and the 2015 quake are connected, following a historic earthquake pattern. A 2016 study on historical great (M ≥ 8) earthquake pairs and cycles found that associated great earthquakes are likely to occur in the West China region through the 2020s.

=== Intensity ===
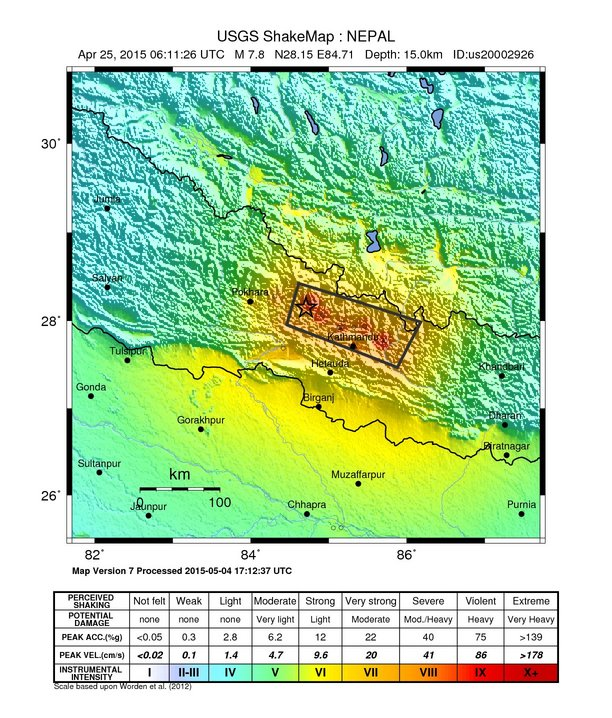
USGS shakemap

According to the USGS website, the maximum intensity was VIII (Severe), however certain reports state an intensity of X (Extreme) or higher. In most of Kathmandu the intensity was VIII-IX, as evidenced by the numerous undamaged water towers installed on top of undamaged multi story buildings. Tremors were felt in the neighboring Indian states of Bihar, Uttar Pradesh, Assam, West Bengal, Odisha, Sikkim, Jharkhand, Uttarakhand, Gujarat, in the National Capital Region around New Delhi and as far south as Karnataka. Damage was extensive in northern Bihar and minor damage was also reported from parts of Odisha. Shaking was felt in high-rise buildings as far as Kochi in the southern state of Kerala. The intensity in Patna was V (Moderate). The intensity was IV (Light) in Dhaka, Bangladesh. The earthquake was also experienced across southwest China, ranging from the Tibet Autonomous Region to Chengdu, which is 1,900 km (1,200 mi) away from the epicenter. Tremors were felt in Pakistan and Bhutan.

=== Aftershocks ===
Aftershocks of 2015 Nepal earthquake

A series of aftershocks began immediately after the mainshock, at intervals of 15–30 minutes, with one aftershock reaching 6.6M_{w} within 34 minutes of the initial quake. A major aftershock of magnitude 6.9 M_{w} occurred on 26 April 2015 in the same region at 12:54 NST (07:08 UTC), with an epicenter located about 17 km (11 mi) south of Kodari, Nepal. The aftershock caused fresh avalanches on Mount Everest and was felt in many places in northern India including Kolkata, Siliguri, Jalpaiguri, and Assam. The aftershock caused a landslide on the Koshi Highway, which blocked the section of the road between Bhedetar and Mulghat.

A model of GeoGateway, based on a United States Geological Survey mechanism of a near-horizontal fault as well as the location of aftershocks showed that the fault had an 11° dip towards the north, striking at 295°, was 50 km (31 mi) wide, 150 km (93 mi) long, and had a dip slip of 3 m (9.8 ft). The USGS says the aftershock registered at a shallow depth of 10 km (6.2 mi).

As of 24 May 2016, 459 aftershocks had occurred with different epicenters and magnitudes equal to or above 4 M_{w} (out of which 51 aftershocks are equal to or above 5 M_{w} and 5 aftershocks above 6 M_{w}) and more than 20,000 aftershocks less than 4 M_{w}.

=== 12 May 2015 earthquake ===
A second major earthquake occurred on 12 May 2015 at 12:50 NST with a moment magnitude (M_{w}) of 7.3M_{w} 18 km (11 mi) southeast of Kodari. The epicenter was near the Chinese border between the capital city of Kathmandu and Mount Everest. It struck at a depth of 18.5 km (11.5 miles). This earthquake occurred along the same fault as the original magnitude 7.8 earthquake of 25 April but further to the east. As such, it is considered an aftershock of the 25 April quake. Tremors were also felt in northern parts of India including Bihar, Uttar Pradesh, West Bengal and other North-Indian States. At least 153 people died in Nepal as a result of the aftershock and about 2,500 were injured. 62 others died in India, two in Bangladesh, and one in China.

== Aftermath ==
Disastrous events in very poor and politically paralyzed nations such as Nepal often become a long drawn out chain of events, in that one disaster feeds into another for years or even decades on end. The aftereffects of the earthquake had subsequent effects on a myriad of things: human trafficking, labour cost and availability, rental and property cost burdens, urbanization, private and public debt burdens, mental health, politics, tourism, disease, and damage to the healthcare system. A survey some 30 months later found only 12% of the reconstruction money had been distributed, and those without land were locked out of financial support, exacerbating the social divide and feeding marginalization.

=== More direct effects ===
Some disasters that came with the monsoon season were suspected to be related to the earthquake. There was a landslip on 11 June, killing 53 people. Meanwhile, a glacial lake had burst in the particularly hard-hit Solukhumbhu district. Whether or not the quake contributed to such events is often unknown and unresearched, but it is certainly possible.

Casualties by country, all nationalities
Country	Deaths	Injuries	Ref.
Nepal	8,857	22,304	
India	78	560	
China	25	383	
Bangladesh	4	200	
Total	8,964	23,447	

Foreign casualties in Nepal
Country	Deaths	Ref.
India	78	
France	10	
Spain	7	
United States	7	
Germany	5	
China	4	
Italy	4	
Canada	2	
Russia	2	
(dual); Australia; India	1	
Estonia	1	
Hong Kong	1	
Israel	1	
Japan	1	
Malaysia	1	
New Zealand	1	
United Kingdom	1	
Total	127	

=== Casualties ===
==== Nepal ====
The earthquake killed at least 8,857 people in Nepal and injured nearly three times as many. The rural death toll may have been minimized by the fact that most villagers were outdoors working when the quake hit. As of 15 May, 6,271 people, including 1,700 from the 12 May aftershock, were still receiving treatment for their injuries. Nearly 3.5 million people were left homeless, causing around 2.6 million internal displacements.

The Himalayan Times reported that as many as 20,000 foreign nationals may have been visiting Nepal at the time of the earthquake, although reports of foreign deaths were relatively low.

==== India ====
A total of 78 deaths were reported in India – including 58 in Bihar, 16 in Uttar Pradesh, 3 in West Bengal and 1 in Rajasthan.

==== China ====
Twenty-seven people were confirmed dead, 383 were injured and 4 were missing, all from the Tibet Autonomous Region. The quake destroyed 2,500 houses and damaged 24,700 others across 19 counties in Tibet, affecting nearly 300,000 people, among whom 47,500 were displaced, while a total of 82 temples were also damaged. The counties of Gyirong, Nyalam and Tingri in Xigazê were worst hit, where nearly 80 percent of the houses in the three counties collapsed.

==== Bangladesh ====
Four people were killed and 18 districts were affected by the earthquake in Bangladesh. A six-story building partially collapsed and two garment factories tilted in Dhaka. A 22-year-old man died when trying to flee the Dhaka Medical College in a panic. In Tangail, a woman died trying to escape a building. Another woman was crushed to death by a collapsed wall while a teacher died of a heart attack during the earthquake.

==== Avalanches on Mount Everest ====
This earthquake caused avalanches on Mount Everest. At least 19 died, with at least 120 others injured or missing.

==== Landslides in the Langtang Valley ====
In the Langtang valley located in Langtang National Park, 329 people were reported missing after an avalanche hit the village of Ghodatabela and the village of Langtang. The avalanche was estimated to have been two to three kilometres wide. Ghodatabela was an area popular on the Langtang trekking route. The village of Langtang was destroyed by the avalanche. Smaller settlements on the outskirts of Langtang were buried during the earthquake, such as Chyamki, Thangsyap, and Mundu. Twelve locals and two foreigners were believed to have survived. Smaller landslides occurred in the Trishuli River Valley with reports of significant damage at Mailung, Simle, and Archale. On 4 May it was announced that 52 bodies had been found in the Langtang area, of which seven were bodies of foreigners.

According to geological models, the frequency and intensity of future landslides in the Langtang Valley is due to increase in the coming decades. This is attributable directly to the effect of the earthquake, which caused widespread fracturing in the grounds of the Langtang area.

=== Damage ===
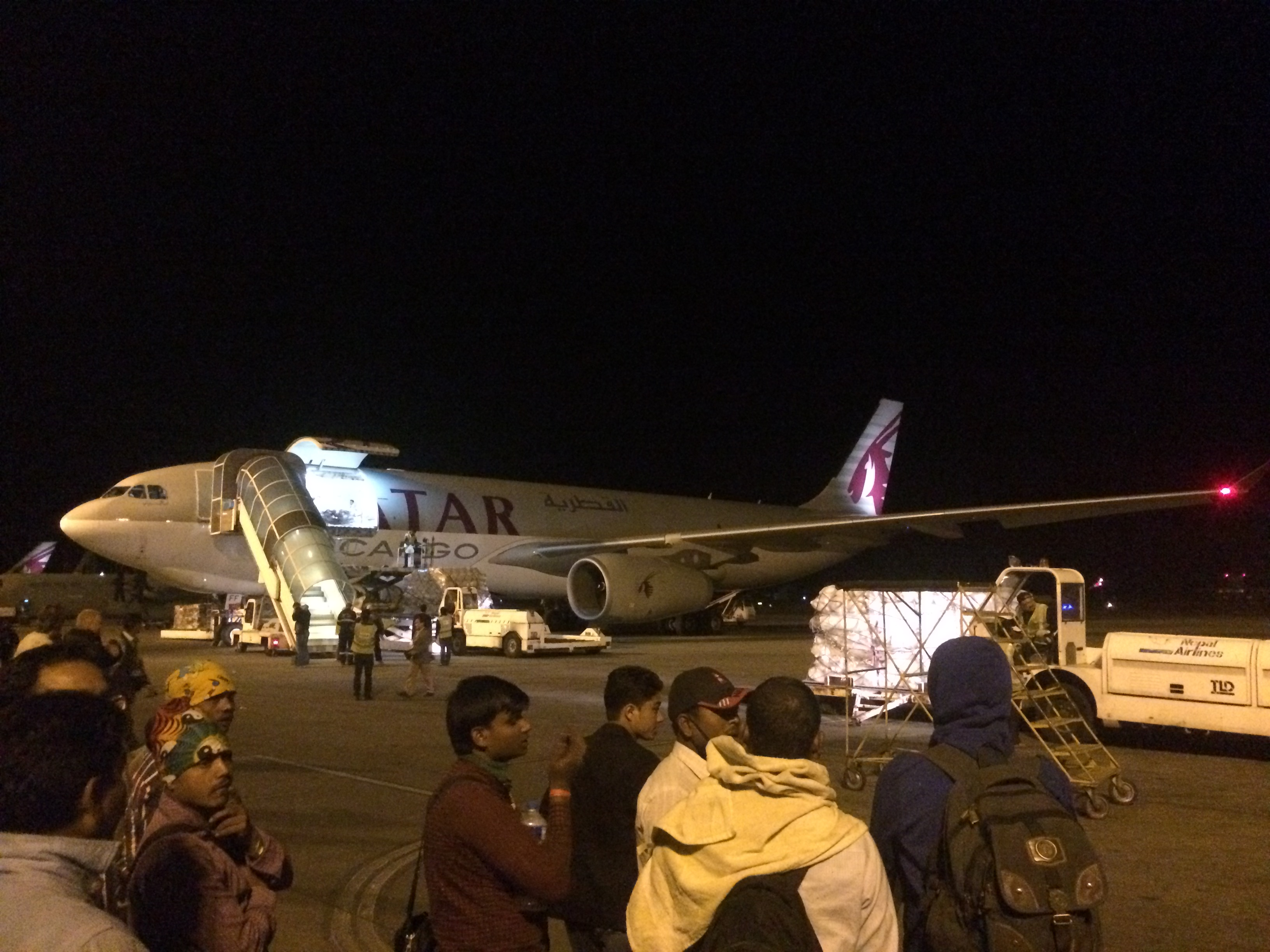
People waiting on airport tarmac for flights after aftershocks forced the airport to open all exit doors

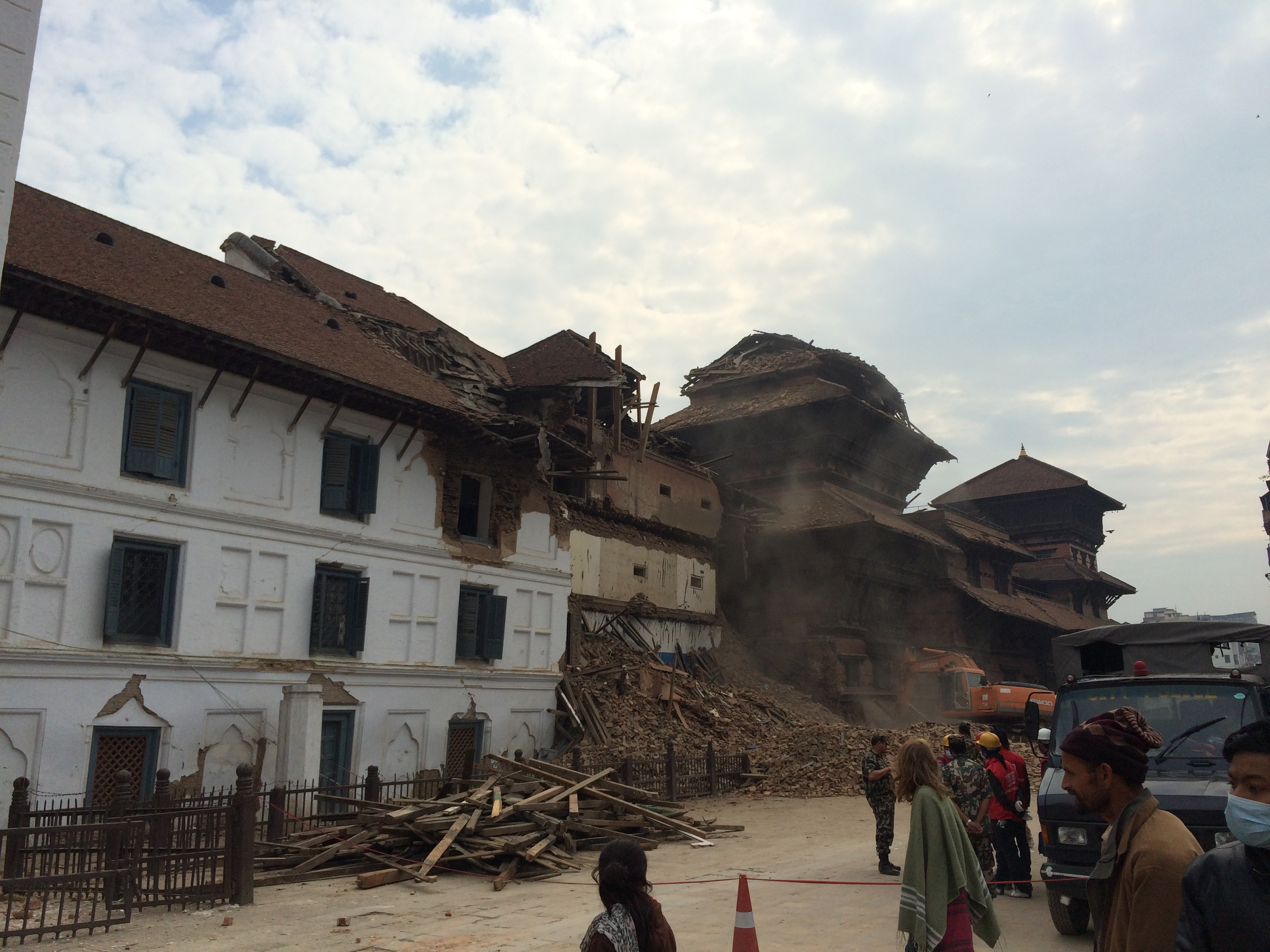
Damage in the Basantpur Durbar Square

Thousands of houses were destroyed across many districts of the country, with entire villages flattened, especially those near the epicenter.

The Tribhuvan International Airport serving Kathmandu was closed immediately after the earthquake, but was re-opened later in the day for relief operations and, later, for some commercial flights. It subsequently shut down operations sporadically due to aftershocks, and on 3 May was closed temporarily to the largest planes for fear of runway damage. During strong aftershocks, the airport opened all boarding-lounge exit doors onto the tarmac, allowing people who were waiting post security and immigration to flee to the open spaces of the runway tarmac. Many remained outside as planes were delayed and the airport swelled to capacity. The airport facilities suffered damage and there was no running water or operating toilets in the airport lounges. Few airport workers were at their posts; most were killed in the earthquake or had to deal with its aftereffects.

Flights resumed from Pokhara, to the west of the epicentre, on 27 April.

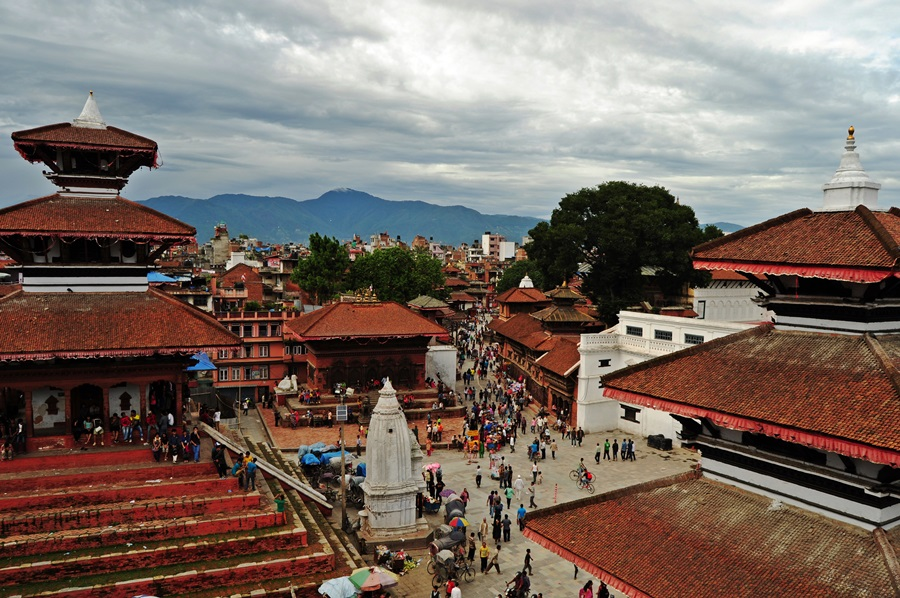
Kathmandu Durbar Square before the earthquake

Several of the churches in the Kathmandu valley were destroyed. As Saturday is the principal day of Christian worship in Nepal, 500 people were reported to have died in the collapses.

Several temples on Kathmandu Durbar Square, a UNESCO World Heritage Site, collapsed, as did the Dharahara tower, built in 1832; the collapse of the latter structure killed at least 180 people, Manakamana Temple in Gorkha, previously damaged in an earlier quake, tilted several inches further. The northern side of Janaki Mandir in Janakpur was reported to have been damaged. Several temples, including Kasthamandap, Panchtale temple, the top levels of the nine-story Basantapur Durbar, the Dasa Avtar temple and two shrines located behind the Shiva Parvati temple were demolished by the quake. Some other monuments including the Taleju Bhawani Temple partially collapsed.

The top of the Jaya Bageshwari Temple in Gaushala and some parts of the Pashupatinath Temple, Swyambhunath, Boudhanath Stupa, Ratna Mandir, inside Rani Pokhari, and Durbar High School have been destroyed.

In Patan, the Char Narayan Mandir, the statue of Yog Narendra Malla, a pati inside Patan Durbar Square, the Taleju Temple, the Hari Shankar, Uma Maheshwar Temple and the Machhindranath Temple in Bungamati were destroyed. In Tripureshwar, the Kal Mochan Ghat, a temple inspired by Mughal architecture, was completely destroyed and the nearby Tripura Sundari also suffered significant damage. In Bhaktapur, several monuments, including the Phasi Deva temple, the Chardham temple and the 17th century Vatsala Durga Temple were fully or partially destroyed.

Outside the Valley, the Manakamana Temple in Gorkha, the Gorkha Durbar, the Palanchok Bhagwati, in Kabhrepalanchok District, the Rani Mahal in Palpa District, the Churiyamai in Makwanpur District, the Dolakha Bhimsensthan in Dolakha District, and the Nuwakot Durbar suffered varying degrees of damage. Historian Prushottam Lochan Shrestha stated, "We have lost most of the monuments that had been designated as World Heritage Sites in Kathmandu, Bhaktapur and Lalitpur District, Nepal. They cannot be restored to their original states." The northeastern parts of India also received major damage. Heavy shocks were felt in the states of Uttrakhand, Uttar Pradesh, West Bengal and others. Huge damage was caused to the property and the lives of the people.

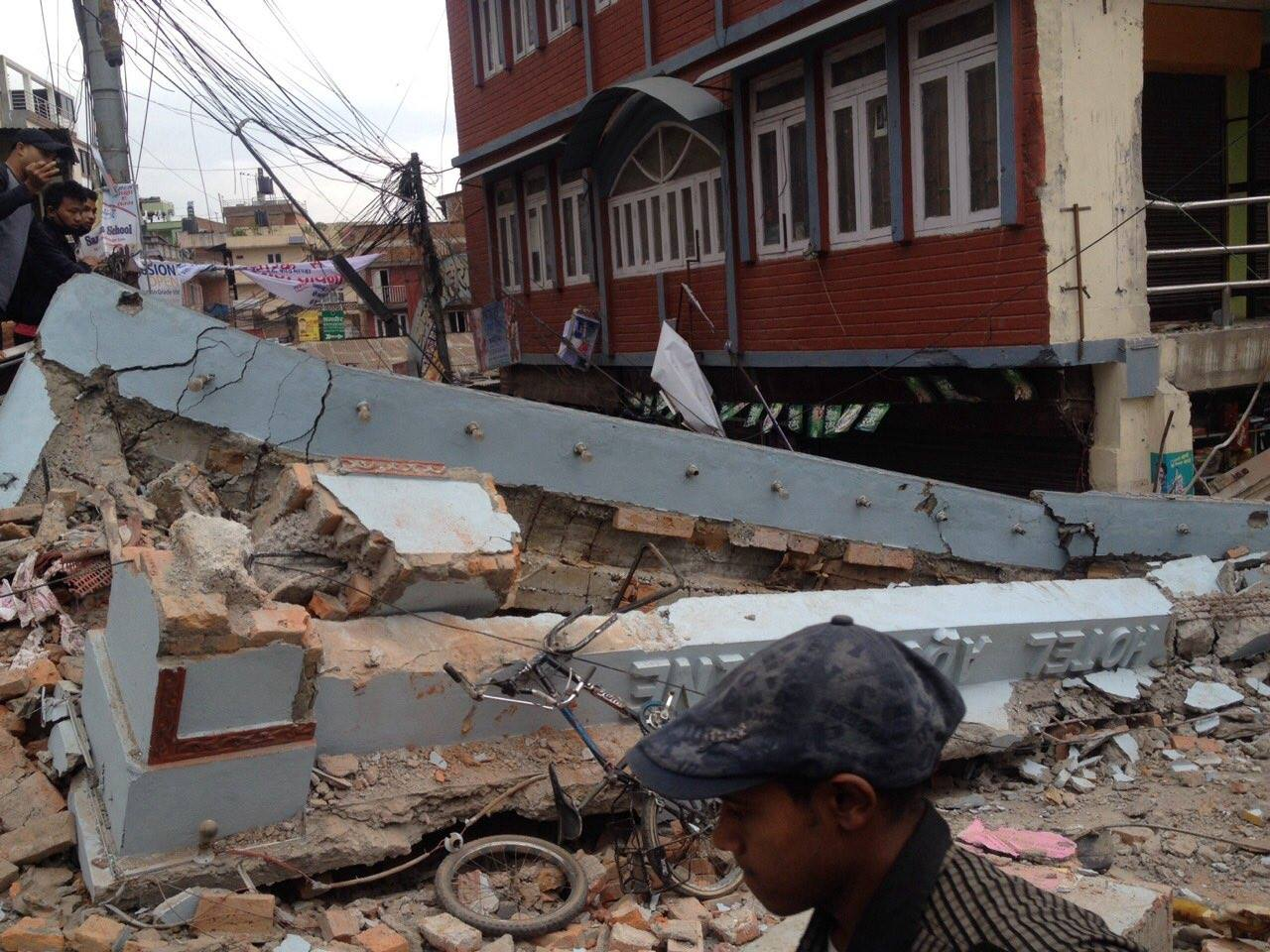
Building damage as a result of the earthquake

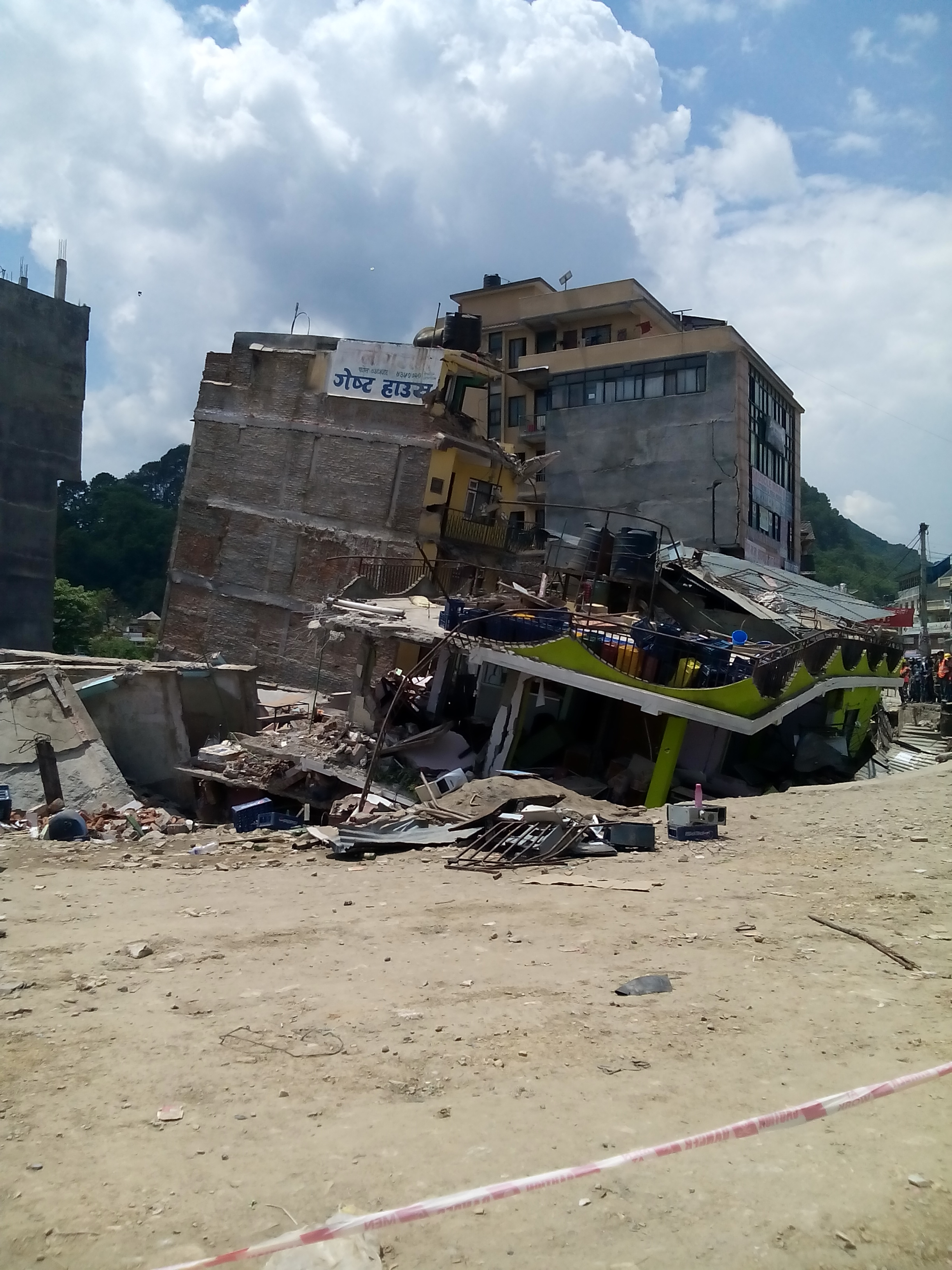
Damaged building in Balaju area

=== Economic loss ===
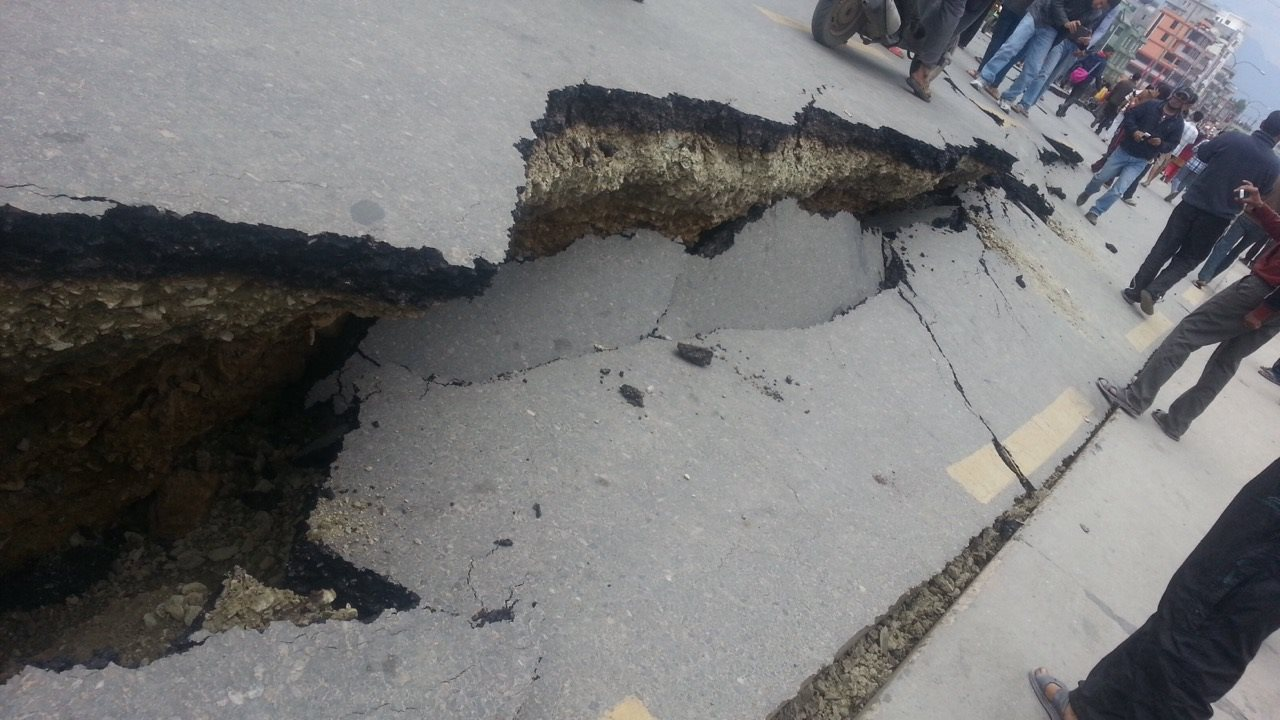
Road damage in Nepal

Concern was expressed that harvests could be reduced or lost this season as people affected by the earthquake would have only a short time to plant crops before the onset of the Monsoon rains.

Nepal, with a total Gross Domestic Product of US$19.921 billion (according to a 2012 estimate), is one of Asia's poorest countries, and has little ability to fund a major reconstruction effort on its own. Even before the quake, the Asian Development Bank estimated that it would need to spend about four times more than it currently does annually on infrastructure through to 2020 to attract investment. The U.S. Geological Survey initially estimated economic losses from the tremor at 9 per cent to 50 per cent of gross domestic product, with a best guess of 35 per cent. "It's too hard for now to tell the extent of the damage and the effect on Nepal's GDP", according to Hun Kim, an Asian Development Bank (ADB) official. The ADB said on the 28th that it would provide a US$3 million grant to Nepal for immediate relief efforts, and up to US$200 million for the first phase of rehabilitation.

Rajiv Biswas, an economist at a Colorado-based consultancy, said that rebuilding the economy will need international effort over the next few years as it could "easily exceed" US$5 billion.

More recent studies estimate the damage from the earthquake to be closer to US$10 billion (which would be around 50% of Nepal's GDP at the time).

=== Social effects ===
It was reported that the survivors were preyed upon by human traffickers involved in the supply of girls and women to the brothels of South Asia. These traffickers took advantage of the chaos that resulted from the aftermath of the earthquake. The most affected were women from poor communities who lost their homes. In response to the unsafe conditions of the temporary campsites, international organizations implemented Safety Committees which were provided cash grants for necessities like additional toilets and bathrooms.

=== Most affected ===
Single women had very little access to relief, according to a report by the Inter-party Women's Alliance (IPWA). The report also found that violence and rapes against women and minors have increased after the earthquake. Additionally, the earthquake has significantly affected certain groups of people. Tibeto-Burman peoples were hardest hit as they tend to inhabit the higher slopes of mountains as opposed to the central valleys and are less educated and connected. All of these factors make them harder to access. According to a government survey, malnutrition in children has worsened considerably some 3 months after the quake, with the most undernourished being Tamang and Chepang peoples. Before the quake, 41 percent of children under five were stunted, 29 percent were underweight and 11 percent were emaciated, according to the World Food Programme.

=== Disease ===
Though a feared mass cholera outbreak failed to materialize (apart from sporadic reports), other outbreaks were reported. At least 13 people died of scrub typhus while 240 people were taken ill since the disease was first diagnosed in the country in August 2015 until September 2016. The mental and emotional impact of an earthquake is the other invisible disaster. Medical Doctors from India, Ramachandra Kamath, Edmond Fernandes and Prakash Narayan stated that elderly care in disaster was more important than women and child focused one for Nepal earthquake and absence of military support for medical aid providers impacted relief work.

== Rescue and relief ==
About 90% of soldiers from the Nepalese Army were sent to the stricken areas in the aftermath of the earthquake under Operation Sankat Mochan, with volunteers mobilized from other parts of the country. Rainfall and aftershocks were factors complicating the rescue efforts, with potential secondary effects like additional landslides and further building collapses being concerns. Impassable roads and damaged communications infrastructure posed substantial challenges to rescue efforts. Survivors were found up to a week after the earthquake.

The Nursing Association of Nepal coordinated patient care for 22,000 people after the April 2015 Nepal earthquake.

As of 1 May international aid agencies like Médecins Sans Frontières and the Red Cross were able to start medically evacuating the critically wounded by helicopter from outlying areas, initially cut-off from the capital city, Kathmandu, and treating others in mobile and makeshift facilities. There was concern about epidemics due to the shortage of clean water, the makeshift nature of living conditions and the lack of toilets.

Emergency workers were able to identify four men who had been trapped in rubble, and rescue them, using advanced heartbeat detection. The four men were trapped in up to ten feet of rubble in the village of Chautara, north of Kathmandu. An international team of rescuers from several countries using FINDER devices found two sets of men under two different collapsed buildings.

Volunteers used crisis mapping to help plan emergency aid work. Local organization Kathmandu Living Labs helped coordinate local knowledge on the ground and collaborated with international crisis mapping and humanitarian organizations. Public volunteers from around the world participated in crowdmapping and added details into online maps. Information was mapped from data input from social media, satellite pictures and drones of passable roads, collapsed houses, stranded, shelterless and starving people, who needed help, and from messages and contact details of people willing to help. On-site volunteers verified these mapping details wherever they could to reduce errors. The technologies used by Kathmandu Living Labs were built on top of existing open source solutions which allowed them to work in a fast and cost effective manner.

Digital mappers, through the Kathmandu Living Labs, were already charting the densely populated Kathmandu Valley, and then focused on earthquake relief. "They were doing an inventory in the poorer communities where they didn't have a very good sense of the quality of buildings," says Cowan, whose students helped add Kathmandu's buildings and roads to OpenStreetMap. First responders, from Nepalese citizens to the Red Cross, the Nepal army and the United Nations used this data. The Nepal earthquake crisis mapping utilized experience gained and lessons learned about planning emergency aid work from earthquakes in Haiti and Indonesia.

India pledged to donate $1 billion in cash and materials to Nepal. India's External Affairs Minister Sushma Swaraj said "I am happy to announce Government of India's pledge for Nepal's post-earthquake reconstruction of Nepali Rupees 10,000 crores, equivalent to one billion US dollars, one fourth of it as Grant." The International Conference on Nepal's Reconstruction has been organised by the Nepalese government to raise funds for rebuilding the country.

Reports are also coming in of sub-standard relief materials and inedible food being sent to Nepal by many of the foreign aid agencies.

A United States Marine Corps helicopter crashed on 12 May while involved in delivering relief supplies. The Bell UH-1Y Venom crashed at Charikot, roughly 45 miles (72 kilometres) east of Kathmandu. Two Nepalese soldiers and six American Marines died in the crash.

Need-fulfillment application, Getmii, launched a special pilot version in partnership with the Red Cross to double daily blood donors at the Kathmandu donation center using the app.

Imaging technologies such as satellites and smartphones, were instrumental to relief efforts in Nepal. GLIMS, group of volunteer scientists from nine nations, were able to provide rapid, systematic mapping of the damaged area, allowing the investigation of earthquake-induced geo-hazard processes that provided information to relief and recovery officials on the same timeframe as those operations were occurring.

Charities and Crowdfunding platforms received over $230 million in donations from support groups. The money was used to provide medical supplies, for reconstruction of damaged buildings including schools and hospitals, and building orphanages for the victims among other things.

== Repair and reconstruction ==
=== Monuments ===
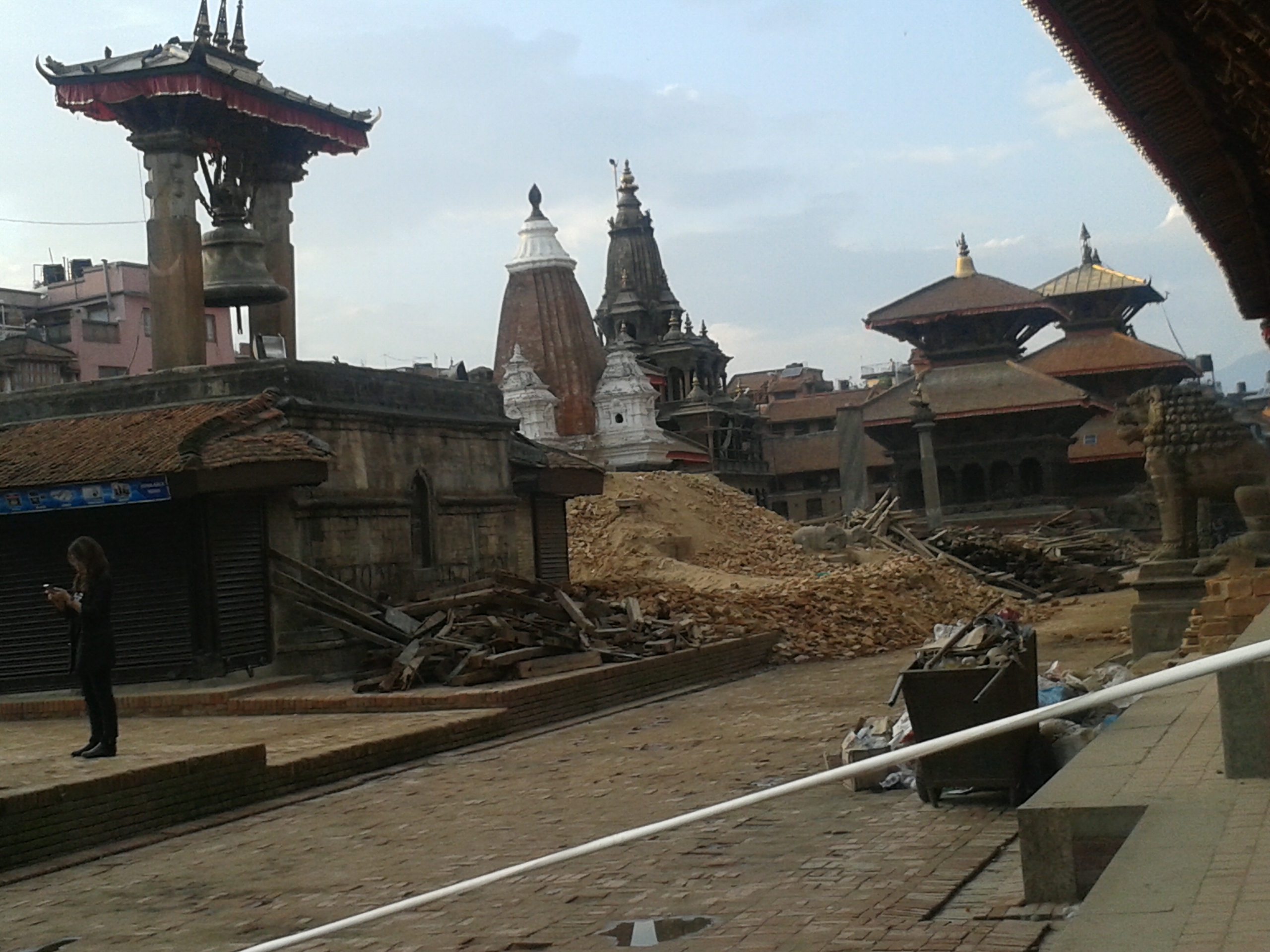
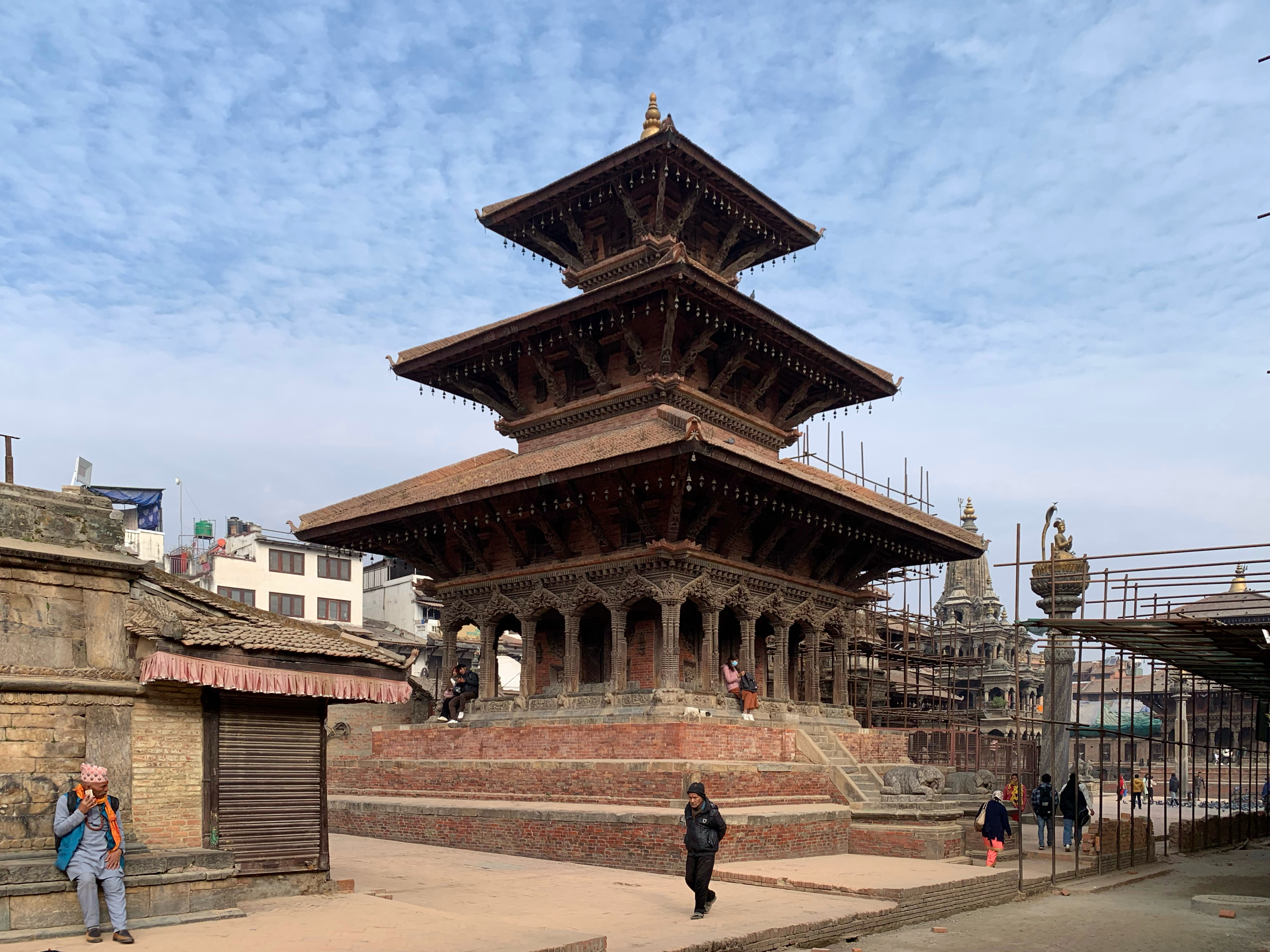
Patan Durbar Square's Hari Shankar Temple completely collapsed after 2015 earthquake (left), and after its full restoration; pictured in 2023 (right)

UNESCO and the Ministry of Culture began strengthening damaged monuments in danger of collapsing before the monsoon season. Subsequent restoration of collapsed structures, including historic houses is planned. Architectural drawings exist that provide plans for reconstruction. According to UNESCO, more than 30 monuments in the Kathmandu Valley collapsed in the quakes, and another 120 incurred partial damage. Repair estimates are $160 million to restore 1,000 damaged and destroyed monasteries, temples, historic houses, and shrines across the country. The destruction is concentrated in the Kathmandu Valley. UNESCO designated seven groups of multi-ethnic monuments clustered in the valley as a single World Heritage Site, including Swayambhu, the three squares namely Durbar square of Kathmandu, Patan Durbar Square, and Bhaktapur Durbar Square, and the Hindu temples of Pashupatinath and Changu Narayan. Out of them only three were damaged in the quakes—three Durbar squares, the temple of Changu Narayan, and the 1655 temple in Sankhu. Drones fly above cultural heritage sites to provide 3D images of the damage to use for planning repairs.

=== Nepal Rural Housing Reconstruction Program ===
After an international donors conference held in Kathmandu on 25 June 2015 a multi donor trust fund of US$4.4 billion was established to aid the reconstruction of affected housing in 14 districts of Nepal. This covered 66 per cent of the country's total recovery and reconstruction needs of US$6.7 billion. Implementation of the Program consisted of five phases i.e. Survey, Identification and Validation, Enrollment, Reconstruction and Completion. The data collection for the program was done digitally using tablets and resulted in collection of over 10 TB of data. The data was openly released to the public by the National Planning Commission and is available for download on their website.

== International aid ==
A total of $3bn was pledged by donors to help rebuild Nepal. UNICEF said close to 1.7 million children had been driven out into the open, and were in desperate need of drinking water, psychological counsel, temporary shelters, sanitation and protection from disease outbreak. It distributed water, tents, hygiene kits, water purification tablets and buckets. Numerous other organizations provided similar support.

India was the first to respond within hours, being Nepal's immediate neighbour, with Operation Maitri which provided rescue and relief by its armed forces. It also evacuated its own and other countries' stranded nationals. India has been the largest aid donor to Nepal following the earthquake with a billion dollar support apart from other non-monetary reliefs extended. China, the Asian Development Bank and the United Kingdom provided significant bilateral aid and other nations and organisations provided aid, rescue teams and helicopters as requested by the Nepalese government.

On 26 April 2015, international aid agencies and governments mobilized rescue workers and aid for the earthquake. They faced challenges in both getting assistance to Nepal and ferrying people to remote areas as the country had few helicopters. Relief efforts were also hampered by Nepalese government insistence on routing aid through the Prime Minister's Disaster Relief Fund and its National Emergency Operation Center. After concerns were raised, it was clarified that "Non-profits" or NGOs already in the country could continue receiving aid directly and bypass the official fund. Aid mismatch and supply of "leftovers" by donors, aid diversion in Nepal, mistrust over control of the distribution of funds and supplies, congestion and customs delays at Kathmandu's airport and border check posts were also reported. On 3 May 2015, restrictions were placed on heavy aircraft flying in aid supplies after new cracks were noticed on the runway at the Tribhuvan International Airport, Nepal's only airport able to handle larger jet aircraft.

The list below gives a break-up of pledged donations, by each nation, along with aid in kind, delivered immediately.

Summary of international aid to Nepal for earthquake relief (See details in the Humanitarian response to the 2015 Nepal earthquake article)
Aid agency / country	Cash donation (US $)	Humanitarian aid and supplies	Other aid	Source
International Federation of Red Cross and Red Crescent Societies	$535,664.55 emergency fund activated	Volunteers (first-aid, search-&-rescue)	Blood-bank supplies to areas in the capital	
Médecins Sans Frontières (Doctors Without Borders)		Rapid intervention surgical kit with 11-member team left Kathmandu for Gorkha (200 km north-west) (61 staff deployed)	Water and sanitation – makeshift camps – Tudikhel (Kathmandu), Bhaktapur (14 km east of Kathmandu), first-aid material to Bhaktapur hospital	
European Union	$3.3 million	Aid, first-response teams and civil-protection experts		
Algeria	$1 million	70 relief workers, medicines, and other supplies		
Australia	$15.86 million	• $3,568,500 to the United Nations relief effort, $793,000 to the World Health Organization, $793,000 to the Australian Red Cross, $396,500 to the RedR Australia relief organisation, $3.172 million for other Australian NGOs. • Two Boeing C-17 aircraft carrying 15 tons of Australian aid and two RAAF aero medical evacuation teams. • The Government of Tasmania donated $7,930 to Rotary Tasmania's Nepal Earthquake Appeal.	• 2 humanitarian experts and a crisis-response team initially. • 70 defence personnel, immigration and other federal government officials to distribute aid and help with evacuation efforts.	
Austria	$835,000		Austrian Red Cross search-&-rescue staff	
Azerbaijan		1 ton of medical supplies, tents, blankets and water (Ministry of Emergency Situations)		
Bangladesh		• BAF Lockheed C-130B aircraft with 10 tonnes of relief materials – tents, dry food, water, blankets, etc. • Four cargo trucks carrying approximately 25 tonnes of essential relief materials for earthquake victims in Nepal left Dhaka. The cargoes will travel through Banglabandh-Fulbari-Panitanki-Kakarbhitta land route. The relief materials include 3000 cartons (12 tonne) of dry food and fruit juice donated by PRAN, and 5000 pieces of blankets donated by Brac, according to a press release of the Embassy of Nepal in Bangladesh. • Bangladesh will provide at least one hundred thousand tons of rice and other relief materials including drinking water to help the earthquake victims in Nepal.	A 34-member team (6 military medical teams and foreign ministry officials). Stranded Bangladeshis airlifted.	
Belgium	$5.5 million		Search-&-rescue teams	
Bhutan	$1 million		63 personnel medical team	
Brunei			8-man relief team (2 doctors, 4 paramedics from the Royal Brunei Armed Forces (RBAF) and Brunei's Gurkha Reserve Unit (GRU)	
Canada	$4.16 million; $832,000 to the Canadian Red Cross	A Boeing C-17 with supplies – blankets, jerry-cans, kitchen sets, hygiene kits, and tarps	150 Canadian troops; a Disaster Assistance Response Team – 30 experts; pledges by humanitarian organizations; immigration assistance	
China	$483 million	Tents, blankets, and generators; emergency response for citizens	China International Search and Rescue Team (CISAR) – 62 members and six search-and-rescue dogs	
Colombia	Fundraising by the Colombian Red Cross	Over 1,500 volunteers from national societies.	Evacuation of citizens and aid (when needed)	
Czech Republic	$791,378	Blankets, medical supplies, water and food; and a special trauma team – transported with a Boeing 737	36 medical workers and 13 firefighters. Evacuated 54 Czechs and 48 EU citizens.	
Denmark	$744,000		Aid (TBD)	
Estonia	Fundraising		15 rescue workers and medics (could not land – airport congestion)	
Finland	$3.35 million; fundraising by the Finnish Red Cross	Medical and logistical supplies	A Finnish Red Cross relief workers team	
France		Equipment and supplies	Crisis centre at Foreign Ministry; a reinforcement team in New Delhi; 11 rescuers, (more help if needed)	
Germany	$68.34 million (€60 million), donated by the public	A mobile medical centre	52 relief workers team – physicians, searchers, dog squads; the German Federal Agency for Technical Relief (THW)'s Rapid Deployment Unit Water and Sanitation Abroad (SEEWA)	
Greece			Search-&-rescue teams	
Haiti	$1 million			
Hong Kong	$6.45 million	World Vision Hong Kong raised $1.29 million to provide victims with tents, tarpaulins, solar-powered lights, and other necessities.		
Hungary	$1 million (HUF 300 million)			
India	$1 billion by the government	Material aid in Operation Maitri: • 8 tons of baby food • Over 100 tons of medical supplies • 75,000 vials of insulin • Over 200 tons of water • 100,000 bottles of water every day from the Indian Railways • Hundreds of tons of food and dry rations • 43 tons of relief material • 10 tons of blankets • Several tons of stretchers, tents • A reverse osmosis (RO) plant • Oxygen regenerators & cylinders • 345 tons of relief material, dry food and essential medicines from the state governments of Bihar and Uttar Pradesh	Rescue aid: • 16 National Disaster Response Force teams, over 1,000 personnel, search-&-rescue dogs • Hundreds of retired Indian Gorkha soldiers of the Indian Army • Hundreds of Indian Army and Indian Air Force personnel • Military task forces headquartered in Kathmandu and Barpak • Relief sorties by Ilyushin Il-76, C-130J Hercules, C-17 Globemaster, Antonov An-32 aircraft • Civilian aircraft • Helicopters – Mi-17, Cheetah, HAL Dhruv ALH • Unmanned Aerial Vehicles (UAVs) • 18 member medical team • 3 field hospitals • 2 mobile teams of specialist doctors • 41 member medical team from the state of Rajasthan • Indian Air Force rapid action medical team • 45 bed hospital at Lagankhel • Light vehicles • Earth moving equipment • 18 Indian Army Engineer Task Forces (Indian Army Corps of Engineers) • Indian Oil Corporation team • PowerGrid Corporation of India engineers • 36+ vehicles – ambulances and water tankers – from the Sashastra Seema Bal • 39 member Indian Army team deployed at the Everest Base Camp to search for, rescue and assist climbers Evacuation of over 20,000 Indian citizens and hundreds of foreign nationals by air and road	
Indonesia	$2 million	2 Boeing 737-400s belonging to the Indonesian Armed Forces and Garuda Indonesia, flew with 6 tons of relief supplies – blankets, body bags, food, water hospital and sleeping tents, medical equipment: and medicines	66 personnel of SAR and Medical team	
Iran		An 80,000 pounds (36,000 kg) relief package (via India)		
Ireland	$1.126 million			
Israel		Three IAF Hercules and two El Al Boeing 747-400 jets carrying a joint IDF and MFA search-&-rescue team and 95 tons of equipment including a field hospital (with premature-babies ward), cutters, electronic sniffers, generators, and lighting equipment. The planes were also used for evacuation.	264 person search-&-rescue team, including physicians.	
Italy	$326,000			
Japan	$8.4 million	Emergency relief supplies worth US$210,000	70 experts – Foreign Ministry, the National Police Agency, and JICA, along with rescuers, search-&-rescue dog handlers, communication specialists, physicians, and field coordinators	
Macau	$2 million	MGM Macau donated $60,000 to the Macau Red Cross for the ongoing earthquake relief effort in Nepal		
Malaysia			20 doctors – Mercy Malaysia and Malaysian Red Crescent; 30-man rescue team – Special Malaysia Disaster Assistance and Rescue Team (SMART)	
Maldives		Other aid (TBA)		
Mexico			Earthquake rescue brigade and engineers.	
Monaco		Other aid (TBA)		
Netherlands	$4.45 million by the government and $25.394.275,18 raised by GIRO 555 Action ('Netherlands helps Nepal')	5 tons of relief supplies	62-man and 8-dog team; several physicians, nurses, and engineers	
New Zealand	$771,000 in humanitarian aid		45 urban search and rescue technicians, 2 aid workers and an engineer.	
Norway	$31.1 million (as of 25 May 2015). Including: $17.3 million (Norwegian government) and $13.8 million in donations to Norwegian aid organizations through aid concerts and donations from the Norwegian public.		Deployed NORSAR Search and Rescue team, consisting of search dogs, emergency medical personnel and firefighters and equipment and aid of 15.3 tonnes. Transported with the help of a Boeing 737-800 of Norwegian Air Shuttle.	
Pakistan		•Four Lockheed C-130 planes •30-bed hospital •2,000 military meals •600 blankets •200 tents other assorted relief items	Military emergency personnel including army doctors, medical staff, and the combined ERRA-NDMA's special search and rescue teams with sniffer dogs	
Philippines			Soldiers, Philippine Red Cross staff, the Metropolitan Manila Development Authority Humanitarian Assistance Team and volunteers	
Poland		15 tons of humanitarian aid, including food, medicines, clothes, water purification tablets, etc., donated by the Republic of Poland and various Polish charitable organizations.	81 firefighters of the State Fire Service, 12 search and rescue dogs, and 6 doctors of the Polish Center for International Aid	
Portugal	$200,000 (€160,000)			
Qatar		2 aircraft with 60 tons of relief materials, such as food, medicines, power generators, and tents; 2 additional aircraft with 120 tons of relief materials, in addition to a field hospital provided by Qatari Red Crescent	Aid operations	
Russia		Two Ilyushin Il-76 airplanes with 'a team of 90 rescuers and rescue equipment,' and 'a batch of humanitarian aid of food products and articles of daily necessity.'	50 highly skilled rescue workers	
Saudi Arabia		The Kingdom has sent 190 tons of aid to earthquake-hit Nepal, which includes food, tents and medical supplies, according to the International Federation of the Red Cross and Red Crescent Societies. The Kingdom also sent medical workers.		
Singapore	$100,000		60 members of the Singapore Civil Defence Force; officers from Singapore's police forces, including the Gurkha Contingent; another relief team	.
Slovakia	$33,000			
Slovenia	$55,000			
South Africa			A search and rescue team composed of members of the South African Police Service with police dogs to aid in the rescue operation.	
South Korea	$1 million	Sindhupalchok area • 1000 tents • Food packages for 230 families (Rice 10 kg, bean 1 kg, salt 1 kg, oil, Nepal noodle 1 kg, 10 vitamin tablets etc. per a package) • 2.4 tons of rice, 320 bottles of vegetable oil, salts for 740 villagers	42 search and rescue workers including 15 medics and two assistants. Two sniffer dogs.	
Spain		30 tons of humanitarian aid, including more than 3,200 blankets, 1680 awnings and 500 kitchen sets, donated in part by Spanish Red Cross.	47 soldiers of the Military Emergencies Unit and seven agents of the Civil Guard, with 60 tons of material, in order to find Spanish citizens unlocated.	
Sri Lanka		SLAF C-130 Hercules flight and SriLankan Airlines Airbus A330 flight with 17 tonnes of medicine, engineering, signal and ordnance equipment, supportive transport requirements, water bottles, health accessories, dry rations, and water purification tablets, etc.	Groups of specialist physicians, other medical staff, and medicine; 44 Sri Lanka Armed Forces personnel and 4 medical consultants; a team of 156 persons, including 11 airmen, 4 medical consultants, and 14 sailors; 97 service personnel: 72 Sri Lanka Army personnel, 14 Sri Lanka Navy personnel, 11 Sri Lanka Air Force personnel	
Sweden	$1.5 million		40 support personnel: ICT, coordination, assessment, camp technicians, structural engineer	
Switzerland	$26.7 million (fundraising)	38 tonnes of relief supplies	Experts, including a physician, a building surveyor, and a water quality technician	
Taiwan	$300,000		Nepal rejected Taiwan's offer to send search and rescue teams due to "China factor".	
Thailand	$200,000 by government $302,000 by the king $5.56 million by the public		Medics and rescue staff	
Turkey		1,000 tents and 320 food packages.	Up to 96 search and rescue staff	
United Arab Emirates	$1.36 million	Medical and food supplies, purchased from India	88 search and rescue staff	
United Kingdom	$130 million (£83 million), of which $51 million (£33 million) was donated by the government and $79 million (£50 million) was donated by the public	30 tonnes of humanitarian aid and 8 tonnes of equipment	Around 100 search and rescue responders, medical experts, and disaster and rescue experts deployed by the Department for International Development's United Kingdom International Search and Rescue Team; engineers from the British Army's Brigade of Gurkhas; three Chinook helicopters (returned unused by the Nepalese government)	
United States	$10 million by government, the public donates separately through several agencies		A disaster response team from USAID; Urban Search and Rescue Virginia Task Force 1 from Fairfax County, Virginia was deployed to Nepal from the Dover Air Force Base; Los Angeles County's Urban Search and Rescue California Task Force 2; U.S. Army Green Beret soldiers; 900 Marines of the 3rd Marine Expeditionary Brigade; eight C-130s, five helicopters and four V-22 Osprey VTOL aircraft	
Vatican City	$100,000			
Vietnam	$50,000 by government $30,000 by the Vietnam Red Cross		11 rescuers – Vietnam Red Cross	
Approximate Total	US$3 billion			

== See also ==
- Economy of Nepal
- Foreign aid to Nepal
- Geology of the Himalaya
- List of avalanches
- List of earthquakes in 2015
- List of earthquakes in China
- List of earthquakes in India
- List of earthquakes in Nepal
- List of earthquakes in South Asia
- List of people who died climbing Mount Everest
- List of World Heritage Sites in Nepal
- Operation Sahayogi Haat
- Politics of Nepal
