= Archale =

Archale अर्चले
- Village development committee
- Location in Nepal
- Coordinates: 27.77°N 83.85°E
- Country: Nepal
- Zone: Lumbini Zone
- District: Palpa District

Population (1991)
  - Total: 2,373
- Time zone: UTC+5:45 (Nepal Time)

Archale is a village development committee in Palpa District in the Lumbini Zone of southern Nepal. At the time of the 1991 Nepal census it had a population of 2373 people living in 378 individual households.

== 2015 Nepal earthquake ==
The village was affected by an earthquake on 25 April 2015. Reports from the area indicate that the village has been left in ruins after the earthquake. A wedding was taking place in the village when the earthquake occurred. Fifteen of the wedding guests were killed. Twenty-two houses were destroyed. Most of the houses that were destroyed are ill-constructed houses made of mud, brick and stone.
