= 5 Calls =

Website and app for calling U.S. Congresspeople

- Logo of 5 Calls

- Screenshot Screenshot of 5calls.org in July 2025
- Available in: English
- Founded: 2017
- Country of origin: United States
- Area served: United States
- Website: 5calls.org
- Commercial: No
- Current status: Active

5 Calls is an American website and app that helps users call their Congressional representatives and features high-profile issues with corresponding messaging scripts. Created in early 2017 by volunteers, including Nick O'Neill and his wife Rebecca Kaufman, the pair got the idea to create the site shortly after the 2016 United States presidential election.

The app became highly popular during Donald Trump's second administration; during one week in February 2025, about 700,000 calls were made using 5 Calls, and it was one of the most downloaded iPhone apps on certain days after Trump's inauguration. Representative Alexandria Ocasio-Cortez also encouraged people to use the app. According to O'Neill, in the weeks after Trump's inauguration, the most popular topic for users was opposition to initiatives led by Elon Musk that eliminate programs and jobs at federal agencies. Smaller popularity boosts, including an uptick during the Gaza war, have occurred.

Users select an issue, and the site gives them a script to use in a call, as well as background information. The website provides users with the phone numbers of their representatives and senators, as well as other information about them, using the ZIP Codes of users in order to determine who their representatives and senators are. It also asks users if the call was answered, if they left a voicemail, or if they did not make the call, in order to keep data about the impact of the site.

The scripts are one minute long, and the site makes lists of calls that users can make weekly. The scripts provided differ depending on the ZIP Code of the user. 5 Calls also encourages users to spend five minutes every day making calls. The code used by the site is open-sourced. 5 Calls can also be used to call members of the Utah State Legislature.

== See also ==
- Civic technology
- Resistbot
