= Kathmandu Living Labs =

- Established: 2012
- Research type: Applied
- Field of research: Technology, Data, Open Mapping, Civic engagement
- Director: Nama Raj Budhathoki, PhD
- Staff: 20-25
- Location: Kathmandu, Nepal; 27.7340281°N 85.3368273°E
- Website: www.kathmandulivinglabs.org

Kathmandu Living Labs (KLL) is a living lab and nonprofit civic technology company based in Kathmandu, Nepal that primarily works on mobile technology and mapping. KLL focuses on using GPS/GIS technology for humanitarian aims, sometimes referred to as "humanitarian mapping".

== History ==
Open Cities Kathmandu project members, led by Dr. Nama Raj Budhathoki, launched Kathmandu Living Labs in 2013 after the completion of their first project. The initiative started by mapping Kathmandu's road networks, schools and health facilities to prepare for potential future disasters, as Kathmandu is one of the most seismically at-risk cities in the world. Kathmandu Living Labs developed a web portal named WebDRI to upload collected field data regarding schools/colleges and health facilities into OpenStreetMap.

== Work during Nepal Earthquake 2015 ==
KLL came to international attention in the aftermath of the April 2015 Nepal earthquake, during which the group collaborated with the Humanitarian OpenStreetMap Team to rapidly produce free and open maps of the road network and damaged areas surrounding Kathmandu. These map products were then used by humanitarian aid teams on the ground, a process greatly aided by the fact that KLL already had a working relationship with the Red Cross as well as other key aid organizations and government agencies in the region. The Nepal Army used crowd-sourced data of relief needed, which was collected and verified by Kathmandu Living Labs. KLL was also involved in reconstruction efforts where they were responsible for development and played a part in deployment of mobile data collection system for the Nepal Rural Housing Reconstruction Program.

== Mapping for Social Change ==
KLL uses online mapping to address a wide variety of social challenges. Through KLL, a farmer in a remote Nepalese village can integrate his local knowledge of a field or stream with that of an engineer at MIT. Detailed information about a school can be used to influence government policies and actions. This work integrates local knowledge into large-scale civil society efforts.
