= Care Opinion =

British charity

Care Opinion, formerly Patient Opinion, is a non-profit organization founded by Dr. Paul Hodgkin in 2005 which offers patients an opportunity to offer feedback about their experience of health and social care. It is based in Sheffield. There are similar organisations in Australia and Ireland. It changed its name in April 2017.

It is largely, but not exclusively, web based. Organisations which subscribe to the service pay for feedback directed to appropriate places in their organisation. There are no charges to patients. Subscribing organisations are chiefly part of the National Health Service. It is now used by over 90% of NHS trusts and is supported by the Scottish government, which encouraged health boards to engage with the website with £160,000 funding in 2013. In 2022 more than 500 organisations were using Care Opinion.

It offer patients opportunities:

- to give feedback on their health services
- to easily see what others are saying

For health care providers it enables them:

- to hear – and respond to – patient concerns and thank-yous
- to compare their ratings with others

When compared with other feedback mechanisms in the NHS, such as the Friends and Family Test it offers much more detailed information, and the potential for dialogue, as organisations are encouraged to respond to patient stories, take action where necessary, and report back on what was done. About two thirds of stories receive a response. It also has the advantage of being independent. It is seen as much more positive than making formal complaints, by both patients and staff. Francis Fullam, assistant professor of health systems management at Rush University Medical Center, says that his center also shares patient ratings and comments on its website but says the difference about Care Opinion is that not only does it lets patients tell their stories, but it also lets clinicians listen, gain insight, respond, and act. Because the process is transparent the public can see the responses and any changes that result from the interaction.

In 2006, about 1,500 opinions and ratings were posted on the website. In 2011, during the debate about the Health and Social Care Act 2012 the organisation analysed the 11,000 accounts of healthcare experiences posted on the site over the previous five years focused on the most critical postings to find where patients felt the NHS needs to improve. Staff attitudes generated the biggest criticism. Only 3% perceived ‘choice of provider’ as a problem. All Scottish health boards respond to experiences shared on the website and since it was introduced in 2011, more than 100 changes have been made to services across Scotland in response to this feedback including changes to facilities, signage and food services. It has a system of ‘tag bubbles’ which enable searches of the data linked to particular aspects of care. This revealed that patients had high opinions of physiotherapy.

The Irish Society for Quality and Safety in Healthcare is operating a similar website which in its first five weeks received 27 detailed stories.
