= Churiyamai =

Village development committee in Narayani Zone, Nepal

Churiyamai चुरियामाई
- Village development committee
- Location in Nepal
- Coordinates: 27.37°N 85.03°E
- Country: Nepal
- Zone: Narayani Zone
- District: Makwanpur District
- Submetropolitan city: Hetauda

Population (1991)
  - Total: 10,405
- Time zone: UTC+5:45 (Nepal Time)

Churiyamai is a village development committee in the Hetauda Submetropolitan City of Makwanpur District in the Bagmati Province of Nepal. At the time of the 1991 Nepal census it had a population of 10,405 people living in 1843 individual households. There is Churiyamai Secondary School in Ward no. 9. This VDC has Churiyamai Temple, goddess of Churiyamai. The drivers worship this Goddess heartily. The name of the VDC and School is called Churiya hill. Churiya hill is a range of hills across the whole of Nepal. This VDC has 12 schools.
