= Iván Nabalón =

- Born: Óscar Iván Nabalón Barrientos; 19 July 1977 (age 49); Valladolid, Spain
- Citizenship: Spanish
- Occupations: Entrepreneur, investor, philanthropist
- Known for: Founder of Electronic IDentification (eID)

Iván Nabalón (born Óscar Iván Nabalón Barrientos on 19 July 1977) is a Spanish entrepreneur, investor and philanthropist from Valladolid, Spain. His work has encompassed technology businesses in digital identity and projects concerned with employment, education and citizen participation.

His involvement in digital identification began with an online citizen participation project established in 2013. The project required a means of verifying users' identities electronically, and the technology developed for that purpose later formed the basis of Electronic IDentification (eID). The company specialised in remote identity verification and electronic signature services, particularly for financial institutions. The Norwegian company Signicat acquired eID in July 2021.

Nabalón is also president of Fundación Civitana, an organisation whose activities include developing digital identity and citizen participation tools.

== Career ==
Nabalón acquired his knowledge of computing and programming through independent study. He began working in the technology department of Cadbury Schweppes in 1995, initially in Valladolid. His work with the company later took him to Birmingham, United Kingdom.

After leaving Cadbury Schweppes in 2003, he established a technology services consultancy in Madrid. He later sold the business to Cognicase Management Consulting and joined the group as an executive director and member of its management committee.

In 2012, Nabalón published Una visión de futuro de la gestión pública y su relación con el ciudadano (A vision for the future of public management and its relationship with citizens). Published by Vivelibro, the book addresses public management and the relationship between citizens and public administrations, including the role of communication in that relationship.

In April 2013, he incorporated Citizenship Relationship Platform, a company established to develop technology for citizen participation and the evaluation of public management. The company was renamed Civitana later that year.

The citizen participation project incorporated technology intended to identify users remotely. Although its original application was in public participation, that capability attracted interest from financial institutions seeking to provide services without requiring customers to visit a branch. The identification technology developed within Civitana was consequently adapted for financial-sector applications, particularly online customer onboarding.

== Electronic IDentification ==
Civitana changed its corporate name to Electronic IDentification (eID) in April 2016. Under the new name, the company concentrated on remote identification and electronic signatures. Its video-based verification technology allowed users to establish their identity without attending a physical office. The process involved capturing images of an identity document and the user's face, then comparing the facial image with the photograph in the document as part of the verification procedure.

One of eID's banking applications was SelfNow, the digital customer onboarding system introduced by Self Bank in 2016. eID and Everis were technology partners in the project, which incorporated videoconferencing into the procedures used to register new banking customers.

In May 2017, the technology research and consulting firm Gartner included eID in Cool Vendors in Spain, 2017, a report examining emerging technology companies in Spain.

In January 2018, EIT Digital published an account of Electronic ID's video-identification technology and its participation in the organisation's accelerator programme. The initiative was intended to support the company's expansion into other European markets.

The company placed second in the global innovation contest organised by NTT Data in Tokyo in March 2018. Its expansion was also reflected in its banking relationships and international presence. By July 2018, eID was working with approximately 40 financial institutions in Spain and had established offices in Mexico and France. During the same period, it completed a funding round of €2.5 million.

Electronic IDentification appeared in the RegTech100 list for 2019, a selection of companies operating in the regulatory technology sector.

The company was also profiled in a 2020 report on the Iberian financial technology sector prepared at NOVA School of Business and Economics. The report identified Nabalón as its founder, dated the company's origins to 2013 and recorded Madrid as its headquarters.

In July 2021, the Norwegian digital identity company Signicat acquired Electronic IDentification. At the time of the transaction, eID had more than 250 customers across 30 countries, reflecting the international reach of the business at the time of its acquisition.

== Fundación Civitana ==
In 2022, Nabalón co-founded Fundación Coolture4kids with Mónica Pérez Núñez. The foundation was established for cultural, social, scientific and educational purposes. Its original registered aims included facilitating access to cultural activities for children living in poverty, alongside other activities of public interest.

The foundation was formally entered into Spain's Registry of Foundations through a resolution dated 28 September 2023, published in the Boletín Oficial del Estado in November of that year. At the time of registration, Mónica Pérez Núñez was listed as president and Nabalón as a member of its governing board.

In 2026, the foundation adopted the name Fundación Civitana. The change was registered as an amendment to its statutes, together with modifications to the provisions concerning its purposes and activities.

Subsequent accounts identify Nabalón as president of Fundación Civitana. The organisation's activities include developing digital identity and citizen participation tools intended to facilitate interactions between individuals and institutions. Initiatives associated with this work include Civitana.ID, concerned with electronic identification and signatures, and Civify, a platform for citizen participation and collaboration with public institutions.

== Other activities ==
In addition to his work in electronic identification and public participation, Nabalón has been involved in business projects related to employment and education. These include Jobs2live, a platform concerned with recruitment and professional relationships in the technology sector, and SuperSapiens, an educational technology initiative. Accounts of these projects identify him as a co-founder and chief executive of Jobs2live and as a founder of SuperSapiens.

Nabalón is also an investor in Decelera Ventures, an early-stage venture capital fund that operates a programme in Menorca, Spain.

On 19 September 2025, the Consejo Superior de Letrados y Abogados de Comunidades Autónomas organised a conference at Spain's Congress of Deputies. The conference programme listed Nabalón as a participant in a panel on artificial intelligence, representing Civify, a citizen participation platform.

== Publications ==
- Nabalón, Iván (2012). Una visión de futuro de la gestión pública y su relación con el ciudadano. Vivelibro. ISBN 978-84-15519-20-1.
- Nabalón, Iván (2019). "La identificación electrónica: redefiniendo las reglas del sector financiero". Papeles de Economía Española, no. 162, pp. 162–174.
- Nabalón, Iván; Herrera, Diego; Vadillo, Sonia (2021). Onboarding digital. Inter-American Development Bank. doi:10.18235/0003605.
- Identidad digital y Plan de Recuperación: desbloqueando un efecto multiplicador del PIB en España. IE PublicTech Lab, IE University.
