= Code for America Commons =

Project to help reduce government IT costs

- Established: September 2010
- Location: United States
- Website: http://commons.codeforamerica.org/

Code for America Commons is a project by Code for America and OpenPlans focused on reducing government IT costs by helping government entities share code and best practices. It was initially launched as Civic Commons as an independent nonprofit organization, but later became a program of Code for America. The project is a coordinated effort between Code for America, OpenPlans, and the District of Columbia's Office of the Chief Technology Officer (OCTO).

== Projects ==
=== Federal IT Dashboard ===
The Federal IT Dashboard was launched in June 2009 as a government transparency initiative. According to US CIO Vivek Kundra, it was "a website where you could track $80 billion of IT spending annually." Initially it was only available to the federal government, which used the dashboard to monitor project effectiveness and decide the allocation of resources. With help from the Civic Commons initiative, the IT dashboard was made freely available to all government entities in March 2011.

=== Enterprise Addressing System ===
The Enterprise Addressing System (EAS) is a web-based application introduced by the San Francisco Department of Technology to manage the city's master database of addresses. In response to other jurisdictions' expressed interest in EAS, the city of San Francisco decided to open source the system with help from Civic Commons. In early 2011, Farallon Geographics developed a secure solution for EAS using open source geospatial technology.
