= Arena Electoral =

Arena electoral
- Website type: Online Platform
- Headquarters: Mexico City, {{{location_country}}}
- Founder: Fundación Ethos
- Website: http://www.arenaelectoral.com
- Current status: Active

Arena Electoral was an online platform created by Fundación Ethos during the 2012 Mexican general election to help Mexican citizens vote for the presidential candidate they preferred. The platform did this by giving the 2012 presidential candidates certain topics based on the Mexican national agenda and had to come up with a solution. The platform unanimously published the candidates' policies on their website. The goal of the platform was to allow Mexican citizens to vote for the policymaker that shared the same ideas as them, rather than voting for a candidate based on party affiliations or other types of bias.

== Background ==
The software was developed and designed by a much larger organization known as Fundación Ethos and was supported by the United Nations Population Fund and by National Endowment for Democracy (NED) of the United States.

=== Software ===
Its software, Arena Electoral 2.0 was developed and produced under Fundación Ethos.

=== Funding ===
The platform was created by a non-profit, independent, and non-partisan organization that is financed by contributions from individuals and international organizations, along with short contributions.

=== Principles ===
On its webpage, Arena Electoral lists nine main principles which they aimed to follow and keep in order to have remained as neutral as possible.

The first principle was that they were not giving out/selling items.

The second principle is in regards to advertising. Advertisements were on the site of Area Electoral, but it was only used as a necessity to pay for their discrete salaries. They did not accept money or resources from candidates or companies that intended to modify Arena Electoral's political opinions.

In the third principle, the information in which the partners of Arena Electoral decided to share on their platform was posted independently without the intervention of Arena Electoral's team or any other organizations which were partnered with Arena Electoral. Everyone was free to post anything on the site but were responsible for their post.

Arena Electoral's fourth principle titled "APPARATUS" claims that they were 100% nonpartisan and independent of any candidate or party. No member of their team was allowed to participate directly in the campaign of any of the candidates they evaluated on the platform.

Their fifth principles are in regards to conduct.

The sixth principle is in regards to the media. Members of the Arena Electoral who appeared on television to give opinions, were only spokespersons.

The seventh principle is titled "CONFLIICT OF INTERESTS". Any member of the Arena Electoral team who had a husband or wife, boyfriend or girlfriend, partner or a close relationship with a candidate, or member of their team, was known on their personal information.

The eighth principle addressed information on their site. Any opinion which appeared on the platform was the individual's and should not be considered a judgement supported by Arena Electoral.

The ninth and final principle is in regards to the use of Arena Electoral's page. Users of the page were to made good use of the page. Any content posted on their site which contained inappropriate words was removed.

== Mission ==
The main goal of Arena Electoral was to promote responsible voting. They aimed to achieve this by making citizens aware on which candidate was the bestpolicy maker in accordance with their own ideas.

=== Safe-space for Citizens to communicate to each other ===
Arena Electoral aimed to be a platform for people to express and publish their own opinions without having to worry about their party or candidate affiliations.

=== Promote responsible voting ===
In order to promote responsible voting, Arena electoral created a tool within their platform called Votomático. Votomático was a questionnaire containing 25 questions, based on several themess: security and justice; economic development; social development and the environment; human rights and state reform, and foreign policy. The results were anonymous unless the person who took it, chose to share them.

The Votomático questionnaire had five different answerers for each question and was multiple choice. After answering every question, the exercise would show which candidate was closest to those answers. Votomático Arena Electoral aimed to show citizens with which of the four presidential candidates they were more inclined to.

== Topics ==
The presidential candidates received questions based on eleven topics regarding the national agenda. The topics were:

1. Health
2. Education
3. Science and Technology
4. Culture
5. Human rights
6. Economic Development
7. Sustainable Development
8. Social Improvement
9. Security and Justice
10. Foreign Policy
11. State Reforms

After giving their proposals on the topic, the candidates were then evaluated by more than 200 experts including academics from both public and private universities. The evaluators scored the candidates based on their responsibility, viability, feasibility, all while withholding the platform's principles and aspirations.

=== Results ===
The result showed Andrés Manuel López Obrador as the winner with 5.7. Enrique Peña Nieto, came in second with 5.2. Consequently, Josefina Vázquez Mota came in third with 4.4 and with the lowest score came in Gabriel Quadric with 2.8.
