= Transport Direct =

Division of the UK Department for Transport

Transport Direct Logo

Screenshot from the Transport Direct Portal

The Transport Direct Programme was a division of the UK Department for Transport (DfT) to develop standards, data and better information technology systems to support public transport. It developed and operates the Transport Direct Portal which is a public facing multi-modal journey planner. It also supports the creation and management of comprehensive databases of all public transport movements in the United Kingdom with Traveline. During 2010 two key datasets were released as Open Data and published on www.data.gov.uk .

The closure of the portal was announced in September 2014, and the portal closed on 30 September 2014.

== Transport Direct Portal ==
The journey planner was a public-facing multi-modal door-to-door journey planner website for Great Britain which provided options for both public transport and car-based options and included an option for cyclists in some parts of the country.

== Standards ==
A number of data standards were developed to support the collection, transfer and management of the required transport data:-

- CycleNetXChange a UK data protocol for exchanging information about infrastructure to support the development of a national cycle journey planning function within the Transport Direct Portal.
- IFOPT, a CEN standard for defining public transport access information (building on NaPTAN and NPTG).
- JourneyWeb, a protocol to allow the development of a distributed journey planning service (which became the Transport Direct Portal).
- NaPTAN for the exchange of information associated with bus stops, railway station and other public transport access point.
- NPTG for the exchange of information about places and points of interest.
- SIRI, a CEN standard for exchanging real-time public transport information.
- TransXChange, a UK data protocol for the exchange of public transport schedules in conjunction with Vehicle and Operator Services Agency, Arriva and Stagecoach Group

Other organisations involved in this work included Traveline, the Real Time Information Group (RTIG), the Association of Transport Coordinating Officers (ATCO) and the Confederation of Passenger Transport (CPT) as well a number of system suppliers.

== Data resources ==
The development of Transport Direct has created a number of comprehensive national datasets to support the Transport Direct Portal. The assessment of accessibility to services by public transport was made a requirement for the Local Transport Plans in 2004. Measuring the level of accessibility required the use of the data collected by Transport Direct.

This data is being used by an increasing number of 3rd parties, including Google Transit (South East Traveline Region) and East Anglia / East Midlands Traveline Regions. MySociety's Mapumental accessibility product. During 2010 increasing amounts of data has become available as Open Data including NaPTAN and NPTDR.

=== National Public Transport Access Nodes database (NaPTAN) ===
The National Public Transport Access Node (NaPTAN) dataset is a UK nationwide system for uniquely identifying all the points of access to public transport in the UK. The dataset, which is open data contains details of some 360,000 nodes including every UK railway station, bus station (Coach station), airport, ferry terminal, bus stop, taxi rank or other place where public transport can be joined; it also details all public entrances to transport hubs and can contain details of airport gates, railway platforms and ferry berths. Each element is allocated a unique 'NaPTAN identifier'. Each entry is linked with one or more localities in the National Public Transport Gazetteer.

It is updated on data.gov.uk every three months.

The CEN standard (Identification of Fixed Objects In Public Transport or 'IFOPT') integrates many concepts used in the NaPTAN standard into a European standard for stop identification as an extension to Transmodel which is the European standard for Public Transport information.

Elements of the NaPTAN are used in the timetable data provided by the Bus Open Data Service

=== National Public Transport Gazetteer ===
The National Public Transport Gazetteer is a dataset detailing some 50,000 place names for cities, town, villages, hamlets and suburbs in the UK. It is available as open data from data.gov.uk.

=== National Public Transport Data Repository ===
The National Public Transport Data Repository (NPTDR) is a snapshot of all public transport schedules for the UK including bus, tram, train, ferry coach and rail. A dataset is created each year for October and the most recent version is available as open data from data.gov.uk.

It was originally created for use by local authorities and other organisations in the production of accessibility strategies, which was a requirement for Local Transport Plan. The data repository was first set up in 2004, and an annual snapshot of data has been created each year since then. Data is collected for all public transport services running in Great Britain during a full week in October each year. It is supplied by Traveline regions and the Association of Train Operating Companies (ATOC) and processed into files for each local authority, broken down further into files for each transport mode. The data in the repository is in both ATCO.CIF and TransXChange technical formats, rather than in a format that would be readily recognised as a timetable. NPTDR was made available as Open Data in September 2010, with new October 2010 data released in March 2011 (Previously there was a charge made for this dataset).

Datasets available:

- October 2004 dataset
- October 2005 dataset
- October 2006 dataset
- October 2007 dataset
- October 2008 dataset
- October 2009 dataset
- October 2010 dataset

=== National Coach Services Database ===
The National Coach Services Database contains details of all 'limited-stop coach services' in the UK, including those of National Express EasyBus and Scottish Citylink This dataset is not available as open data.

=== National Car Parks Database ===
The National Car Parks dataset contains details of every public car park in the country and also every Park and Ride site. This dataset is not available as open data.

=== National public transport dataset ===
During 2009-10 Traveline has been developing a national dataset covering local transport details for all parts of the UK which will be updated every week (rather than once a year with the NPTDR). It has an associated data sharing agreement defining how it can be used by 3rd parties. The dataset current does not include rail or coach services.

=== Cycle routes database ===
Transport Direct has been contracting companies to survey parts of the UK to provide information to support the cycle journey planning function of the Transport Direct Portal which has been developed in association with Cycling England.

== Open data considerations ==
All the transport schedules were initially closed data covered by Crown copyright.

In March 2009 the Cabinet Office published the 'Power of Information Taskforce Report' which noted that although the National Public Transport Data Repository described itself as 'Crown Copyright' investigation showed that the database was not actually government data and also that there were significant changes for reuse of the NPTDR dataset. The report suggested that there should be a presumption in favour of information which has been created by public sector bodies being available for re-use. It is suggested that there should be a clear and consistent copyright and licensing rules applied making it easy to work with data from multiple sources in the public sector. It recommended the a 'Crown Commons' style approach with "highly permissive licensing scheme that is transparent, easy to understand and easy to use, modeled on the 'Click Use' license" should be developed.

In December 2009 Local Transport Today reported that 'Data release could spark transport IT innovations". The magazine reported that "Among the data to be made accessible through the site are trunk road traffic volumes, the National Public Transport Access Node (NaPTAN) database and the National Public Transport Data Repository (NPTDR)". A DfT spokeswoman was reported to say: "We will seek to embrace new technology to enable partners to provide exciting, user-focused services such as recently seen with satellite navigation and iPhone applications",

In March 2010 the Prime Minister Gordon Brown announced that the NaPTAN dataset was to be immediately made available from the data.gov.uk site as Open Data, as well as confirming an impending release of Ordnance Survey data. In his speech he observed that at present public transport timetables and real-time running information was owned by the operating companies but that the government would work to free it up. He also said that "from today we will make it a condition of future franchises that this data will be made freely available".

NPTDR was made available as Open Data in September 2010.

== Costs ==
The costs of operating Transport Direct and creating the associated portal are funded by central Government. The data used by the portal is created and maintained by a range of other organisations. Work commissioned by the Department in 2000 indicated that the services that Transport Direct seeks to deliver would not be provided by the private sector.

The cost of the Transport Direct Programme (Portal and other necessary works) from April 2003 to March 2006 was £45 million up for the period April 2003 to March 2006 until then £10 million for the period April 2006 to March 2007. The Portal itself cost £5.9 million for the period April 2006 to March 2007. The 10 millionth user session took place on 1 December 2006 with the number of session steadily growing over time; 1.126 million user sessions were recorded for August 2007.

A Freedom of Information request was made on 4 January 2006 that requested details of the cost of the development of the Transport Direct portal.

== History ==
=== Context ===
Bus deregulation in Great Britain in 1985 allowed operators to determine routes and frequencies (except in London) which were normally prepared by hand and few transport authorities had databases giving the name and locations of bus stops, and where they did they were in a locally developer format. Bus operators were required register their schedules with VOSA which they did on paper at timing point level together with a prose description of the route. An additional problem was that a single bus stop could be served by multiple bus operators who would typically use different names for the same bus stop. The Bus wars in the early period of deregulation added to the confusion and printer timetables at bus stops largely disappeared as bus companies cut costs.

In 1986 during the conservative government the M25 motorway was opened by Margaret Thatcher and then in 1989 a white paper titled "Roads for Prosperity" was published which was heralded as 'the biggest road building program since the Romans'. Within a few years however, the M25 was carrying far more traffic than was predicted and plans were drawn up to widen the entire motorway. Other road schemes, including the M3 motorway at Twyford Down, the M11 link road, the Newbury bypass etc. were met with unprecedented levels of opposition which led to a review of transport policy starting in the mid-1990s. Steven Norris, later to become a strong advocate of cycling and public transport, was appointed as Under-Secretary of State for Transport in 1992 and in 1994 a new revised edition of Planning Policy Guidance 13 acknowledged officially for the first time that new roads lead to additional traffic making new roads much harder to justify; in July the Secretary of State for Transport Brian Mawhinney launched what he termed a 'Great Debate' over about the future direction for transport in the UK; and then in October a major Royal Commission report, Transport and the Environment was published which highlighted the serious environmental consequences of UK's car-based transport system. By the end of 1995 many road schemes had been canceled and the incoming Labour government following the 1997 general election canceled many of the remaining schemes.

Under New Labour, John Prescott, the Secretary of State for the Environment, Transport and the Regions wanted to an increased role for public transport; Labour's first transport white paper "A New Deal for Transport: Better for everyone" was published in 1998 which included a commitment to create a national multi-modal transport information system by the end of 2000. A subsequent White Paper, the 'Transport Ten Year Plan 2000' provided more details of the required work. The project would:- "Stimulate the transport sector to develop high quality information systems", "Enable users to find all available electronic travel information", "Develop integrated information and ticket sales for journeys involving more than one mode of transport" and "Deliver an integrated and comprehensive information service for all travel modes and mode combinations, which was implemented as the Transport Direct Portal."

=== Development ===
Given the capabilities of the computers at the time it was not considered feasible at the time to operate a national journey planner, so a regional approach was chosen. The Confederation of Passenger Transport agreed to set up Traveline in 2000 which would include representatives from local government and from the transport operators. Traveline then organised itself into a regional structure, each of which would develop systems for providing information from telephone call centres in time over the internet. Initially paper timetables were used while the necessary information systems and supporting datasets were developed. A basic file format for the exchange of transport schedules was available and was updated in 2000 to accommodate some of the requirements of the new project. A contract to develop the Transport Direct Portal was awarded in 2002 to Atos Origin which would provide a single access point to the journey planners being developed by each of the Traveline regions. A specification for the National Public Transport Access Nodes (NaPTAN) database, which would hold the details of every station, coach terminus, airport, ferry terminal, bus stop, etc. in Great Britain was published in December 2002 together with the associated NPTG standard was also defined and was populated with 50,000 commonly used place names and major points of interest. A GPS survey of the country was carried out to populate the new database. On completion the NaPTAN database detailed 360,000 Stop Points. Also in 2002 Transport Direct also managed a program for the Department for Transport to invest £20m into real-time Passenger information system to 19 local authorities in the UK to increase the uptake of this technology which was already being developed in a number of places.

An initial specification for a new more comprehensive standard for the exchange of public transport data ( TransXChange) was completed in 2003 although much of the schedule data was still transferred using a simpler 'ATCO CIF' file format. Data for the portal was collected from some 200 organisations. A data standard for the exchange of real time public transport information was completed in 2003. RTIG-XML, a data standard for the exchange of real time public transport information was completed in 2003. A prototype national door-to-door journey for Great Britain (i.e. UK without Northern Ireland) was available by November 2003 to 'stakeholders and key opinion formers' and was officially launched by Alistair Darling, the Secretary of State for Transport on 31 December 2004. The integration of public transport and car journey planning on this scale was claimed as a world-first. To put the project in perspective, it was launched prior to the existence of Google Maps (early in 2005) and routing of public transport on Google Maps was not released until December 2005 and this service required a feed of data of the type being collected by Transport Direct.

=== Operation ===
From 2004 Transport Direct has operated the Transport Direct Portal in using the Traveline regional planners from which it is constructed.

During 2005 Transport Direct was re-organised into three service areas to:

- Provide travel information services directly to users through the Transport Direct Portal;
- Provide travel information services through valued-adding third parties such as the BBC, Google, Directgov(provided by Transport Direct, National Rail Enquiries, Visit Britain and the UK Department for Work and Pensions;
- Work with and orchestrate the travel and transport information communities within the UK, Europe and internationally to promote the use of standards and common processes to deliver an effective transport information supply chain.

A database of public transport schedules (known as 'National Public Transport Data Repository' or NPTDR) was first assembled in 2004 covering a week in October. This data could be used with the 'Accession' software, developed with funding from the Department for Transport for analysis accessibility to services which was a requirement for the Local Transport Plans in development at the time by every Transport Authority. A similar dataset has been collected every subsequent year.

Information was made available from the portal through additional channels during the year, including PDAs, mobile phones and via interactive television via BSkyB, cable and Freeview set-top boxes with a modem or broadband connection.

In 2006 Transport Direct started FareXChange, a technical standard for the exchange of information about public transport fares. Also in 2006 the Service Interface for Real Time Information (SIRI), which was developed with support from Transport Direct was adopted as a CEN standard.

In 2007 data for buses and coaches in the South East England Traveline Region was made available to Google Transit. This did not however include the rail information which is available through Transport Direct but for which 3rd parties are required to deal directly with Network Rail or for London (which is only available to 3rd parties from Transport for London).

In November 2008 the final (version 1.0) draft of Identification of Fixed Objects In Public Transport (IFOPT), a CEN standard for describing public transport interchanges was completed. In December 2008 the Department released NaPTAN data for use in OpenStreetMap and after an import process was defined the first a data for many places including London had been imported by August 2009.

In March 2009 Transport Direct added cycle journey planning to the Portal for Manchester and Merseyside. CycleStreets, a national cycle journey planner using OpenStreetMap data was launched as beta in the same month.

In June 2009 MySociety launched a beta version of Mapumental which shows travel time by different modes of public transport within a time limit for anywhere in Great Britain using the NPTDR dataset.

In July 2009 Cycling England (funded by the Department for Transport) 'urged' local authorities across England to help develop a cycle journey planner for the Government's Transport Direct website and offered matched funding for the cost of collecting the data.

In November 2009 data for the East Anglia and East Midlands Traveline Regions were made available to Google Transit. Again, only bus and coach information is available through Google.

In January 2010 Cycle City Guides were contracted to survey further cycle routes with an eventual aim of providing coverage for every urban area in England with a population over 30,000.

In March 2010 the NaPTAN dataset was made available as Open Data from data.gov.uk. In the same month Google Maps launched a cycling routing function for 150 cities in the United States. Google also announced that it had made Google Streetview available for virtually every road in the United Kingdom.

In September 2010 the National Public Transport Data Repository was made available on data.gov.uk as Open Data. Transport for London made their current public transport schedules available to same month from the London datastore.
