= CycleNetXChange =

Standard format with which to exchange cycle path data

CycleNetXChange provides a standard format with which to exchange cycle path data, together with information about the quality of routes; This enables computerised transport systems to provide cycle routes.

This UK National Cycle Path network schema (CycleNetXChange) defines an exchange format for an exchange of cycle path data together with information relevant to cycling about the quality of routes; . It is a component of the UK national transport information infrastructure and is based on a number of other UK and ISO standards.

The format allows cycle path data to be collected by different communities and exchanged to provide cycle Journey planners and other navigation products.

The CycleNetXChange schema is in draft and is intended to become a UK national de facto standard sponsored by the UK Department of Transport. CycleNet is based on the Ordnance Survey DNF (Digital National Framework) for referencing objects and the ITN (Integrated Transport Network) schema and can be used in conjunction with road and map data that conforms to the DNF.

The standard has been developed by Transport Direct to enable the delivery with Cycling England of as the National Cycle Journey Planner element of the Transport Direct Portal.

== Working party ==
The following people contributed to the development of the standard:

- Kevin Bossley: Wherefromhere
- Colin Henderson: Ordnance Survey
- David Kirton: Camden Consultancy Services
- Peter Miller: ITO World
- Nick Knowles: Kizoom
- Simon Nuttall: CycleStreets
- Richard Shaw: WS Atkins
- Jonathan Shewell Cooper: Atos Origin
- Shane Snow, Department for Transport

== See also ==
- NaPTAN
- GovTalk
- TransXChange
