= Traveline =

British public transport route planner service

- Founded: 2000
- Website: traveline.info

Traveline is a public transport route planner service provided by a partnership between local authorities and transport operators in the UK to provide impartial and comprehensive information about public transport, which has operated since 2000. It prepares comprehensive public transport data for the UK and provides a number of regional public transport journey planners.

== History ==
Following on from a successful prototype one-number travel service developed by Lancashire County Council in 1999, the national Traveline organisation was established in 2000.

A prototype national door-to-door journey for Great Britain (i.e.,. the UK without Northern Ireland) the Lancashire Traveline model for regional journey planners, was available for evaluation by 'stakeholders and key opinion formers' by November 2003, and the service was officially launched by Secretary of State for Transport Alistair Darling on 31 December 2004.

In March 2010, Prime Minister Gordon Brown announced that the NaPTAN dataset would be released as Open Data.

== Operation ==
The Traveline regions assemble the public transport information within their areas and make it available through a number of local public transport journey planners. As of May 2014, all regions provide information for use within the Google Maps journey planner, and as of December 2016 all regions were added to the Apple Maps journey planner.

Regional	Journey planner	Notes
East Anglia	Formerly MDV (site now closed)	
East Midlands	MDV	Formerly MDV (site now closed)
London	MDV	Transport for London also operates its own MDV system
North East & Cumbria	JourneyPlan	
North West	Trapeze	
Scotland	Trapeze	
South East	Formerly MDV (site now closed)	
South West	MDV	Formerly MDV (site now closed)
Wales	Trapeze	
West Midlands	MDV	Formerly MDV (site now closed)
Yorkshire	Trapeze	

Details of all bus stops in the country are assembled into the National Public Transport Access Nodes database (NaPTAN) which is updated daily. The organisation also maintains the associated National Public Transport Gazetteer of all place names, both formal and informal, that may be used to indicate the destination for a requested journey. These datasets are provided to both Google Maps and OpenStreetMap. They have also been released as Open Data via data.gov.uk.

Public transport schedules were provided for use with the Transport Direct Portal on a weekly basis for use within the 'national journey planner for Great Britain' until this portal was closed in September 2014.

Once a year, all the schedules for the county by all modes (including the information collected and maintained by Traveline) is assembled into the National Public Transport Data Repository which is prepared every October is used for the creation of Core Accessibility Indicators for every part of the UK. This data is also used within products such as MySociety's Mapumental.

Some bus operators provide information via the Electronic Bus Service Registration system using the TransXChange when passing information between operators, the Vehicle & Operator Services Agency and Traveline.

== Organisational structure ==
For operational and data preparation purposes the UK is divided in the following regions/nations: The boundaries are not identical to the Regions of England.

Name	Members	Notes
Cymru/Wales		
East Anglia	Cambridgeshire, Norfolk and Suffolk	
East Midlands	Derby, Derbyshire, Leicester, Leicestershire, Lincolnshire, Northamptonshire, North East Lincolnshire, North Lincolnshire, Nottingham, Nottinghamshire, Peterborough, Rutland	
London	Transport for London	
North East & Cumbria	Cumbria, Darlington, Durham, Hartlepool, Middlesbrough, Northumberland, Redcar and Cleveland, Stockton-on-Tees, Tyne and Wear	
Northern Ireland		
North West	Blackburn with Darwen, Blackpool, Cheshire East, Cheshire West and Chester, Greater Manchester, Halton, Lancashire, Merseyside, Warrington	
Scotland		
South East (excluding London)	Bedford, Bracknell Forest, Brighton and Hove, Buckinghamshire, Central Bedfordshire, East Sussex, Essex, Hertfordshire, Isle of Wight, Kent, Luton, Medway, Milton Keynes, Oxfordshire, Reading, Slough, Southend-on-Sea, Surrey, Thurrock, West Berkshire, West Sussex, Windsor & Maidenhead and Wokingham	
South West	Bath and North East Somerset, Bournemouth, Bristol, Cornwall and Isles of Scilly, Devon, Dorset, Gloucestershire, Hampshire, North Somerset, Plymouth, Poole, Portsmouth, Somerset, Southampton, South Gloucestershire, Swindon, Torbay and Wiltshire	
West Midlands	Herefordshire, Shropshire, Staffordshire, Stoke-on-Trent, Telford and Wrekin, Warwickshire, West Midlands and Worcestershire	
Yorkshire	East Riding of Yorkshire, Kingston upon Hull, North Yorkshire, South Yorkshire, West Yorkshire and York	

=== Advisory body ===
The advisory body of the national organisation consists of the following organisations:-

- Confederation of Passenger Transport
- Rail Delivery Group
- Local Government Association
- Confederation of Scottish Local Authorities
- Transport for London
- Passenger Transport Executives Group
- Association of Transport Coordinating Officers
- Welsh Government
- Scottish Government
- Department for Transport
- Translink
