= Electronic Bus Service Registration =

British digital registration for bus services

The Electronic Bus Service Registration (EBSR) is a digital system implemented in the United Kingdom to facilitate the registration of local bus services with the Traffic Commissioners for Great Britain. It aims to modernize the bus registration process by replacing traditional paper-based methods with an electronic platform, thereby improving efficiency and data accuracy.

== Overview ==
EBSR was introduced to streamline the process of registering local bus services, enabling operators to submit their service details electronically. This system utilizes the TransXChange (TXC) data format, an XML-based standard for representing bus timetable and route information. By adopting EBSR, the UK government sought to reduce administrative burdens, enhance data consistency, and support the development of integrated transport networks.

== Implementation and Usage ==
The EBSR system allows bus operators to register services online, providing essential information such as route descriptions, timetables, and maps. As of March 2025 approximately 20% of bus service registrations are submitted electronically through EBSR, with the remaining submissions made via traditional paper forms.

To register a service, operators must hold a valid Public Service Vehicle (PSV) operator’s licence or a Section 22 community bus permit. The registration process involves submitting the PSV350 form, which details the service's particulars, including route and timetable information.

== Benefits ==
The adoption of EBSR offers several advantages:

- Efficiency: Speeds up the registration process by reducing manual data entry and paperwork.
- Data Accuracy: Minimizes errors associated with manual transcription.
- Integration: Facilitates the use of bus data in journey planning tools, real-time information systems, and open data platforms like the Bus Open Data Service.
- Compliance: Ensures that bus services meet regulatory requirements set by the Department for Transport.

== Challenges and Limitations ==
Despite its benefits, the uptake of EBSR has been gradual. Some operators have faced challenges in transitioning from paper-based systems to electronic submissions. Additionally, the effectiveness of EBSR is contingent on the quality and completeness of the data provided by operators.

== See also ==
- TransXChange
- Bus Open Data Service
- NaPTAN
