= Intalink =

Transport organisation in Hertfordshire, England

- Map of Hertfordshire
- Type: County council organisation
- Location: Hertford, United Kingdom
- Region served: Hertfordshire
- Services: Public transportation
- Owner: Hertfordshire County Council
- Website: www.intalink.org.uk

Intalink is the organisation responsible for organising the management of public transport services, such as buses and trains, in Hertfordshire on behalf of Hertfordshire County Council. They design, create and promote cross-operator multi-journey tickets and occasionally run competitions. They manage Quality Bus Partnerships maintaining good standards along routes that need it. Along with this, they provide printed timetables, maps and leaflets promoting the above services.

== Intalink Strategy ==
On behalf of the county council, Intalink have a number of responsibilities and duties in a wide variety of areas. These involve making sure that the public is aware of the Intalink brand and the services provided. They also seek to reduce congestion and emissions through the use of careful planning with operators. They also believe that social exclusion, accessibility, travel plans and mode share (where people share a mode of transport, such as taxis or cars) are important factors in Hertfordshire. They aim to demonstrate the advantages of public transport to users, communities, local authorities, businesses, leisure and health and new members that could wish to join the Intalink community. They aim to keep the public transport in Hertfordshire to a high standard in conjunction with local operators.

They also have a number of specific aims, such as persuading operators to submit bus registrations and service change notifications to the council using new Electronic Bus Service Registration techniques, making sure operators do not make an excessive number of changes within a short period of time to maintain stability and to make sure operators keep a high standard of service running.

== Publications ==
As part of their duties Intalink release a number of publications. Many of these are available on the website organised into specific categories. The publications include:

- Area Travel Guides (showing timetables and maps of train and bus services). These are divided into 7 main areas of Hertfordshire.
- A County map (showing all bus and train services in Hertfordshire, except for school services).
- Intalink Intachange magazines, published bi-monthly, providing news, information of service changes and ticket offer updates.
- Leaflets showing information about contracted services (such as the S services around St Albans)
- Bus stop timetables, where operators do not provide their own.

They have a website providing information about the services they provide. There are short films promoting public transport and information on the ticket offers available. There are also links to the timetables, maps, how to find the nearest bus stop and how to plan journeys using Traveline.

In addition to the above, they also have a Twitter account detailing any service updates or changes in the future.

== HertsLynx bus services ==
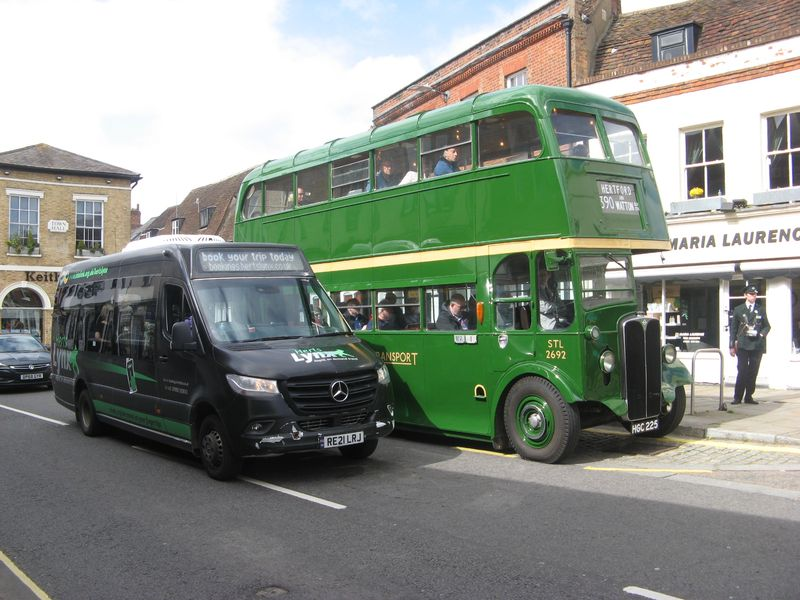
A HertsLynx passes a vintage London Transport bus in Ware

Since 2021, Intalink has operated HertsLynx, a demand-responsive transport service which provides bus connections from a variety of pickup and drop off locations Hertfordshire. Passengers can request bus services through a HertsLynx mobile app, through the Intalink website or by telephone.

== Ticketing ==
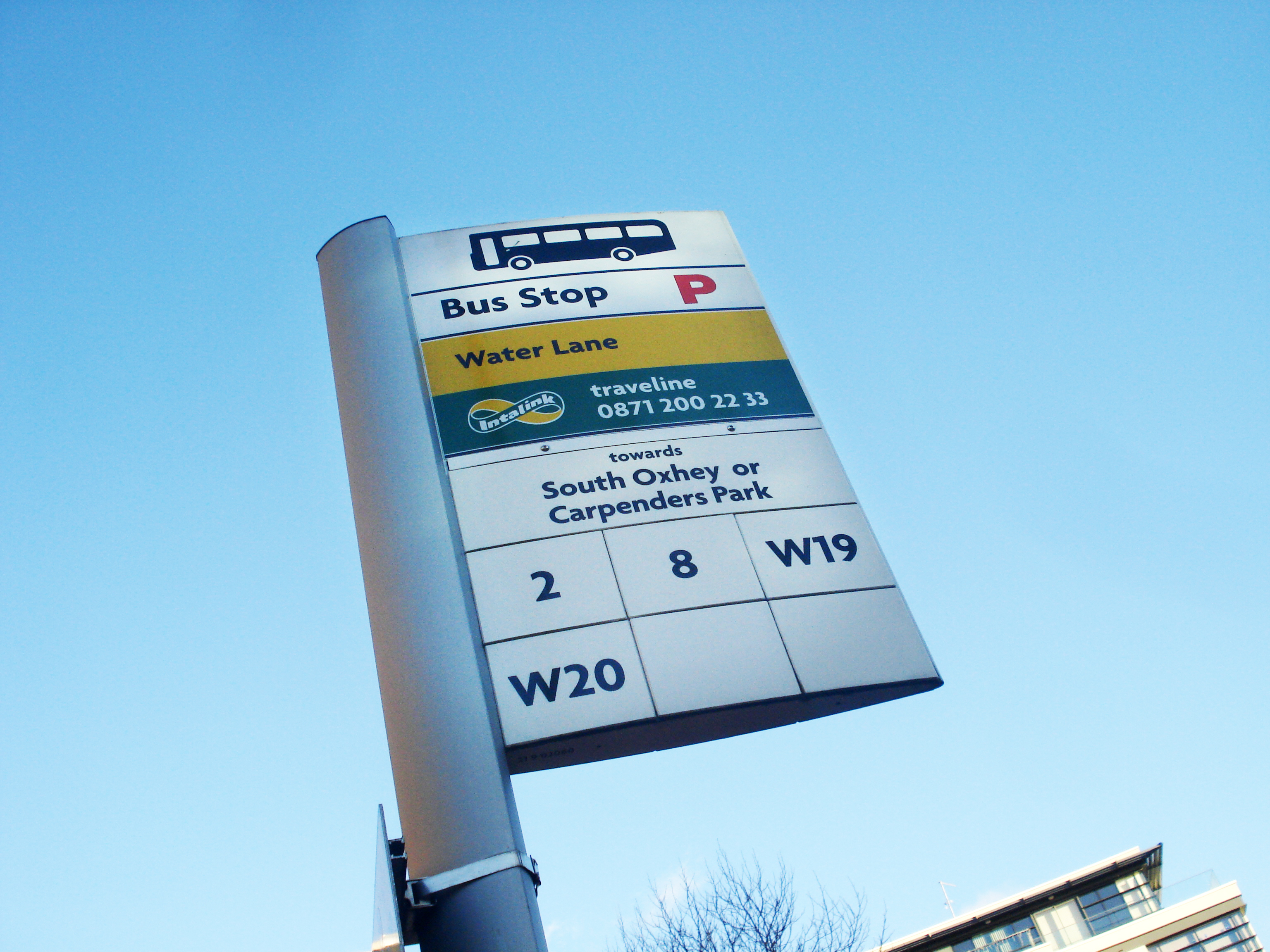
A bus stop in Watford displaying Intalink branding

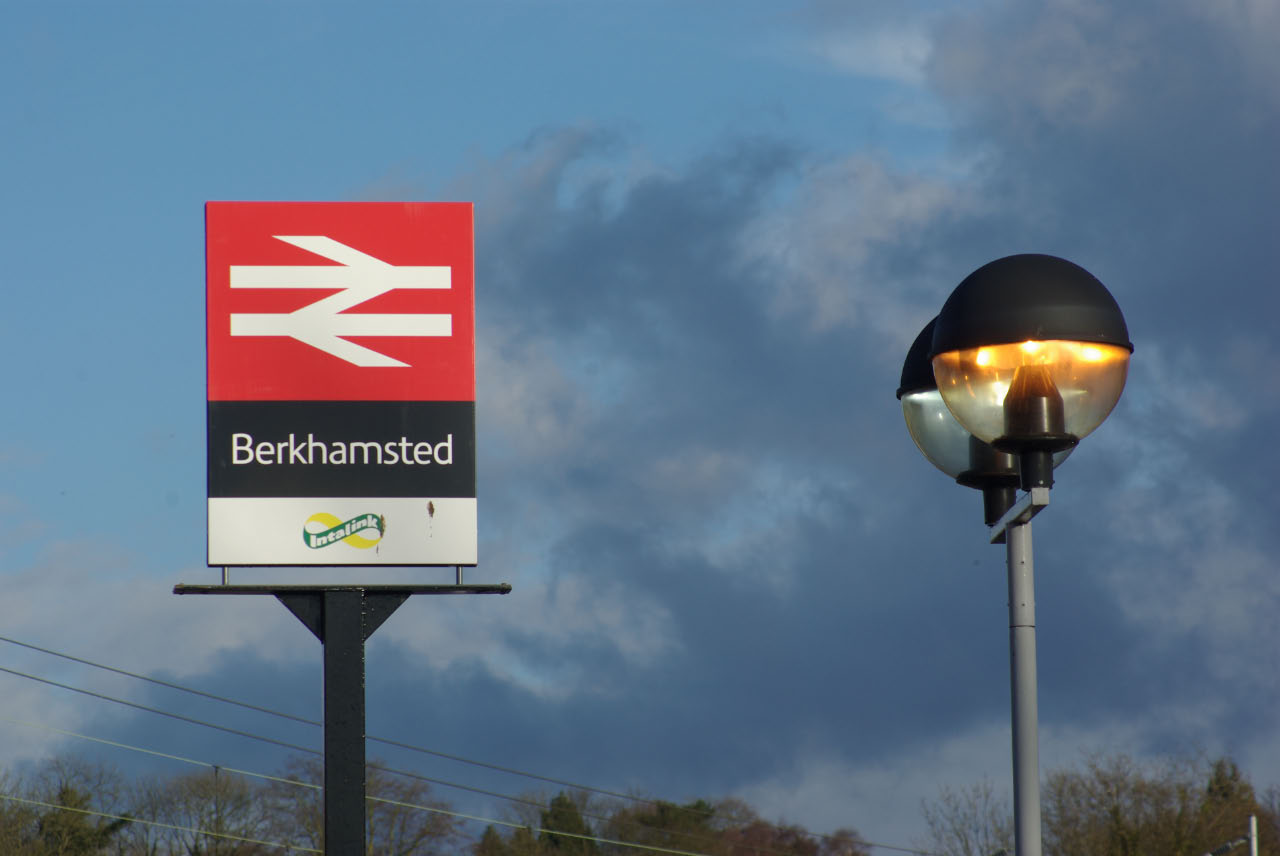
Berkhamsted railway station sign bearing the logos of National Rail and Intalink

Intalink manages a number of ticketing schemes across the county in coordination with bus operators. These are outlined below.

=== Intalink Connect ===
From 14th July 2024, Intalink Connect replaced Intalink Explorer and BusNET tickets providing unlimited bus travel in Hertfordshire.

=== Intalink Explorer ===
The Explorer ticket was introduced in 2001 and started off as a simple £6 ticket for one person that provided unlimited bus travel throughout the county. Since then it has developed and in there are five current types of Explorer tickets available:

- Unlimited travel for up to four people, no matter whether adult or child, across the whole network for £14.00 until midnight that day.
- Unlimited travel for one adult across the whole network for £8.50 until midnight that day.
- Unlimited travel for one child, or concessionary travel receiver, across the whole network for £4.25 until midnight that day.
- Unlimited travel for one adult across the whole network for one week for £32.00.
- Unlimited travel for one child across the whole network for one week for £21.00.

Regarding bus tickets, a child is defined as someone under the age of eleven or someone under the age of eighteen in possession of a Hertfordshire Savercard. Tickets are available and accepted on almost every service within the county, with few exceptions. The main exceptions are school services, coaches and services contracted to Transport for London. It is also not valid on Green Line service 724 between Maple Cross and Heathrow Airport. The Explorer is also valid in a number of locations outside the county, mainly services contracted to Essex County Council and services that are mainly in-county but leave the county for a section of route. All Intalink-produced timetables show the validity of Explorer tickets.

=== BusNET ===
This offers discounted season tickets to travel within specific places within the county. It is aimed at local students and businesses to get colleagues between home and their place of work or study. There are two examples in the county currently:

- Hertford Town Centre
- Hatfield Business Park

=== PlusBus ===
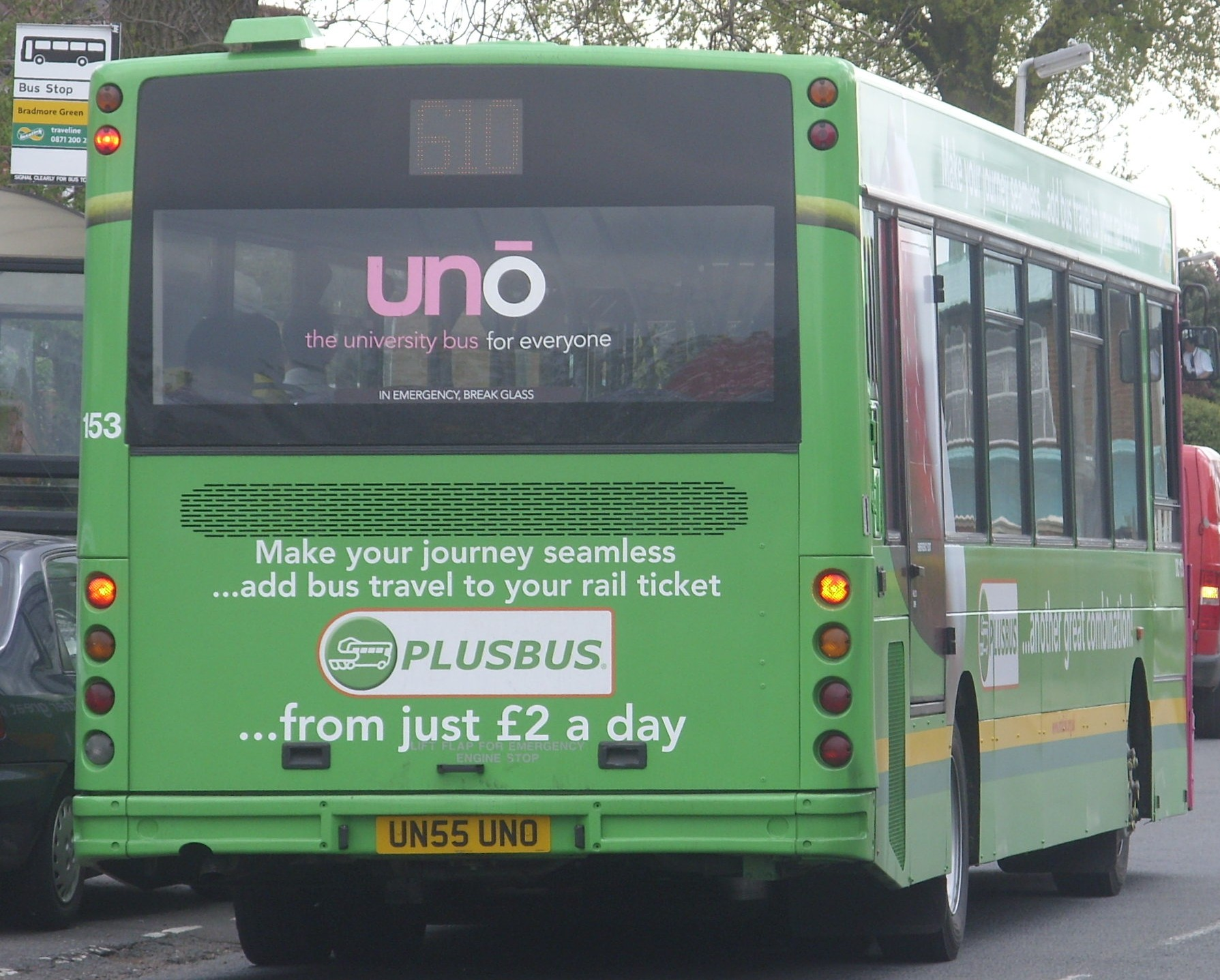
A bus operated by Uno promoting PlusBus.

This is a national scheme allowing integrated bus and train travel for one price. Intalink currently manage the promotion of this scheme in Hertfordshire. It is currently at 35 out of 50 rail stations in Hertfordshire and for a small supplementary charge to a rail ticket, unlimited bus travel in the area around the railway station is available. More information about the areas of validity are available on the PlusBus information page on the Intalink website.

== Controversies ==
=== 1.5x - 3x Price Hike with 3 weeks notice ===
In mid-August 2026 Intalink announced a new increase to the prices of their Connect tickets by 50% that would take effect on 6th September. The reason was due to huge increases in bus operating costs.

Hertfordshire County Council at the same time also announced the cancellation of their 26-59s and 60s+ SaverCard from 6th September and reduced the 50% discount to 30% for 11-19s. The reason was due to Bus Service Improvement Plan funding being exhausted.

Adult 26+	Daily	Weekly	4-Weekly
Hertfordshire Resident - Before 6th Sep 2026	£2.50	£9.50	£35.00
Non-Hertfordshire Resident - Before 6th Sep 2026	£5.00	£19.00	£70.00
All - 6th Sep 2026 onwards	£7.50	£28.50	£105.00

Some bus users have branded the price hike "disgusting" and "outrageous" given the poor bus frequencies and sometimes cancelled services.

== Future developments ==
In the future, there are many plans to promote and improve public transport through Intalink. There are plans to introduce real time information showing what time a bus will actually arrive, as opposed to the current system where just the scheduled time is shown. Bus stop timetables may be changed; currently Intalink are trialling stop specific timetables as opposed to the current type where the same timetable is posted at every bus stop. If the plans go ahead, operators will be able to also send out updates to the bus stops (where they have electronic displays) to display status updates and details of alterations or cancellations.
