= Bustimes.org =

Website

bustimes.org
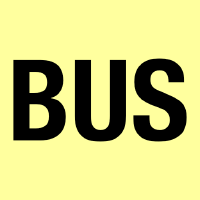
- Website type: Bus Timetable Website
- Available in: English
- Country of origin: United Kingdom
- Founder: Joshua Goodwin
- Website: bustimes.org
- Registration: Optional
- Current status: Live
- Written in: Python 3.9+

bustimes.org is a transportation information website created to take advantage of Bus Services Act 2017 requirement for bus operators in England to provide bus timetables, fares and vehicle locations in an open data format, which can be utilised by app and website developers. This DfT service is called the Bus Open Data Service.

The website also provides information on bus services in parts of the UK to which the Bus Services Act 2017 information requirement does not apply, as well as in Ireland.

Location data for operators partially or completely owned by Transport for Edinburgh, is supplied to the site via their Open Data system.

The site uses data from AVL tracking to determine and transmit the geographic location of a vehicle, such as data from Ticketer machines and the iBus system, in order to display live bus positions on a map.

The site also uses data from the National Public Transport Gazetteer, and bus stop locations from NaPTAN.

The live tracking system was added in response to the Department for Transport stating that they wanted "to see more people taking the bus, and those who do take it to have the best possible experience." with fares for companies operating the Passenger MyTrip system being added in 2022. Vehicle details (such as liveries, registration plates and fleet numbers) are all added by individual contributors using the edit vehicle information section.

== Criticism ==
The website was criticised by Centrebus Group owner, Julian Peddle, as lacking authority, not being an "official website", and questioning if trust can be placed in its information in an article in Buses magazine about bus timetable information.
