= Bus Open Data Service =

Open data initiative in England

Agency overview
- Formed: 28 January 2020
- Jurisdiction: England
- Ministers responsible: Heidi Alexander MP, Secretary of State; Simon Lightwood, Parliamentary Under Secretary of State for Local Transport
- Parent department: Department of Transport
- Website: www.bus-data.dft.gov.uk

The Bus Open Data Service (BODS) is a government-funded service in England, established in 2020 as part of the Bus Services Act 2017. It was created in a partnership between Ito World, the Department for Transport and KPMG.

The service was described by Ito World as "an international first", as it provides Open Data of bus timetables, fares and Automatic Vehicle Location of buses across England.

An extension to the Bus Open Data Service, Analyse Bus Open Data Service (ABOD), was introduced in 2021 to provide free-to-access reporting and analytics to operators and authorities nationally. The extended service provides access to on-time performance analytics, vehicle journey replays, and corridor reporting.

== Data implementation ==
As part of the requirements set by the Department for Transport in The Public Service Vehicles (Open Data) (England) Regulations 2020, the Bus Open Data Service set deadlines for operators to provide data.

The implementation requirements only applied in England

- 31 December 2020 — Obligation to provide bus timetable data to the Bus Open Data Service.
- 7 January 2021 — Obligation to provide vehicle location and basic fares and tickets data to the Bus Open Data Service.
- 7 January 2023 — Obligation to provide complex fares and ticket data to the Bus Open Data Service.

== Data provided ==
The Bus Open Data Service makes available three types of bus service data, in a variety of formats:

- Timetable data in TransXChange, a XML-based data format for representing bus route and timetable information, and GTFS, a CSV-based format which represents schedule data, as well as routes, trips, stop times, and stop locations.
- Location data in SIRI-VM, an XML-based data format for representing live vehicle locations, and GTFS-RT (GTFS Realtime), a real-time extension of GTFS provided as Protocol Buffers messages.
- Fares data as NeTEx (NeTex Network Timetable Exchange), an XML-based offering which "allows for accurate representations of operators’ fares offerings to the market, which can then be accessed and used in journey planning applications"

== Uses ==
Following the introduction of the Bus Open Data, there have been a number of uses for the system.

- The website bustimes.org utilises data from BODS to supply information such as timetable, fares, and vehicle location information via an API link, with the vehicle location information displaying on a map.
- The Traffic Commissioners for Great Britain, in their 2020/21 annual report, stated that use of the Bus Open Data Service would "make available more data than ever before on an operator’s performance."
- An article in TransportXtra explained how data from BODS can be used to plan an electrified bus fleet

== Criticism ==
Despite providing fare, time and vehicle location, the Department for Transport has ruled out including key accessibility information on bus stops, stations and vehicles despite the Bus Services Act making specific provision for open data, 'for the purpose of facilitating travel by disabled persons'.

A number of operators have struggled to provide the data required by the deadlines provided by the Bus Open Data Service, requiring providers to implement alternative solutions.

The Confederation of Passenger Transport, and operators of home-to-school transport, criticised the requirement for operators to provide data about registered home-to-school bus services, and the exemption of Section 22 community bus services.

Writing in Buses magazine, Centrebus Group owner Julian Peddle called the service "a horrendously bureaucratic and over-engineered system designed by well-meaning but clueless officials in London. It’s running late, does not work properly, and has involved the industry and local authorities in vast amounts of needless work. It’s supposedly been running since January 2021, but has not improved things in the wilds of Shropshire, and never will, because government bureaucrats don’t understand the problem, so have no chance of solving it."
