= Cycle street =

Cycle street may refer to:

- Bicycle boulevard, a road designed mainly for cycle traffic
- CycleStreets, an online Journey planner, based in the United Kingdom
