= Plusbus =

Add on rail ticket providing travel on buses

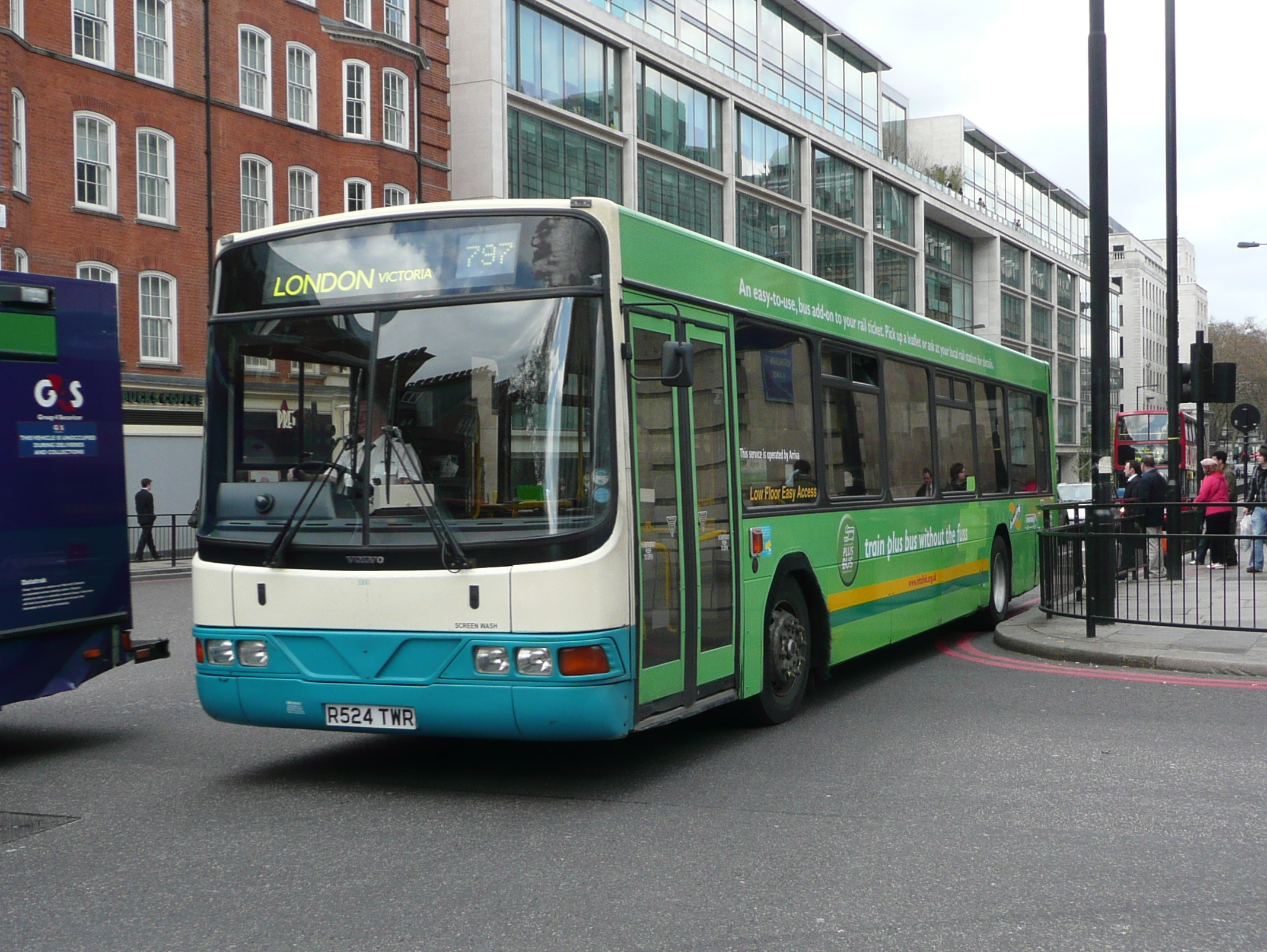
An Arriva Shires & Essex bus advertising Plusbus

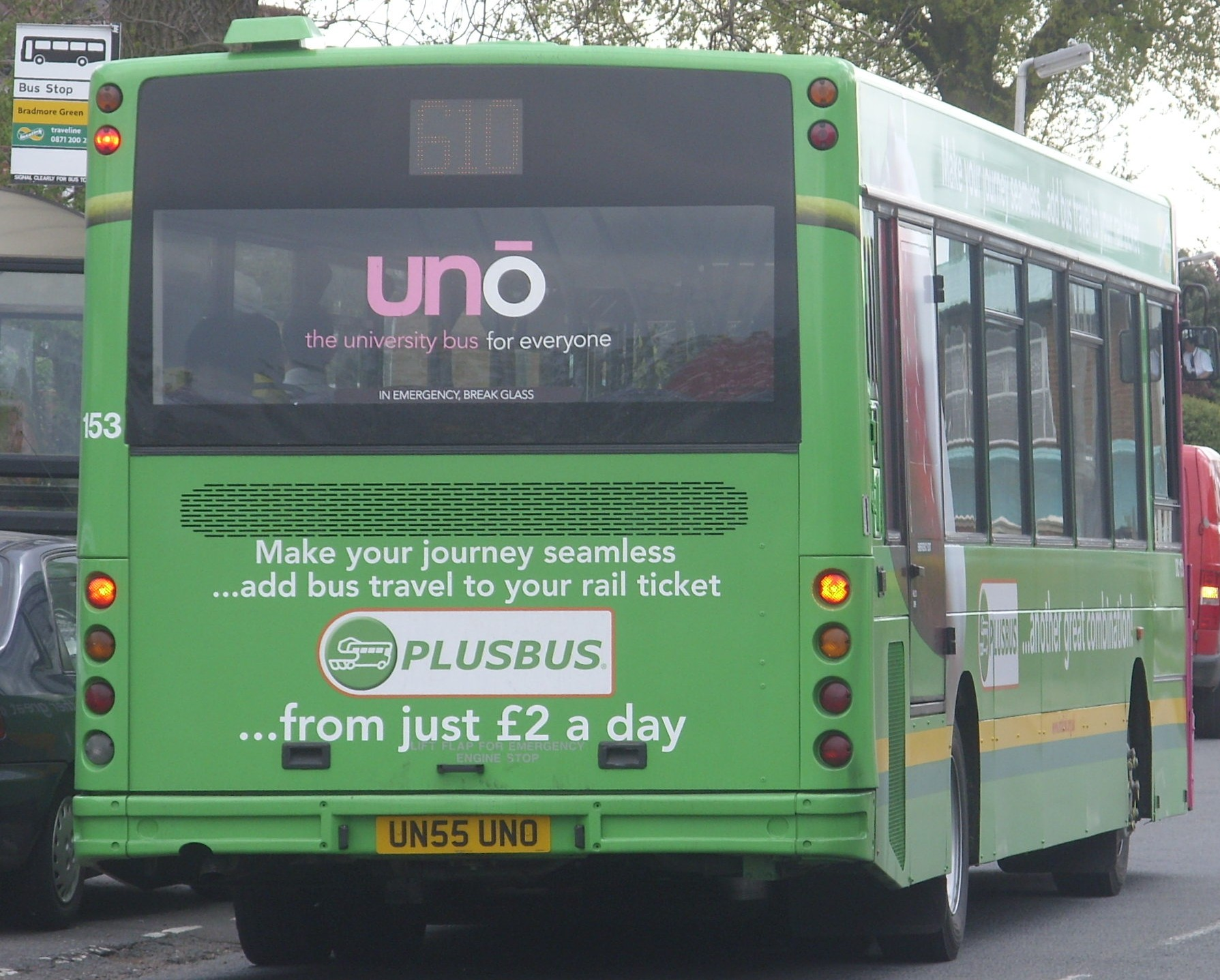
An Uno bus advertising Plusbus

Plusbus is an add-on ticket, which can be purchased with National Rail train tickets in the United Kingdom. It allows unlimited travel on participating bus and tram operators' services in the whole urban area of rail-served towns and cities.

== History ==
The Plusbus scheme was launched in October 2002 across an initial 35 railway stations. Since 2021, the scheme has been operated by Traveline, and was previously administered by Journey Solutions, a not for profit partnership of bus operators Arriva, FirstGroup, Go-Ahead, National Express and Stagecoach, the Confederation of Passenger Transport and the Rail Delivery Group.

Plusbus won the International Road Transport Union Eurochallenge Award in 2007 for its model of private partnership providing outstanding social and customer value.

== Rail and bus ticketing ==
Plusbus is available in 290 towns and cities, London is a notable exception. It gives the rail traveller unlimited local bus travel around the whole urban area of the origin and/or destination town(s) of their rail journey. It is not valid with train journeys made within the same city or town. Prices start from £2.50 for a day's travel, in addition to the rail fare. Season tickets are available for most destinations. Railcard holders get one-third off Plusbus day ticket prices. Children (aged under 16 years old) get 50% off Plusbus day ticket prices.

Plusbus tickets can be purchased with train tickets from all National Rail station ticket offices, by phone, through National Rail travel agents and selected self-service ticket machines. Over 200 bus and tram operators participate in Plusbus schemes across Britain. Tickets are also sold by all train operating companies online and most third-party online rail ticket retailers.

Originally issued in traditional paper format, some operators have facilitated its inclusion on their smart card platforms. Since 2024, it has also been available in electronic ticket format.
