= Goods Vehicles (Licensing of Operators) Act 1995 =

Act of the Parliament of the United Kingdom

Goods Vehicles (Licensing of Operators) Act 1995 (Note: Section 62(1).)
- Act of Parliament
- Parliament of the United Kingdom
- Long title: An Act to consolidate Part V of the Transport Act 1968 and related provisions concerning the licensing of operators of certain goods vehicles.
- Citation: 1995 c. 23
- Territorial extent: England and Wales; Scotland; (Note: Section 62(3).)

Dates
- Royal assent: 19 July 1995
- Commencement: 1 January 1996 (Note: Section 61(1). The Goods Vehicles (Licensing of Operators) Act 1995 (Commencement and Transitional Provisions) Order 1995 (SI 1995/2181).)

Other legislation
- Amends: See § Repealed enactments
- Repeals/revokes: See § Repealed enactments
- Amended by: Planning (Consequential Provisions) (Scotland) Act 1997; Secretary of State for the Environment, Transport and the Regions Order 1997; Goods Vehicle Operators (Qualifications) Regulations 1999; Transport Act 2000; Criminal Justice Act 2003; Statute Law (Repeals) Act 2004; Goods Vehicle Operators (Qualifications) (Amendment) Regulations 2004; Mental Capacity Act 2005; Road Safety Act 2006; Armed Forces Act 2006; Environmental Permitting (England and Wales) Regulations 2007; Local Transport Act 2008; Transfer of Functions (Transport Tribunal and Appeal Panel) Order 2009; Companies Act 2006 (Consequential Amendments, Transitional Provisions and Savings) Order 2009; Environmental Permitting (England and Wales) Regulations 2010; Road Vehicles (Powers to Stop) Regulations 2011; Treaty of Lisbon (Changes in Terminology) Order 2011; Criminal Justice and Licensing (Scotland) Act 2010 (Consequential Provisions and Modifications) Order 2011; Road Transport Operator Regulations 2011; Legal Aid, Sentencing and Punishment of Offenders Act 2012; Tribunals, Courts and Enforcement Act 2007 (Consequential Amendments) Order 2012; Local Transport Act 2008 (Traffic Commissioners) (Consequential Amendments) Order 2013; Enterprise and Regulatory Reform Act 2013 (Consequential Amendments) (Bankruptcy) and the Small Business, Enterprise and Employment Act 2015 (Consequential Amendments) Regulations 2016; Environmental Permitting (England and Wales) Regulations 2016; Haulage Permits and Trailer Registration Act 2018; Licensing of Operators and International Road Haulage (Amendment etc.) (EU Exit) Regulations 2019; Sentencing Act 2020; Goods Vehicles (Licensing of Operators) (Amendment) Regulations 2022

Status: Amended

Text of statute as originally enacted

Revised text of statute as amended

Text of the Goods Vehicles (Licensing of Operators) Act 1995 as in force today (including any amendments) within the United Kingdom, from legislation.gov.uk.

The Goods Vehicles (Licensing of Operators) Act 1995 (c. 23) is an act of the Parliament of the United Kingdom that consolidated enactments related to the licensing of operators of goods vehicles in Great Britain.

== Provisions ==
=== Repealed enactments ===
Section 60(2) of the act repealed 24 enactments and revoked 10 instruments, listed in parts I and II of schedule 8 to the act, respectively.

Part I — Enactments repealed
Citation	Short title	Extent of repeal
8 & 9 Eliz. 2. c. 16	Road Traffic Act 1960	Section 233.
8 & 9 Eliz. 2. c. 16	Road Traffic Act 1960	Section 235.
8 & 9 Eliz. 2. c. 16	Road Traffic Act 1960	In section 244, the words from "under section 233" to the second occurrence of the words "or an offence".
8 & 9 Eliz. 2. c. 16	Road Traffic Act 1960	Section 263.
8 & 9 Eliz. 2. c. 16	Road Traffic Act 1960	Section 265.
1968 c. 73	Transport Act 1968	Part V.
1968 c. 73	Transport Act 1968	In section 158(1), the words "other than Part V".
1968 c. 73	Transport Act 1968	Schedule 8A.
1968 c. 73	Transport Act 1968	Schedule 10.
1973 c. 65	Local Government (Scotland) Act 1973	In Schedule 18, paragraph 18.
1974 c. 50	Road Traffic Act 1974	Section 16.
1974 c. 50	Road Traffic Act 1974	Schedule 4.
1975 c. 46	International Road Haulage Permits Act 1975	Section 3.
1976 c. 3	Road Traffic (Drivers' Ages and Hours of Work) Act 1976	Section 2(2).
1979 c. 5	Hydrocarbon Oil Duties Act 1979	In Schedule 6, paragraph 2.
1980 c. 34	Transport Act 1980	Section 66(2).
1980 c. 34	Transport Act 1980	In Schedule 4, the entry relating to section 235 of the Road Traffic Act 1960.
1981 c. 14	Public Passenger Vehicles Act 1981	In Schedule 7, paragraph 9.
1981 c. 45	Forgery and Counterfeiting Act 1981	In section 12, the words "section 233(2) of the Road Traffic Act 1960, and".
1982 c. 49	Transport Act 1982	Section 52.
1982 c. 49	Transport Act 1982	Section 76(5).
1982 c. 49	Transport Act 1982	Schedule 4.
1982 c. 49	Transport Act 1982	In Schedule 5, paragraph 6.
1984 c. 27	Road Traffic Regulation Act 1984	In Schedule 13, paragraph 6.
1985 c. 9	Companies Consolidation (Consequential Provisions) Act 1985	In Schedule 2, the entries relating to sections 69(11) and 92(1) of the Transport Act 1968.
1985 c. 65	Insolvency Act 1985	In Schedule 8, paragraph 16.
1985 c. 67	Transport Act 1985	Section 3(4).
1985 c. 67	Transport Act 1985	In Schedule 4, in paragraph 9(1), the words "Part V of the 1968 Act".
1988 c. 52	Road Traffic Act 1988	In section 85, the definition of "licensing authority".
1988 c. 52	Road Traffic Act 1988	In section 86, the entry relating to the expression "licensing authority".
1988 c. 54	Road Traffic (Consequential Provisions) Act 1988	In Schedule 3, paragraphs 2(1) and 6(1), (2) and (4).
1989 c. 40	Companies Act 1989	In Schedule 18, paragraph 7.
1990 c. 11	Planning (Consequential Provisions) Act 1990	In Schedule 2, paragraph 22(1).
1990 c. 43	Environmental Protection Act 1990	In Schedule 15, paragraph 10(2).
1991 c. 40	Road Traffic Act 1991	In Schedule 4, paragraph 1.
1992 c. 52	Trade Union and Labour Relations (Consolidation) Act 1992	In Schedule 2, paragraph 2.
1994 c. 39	Local Government etc. (Scotland) Act 1994	In Schedule 13, paragraph 80(8).
1994 c. 40	Deregulation and Contracting Out Act 1994	Chapter III of Part I.
1994 c. 40	Deregulation and Contracting Out Act 1994	Schedule 12.
1994 c. 40	Deregulation and Contracting Out Act 1994	Schedule 13.

Part II — Subordinate legislation revoked
Citation	Title	Extent of revocation
SI 1981/1373	Road Traffic Acts 1960 and 1972, Road Traffic Regulation Act 1967, and Transport Act 1968 (Metrication) Regulations 1981	Regulation 4(1) and in the Schedule, Part IIIA.
SI 1984/176	Goods Vehicles (Operators' Licences, Qualifications and Fees) Regulations 1984	Regulations 4 to 9.
SI 1984/176	Goods Vehicles (Operators' Licences, Qualifications and Fees) Regulations 1984	Regulation 23A.
SI 1984/176	Goods Vehicles (Operators' Licences, Qualifications and Fees) Regulations 1984	Regulation 33(2) and (3).
SI 1984/176	Goods Vehicles (Operators' Licences, Qualifications and Fees) Regulations 1984	Regulation 34A.
SI 1984/176	Goods Vehicles (Operators' Licences, Qualifications and Fees) Regulations 1984	Regulation 36.
SI 1984/176	Goods Vehicles (Operators' Licences, Qualifications and Fees) Regulations 1984	Schedule 6.
SI 1984/177	Road Traffic Acts 1960 and 1972, Road Traffic Regulation Act 1967, and Transport Act 1968 (Metrication) (Amendment) Regulations 1984	Both Regulations.
SI 1986/666	Goods Vehicles (Operators' Licences, Qualifications and Fees) (Amendment) Regulations 1986	Regulations 3, 8 and 10.
SI 1987/841	Goods Vehicles (Operators' Licences, Qualifications and Fees) (Amendment) Regulations 1987	Regulation 5.
SI 1990/1849	Goods Vehicles (Operators' Licences, Qualifications and Fees) (Amendment) Regulations 1990	Regulations 2(3), 4, 6 and 7.
SI 1990/2640	Goods Vehicles (Operators' Licences, Qualifications and Fees) (Amendment) (No.2) Regulations 1990	Regulation 4.
SI 1991/2239	Goods Vehicles (Operators' Licences, Qualifications and Fees) (Amendment) (No.2) Regulations 1991	Regulations 4 and 7.
SI 1992/2319	Goods Vehicles (Operators' Licences, Qualifications and Fees) (Amendment) Regulations 1992	Regulation 4.
SI 1992/3077	Goods Vehicles (Community Authorisations) Regulations 1992	Regulation 14.

== Subsequent developments ==
Section 50 of the act, and schedule 5 to it, which related to the qualification requirements for transport managers, were never brought into force.

The act has been substantially amended since it came into force. The Local Transport Act 2008 made significant amendments to the functions of the traffic commissioners under the act. Following the withdrawal of the United Kingdom from the European Union, the Licensing of Operators and International Road Haulage (Amendment etc.) (EU Exit) Regulations 2019 and the Goods Vehicles (Licensing of Operators) (Amendment) Regulations 2022 made further amendments to align the act with the new legal framework.
