= Stage carriage =

Stage carriage refers to a vehicle carrying or adapted to carry passengers. It may refer to:

- Stagecoach, a carriage drawn by one or more horses, ordinarily used for conveying passengers for hire
- Carriage (disambiguation)#Vehicles, various types of motor vehicles ("stage carriage" implying a vehicle serving public along fixed routes as against a "contract carriage" which is hired privately (not for public) for specific journey)
