= Transport Act 1980 =

Act of the Parliament of the United Kingdom

Transport Act 1980 (Note: Section 70(1).)
- Act of Parliament
- Parliament of the United Kingdom
- Long title: An Act to amend the law relating to public service vehicles; to make provision for and in connection with the transfer of the undertaking of the National Freight Corporation to a company; to provide for the making of payments by the Minister of Transport in aid of certain railway and other pension schemes; to amend Part VI of the Road Traffic Act 1972 as regards car-sharing arrangements; to make amendments about articulated vehicles; to prohibit the display of certain roof-signs on vehicles other than taxis; to abolish the Freight Integration Council and the Railways and Coastal Shipping Committee; to repeal certain provisions about special authorisations for the use of large goods vehicles and about charges on independent tramways, trolley vehicles and the like; and for connected purposes.
- Citation: 1980 c. 34
- Territorial extent: England and Wales; Scotland; Northern Ireland (in part); (Note: Section 70(7).)

Dates
- Royal assent: 30 June 1980
- Commencement: various (Note: Section 70(3)–(6).)

Other legislation
- Amends: Road Traffic Act 1960; London Government Act 1963; Road Traffic Act 1972; Energy Act 1976
- Amended by: Public Passenger Vehicles Act 1981; Road Traffic Regulation Act 1984; Road Traffic (Consequential Provisions) Act 1988; Goods Vehicles (Licensing of Operators) Act 1995; Statute Law (Repeals) Act 2004

Status: Amended

Text of statute as originally enacted

Revised text of statute as amended

Text of the Transport Act 1980 as in force today (including any amendments) within the United Kingdom, from legislation.gov.uk.

The Transport Act 1980 (c. 34) is an act of the Parliament of the United Kingdom in the United Kingdom.

== Provisions ==
The act introduced deregulation of coach services in the United Kingdom. The act allowed authorities to deregulate bus services on a trial basis through the government designating their area as a "trial area".

The later Transport Act 1985 imposed bus deregulation of local buses.

== Further developments ==
Between 1980 and 1982, intercity passenger carriage increased by approximately 60%.
