= Traffic Commissioners for Great Britain =

Bus regulator in the UK

Agency overview
- Formed: 1930
- Jurisdiction: Great Britain
- Headquarters: Leeds
- Ministers responsible: Heidi Alexander MP, Secretary of State; Simon Lightwood MP, Parliamentary Under Secretary of State for Local Transport
- Parent department: Department for Transport
- Website: www.gov.uk/government/organisations/traffic-commissioners

The Traffic Commissioners for Great Britain are responsible for the licensing and regulation of the operators of heavy goods vehicles, buses and coaches, and the registration of local bus services in Great Britain (as opposed to the entire United Kingdom).

== History ==
The Road Traffic Act 1930 divided Great Britain into twelve traffic areas: Metropolitan, Northern, Yorkshire, North-Western, West Midland, East Midland, Eastern, South Wales, Western, Southern, South-Eastern and Scottish (the Southern traffic area was discontinued by section 27 of the Road and Rail Traffic Act 1933, and its responsibilities split between the Western and South-Eastern areas).

The Road Traffic Act 1930 empowered the Secretary of State for Transport to appoint a panel of three traffic commissioners for each traffic area, to operate in each traffic area as a body known as the 'traffic commissioners' – and with powers only within that area. Of the three commissioners for each area, the chairman of the panel was appointed solely by the Transport Secretary, one from a list drawn up by county councils covered by the traffic area, and one from a list drawn up by district councils covered by the traffic area. The powers of the traffic commissioners only extended to the licensing and regulation of bus services initially; licensing of 'stage carriages' to ply for hire for passengers had previously been a responsibility of local authorities.

The system of traffic areas and traffic commissioners was re-stated in the Road Traffic Act 1960. This changed the system for the Metropolitan Traffic Area, where a single traffic commissioner was appointed by the Ministry of Transport. Until 1965, the Metropolitan Traffic Commissioner operated in tandem with the London and Home Counties Traffic Advisory Committee, as did other traffic commissioners whose traffic area overlapped with the outer parts of the London Traffic Area.

The Transport Act 1968 designated the chairman of each panel of traffic commissioners (rather than the traffic commissioners as a group) as the licensing authority for the operation of goods vehicles.

The system of traffic commissioners was re-stated, with minor alterations, by the Public Passenger Vehicles Act 1981.

The Local Transport Act 2008 amended this system. The Secretary of State for Transport now appoints traffic commissioners for England and Wales, and a single traffic commissioner for Scotland. Whilst individual traffic areas continue to exist in England and Wales, the powers of individual traffic commissioners are no longer limited by them.

The Local Transport Act also introduced a role of senior traffic commissioner; one of the traffic commissioners is designated to lead and direct the others.

The traffic commissioners are assisted in their role by deputy traffic commissioners. Deputy traffic commissioners have the same powers and jurisdiction as traffic commissioners.

== Current traffic commissioners ==
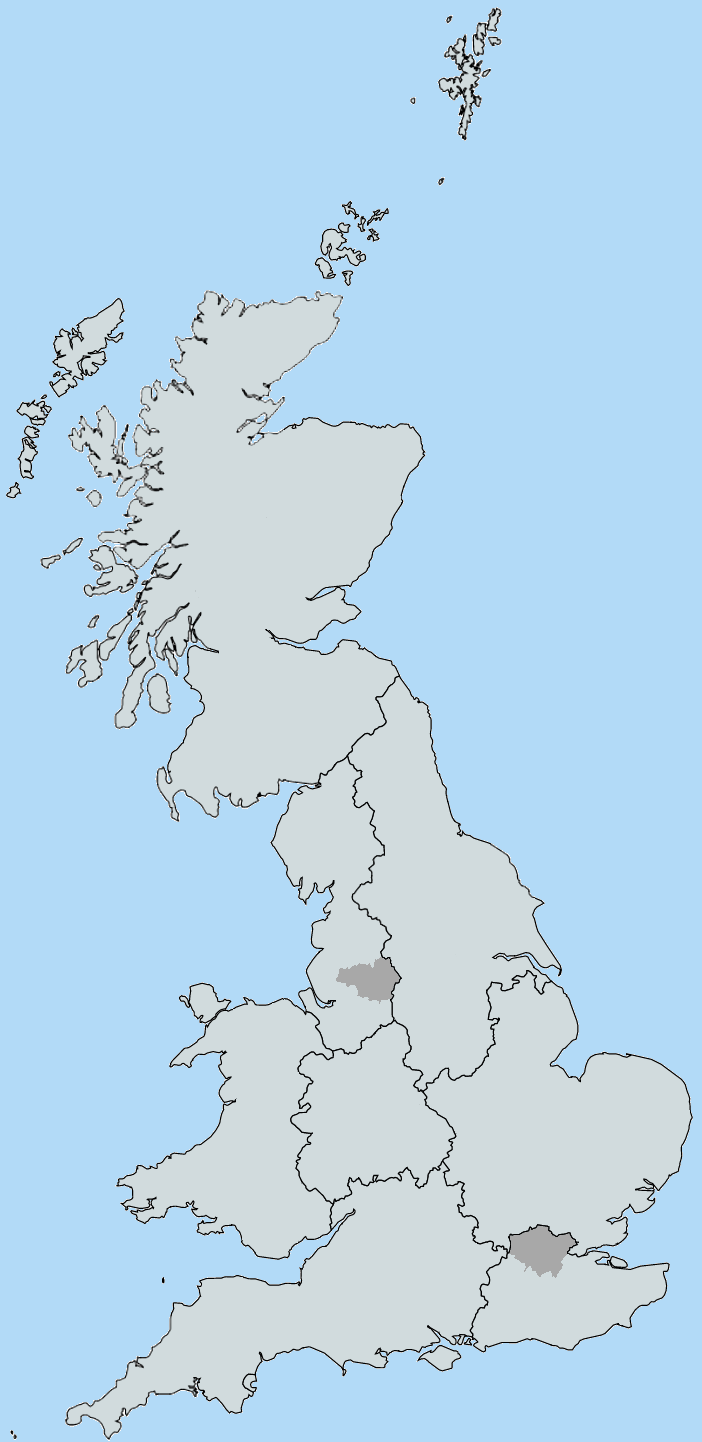
The current traffic areas.

There were as of June 2026 , Six traffic commissioners; one is also the senior traffic commissioner:

Miles Dorrington, the former traffic commissioner of the West Midlands, announced his retirement on 4th June 2026. He is now a deputy traffic commissioner for the West of England.

Following this, Tim Blackmore OBE took over the West Midlands traffic area and also remains as acting traffic commissioner for the North East of England, which was his former post.

List of current traffic commissioners
Name	Traffic area	Notes
David Mullan	North West of England	
Kevin Rooney	West of England	Additionally, Senior Traffic Commissioner
Sarah Bell	London and the South East	
Richard Turfitt OBE	East of England	
Tim Blackmore OBE (Acting)	North East of England	
Tim Blackmore OBE	West Midlands	
Sharon Clelland	Scotland	
Kevin Rooney (acting)	Wales	

== Tribunal ==
The Traffic Commissioners for Great Britain is a tribunal non-departmental public body, sponsored by the Department for Transport.

== Criticism ==
The traffic commissioners have been described as toothless tigers by Cycling UK because they lack investigatory powers. They cannot act until a case is brought before them, and this can cause long delays.
