= Bus Services Act 2017 =

Act of the Parliament of the United Kingdom

Bus Services Act 2017 (Note: Section 27.)
- Act of Parliament
- Parliament of the United Kingdom
- Long title: An Act to make provision about bus services; and for connected purposes.
- Citation: 2017 c. 21
- Introduced by: Chris Grayling MP, Secretary of State for Transport (Commons); Lord Ahmad of Wimbledon (Lords)
- Territorial extent: England and Wales; Scotland; (Note: Section 25.)

Dates
- Royal assent: 27 April 2017
- Commencement: 27 June 2017 (Note: Section 26.)

Other legislation
- Amends: Road Traffic Regulation Act 1984; Transport Act 1985; Transport Act 2000; Local Transport Act 2008; Equality Act 2010
- Amended by: Bus Services Act 2025

Status: Amended

History of passage through Parliament

Text of statute as originally enacted

Revised text of statute as amended

The Bus Services Act 2017 (c. 21) is an act of the Parliament of the United Kingdom. It provides for local transport authorities in England to create partnership schemes to improve bus services in their areas, and to introduce advanced ticketing schemes.

The act also provides for mayoral combined authorities to partially re-regulate bus services by creating franchise schemes similar to the one operated by Transport for London. It, however, prohibits local authorities from reversing complete bus deregulation, which had taken place following the Transport Act 1985, by forming a company for the purpose of providing local services.

== Franchising schemes ==
=== Greater Manchester ===
The Mayor of Greater Manchester announced on 13 December 2017 that, following regulations laid down by the Secretary of State for Transport under the act coming in to effect the following week, Greater Manchester would become the first city-region to start the process of bus franchising by requesting data from bus operators.

On 24 June 2019, Transport for Greater Manchester proposed that a bus franchise system was the region's preferred option. The Greater Manchester Combined Authority accepted the assessment on 28 June 2019 and instructed independent auditors to provide a report as required by the act.

Following on from the audit, the GMCA announced a public consultation on the combined authority's plans for its franchising scheme on 7 October 2019, with the consultation running for three months and closing in January 2020. The consultation closed on 8 January 2020, with more than 8,000 responses with the results and a final decision on the scheme planned for publication by March 2020. In June 2020 the GMCA announced that 83% of consultation respondents supported the proposed franchise scheme, however the COVID-19 pandemic's impact on bus services prompted them to carry out an additional consultation running from 2 December 2020 until the 29 January 2021. In March 2021 the GMCA announced that 82% of respondents to the second consultation supported the franchising scheme.

On 25 March 2021 Andy Burnham announced the decision that buses in Greater Manchester would be franchised following nine of the ten local authority members of the GMCA voting in favour of the scheme.

Franchised services were introduced in three phases over two years, starting with Bolton, Wigan and parts of Bury and Salford on 17 September 2023, Oldham, Rochdale, the rest of Bury, further parts of Salford and north Manchester on 24 March 2024 and completing with the remaining parts of Greater Manchester (Stockport, Tameside, Trafford, and the rest of Manchester and Salford) on 5 January 2025.

==== Legal challenges ====
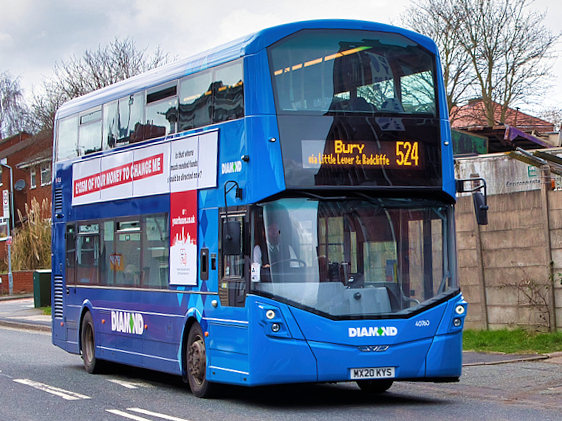
A Diamond North West double-decker bus with a 'yourbuses.co.uk' anti-franchising advertisement in Radcliffe in March 2021

The plans to franchise bus services in the Greater Manchester area were criticised by both Rotala and Stagecoach Group, with Rotala taking the case to judicial review, a process under which executive, legislative and administrative actions are subject to review by the judiciary. Rotala operator Diamond Bus North West launched a website which stated that £20 million has already gone on consultants towards the bus franchising proposals.

In March 2022 the franchising system was judged by the courts to be lawful, with both Stagecoach and Rotala stating they were disappointed by the decision.

Justice Julian Knowles stated in his decision that he was not "persuaded the impugned decisions were either unlawful or irrational". Stagecoach accepted Mr Justice Knowles’ decision and did not seek leave to appeal, however Rotala later appealed against the decision of the courts. On 25 July 2022 the Court of Appeal dismissed the appeal.

=== Liverpool City Region ===
In October 2023, the Liverpool City Region Combined Authority announced that it would use the act's powers to bring buses under public control, becoming the second combined authority to do so. Regulated services are expected to start operating under the Metro brand from 2026.

=== West Yorkshire ===
The West Yorkshire Combined Authority held a statutory consultation on introducing a franchising scheme between October 2023 and January 2024, with the Mayor, Tracy Brabin, announcing on 14 March 2024 that a franchising scheme will be introduced; on 12 May, this was announced by Brabin to be named the Weaver Network, a reference to the region's cultural and textile industry heritage. Franchised services are expected to start in Kirklees, Leeds and Wakefield in March 2027.

=== South Yorkshire ===
Between 23 October 2024 and 15 January 2025, the South Yorkshire Mayoral Combined Authority held a public consultation on bus reform within the region, which consists of the cities and towns of Sheffield, Barnsley, Doncaster and Rotherham. 7,802 responses were collated from members of the public and organisations. In March 2025, it was decided that the franchising scheme would go ahead with the first franchised services beginning by the end of 2027 and full implementation by 2029. The network's South Yorkshire People's Network branding would later be unveiled on 16 March 2026, and is set to replace the previous Travel South Yorkshire brand.

== Bus Open Data ==
The Bus Services Act required the Department for Transport to work with operators to provide open data systems for bus timetables, fares and vehicle locations in England.

This requirement was implemented by the Bus Open Data Service with a requirement for operators to provide AVL, timetable and basic fare information by January 2021 and local authorities to provide stop data by December 2020.

=== Implementations ===
A small number of websites have included Bus Open Data information including:

- bustimes.org - A website which has implemented timetable, stop, fares and vehicle location data

=== Criticism ===
Despite providing fare, time and vehicle location, the Department for Transport has ruled out including key accessibility information on bus stops, stations and vehicles despite the Bus Services Act making specific provision for open data, 'for the purpose of facilitating travel by disabled persons'.
