= A New Deal for Trunk Roads in England =

UK government report

A New Deal for Trunk Roads in England was a response by the United Kingdom Government's Department for Transport to A New Deal for Transport: Better for everyone - a report that reviewed the government's strategic roads programme, based on criteria of accessibility, safety, economy, environment and integration.

The recommendations made in the response were:

1. To move the Highways Agency in a new direction.
2. To create a core network of routes of national importance.
3. To improve maintenance, use and planning arrangements for trunk roads.
4. To create dedicated budgets to address noise pollution and road safety.
5. To create a targeted programme of large-scale improvements to the road system.

== See also ==
- M11 link road protest
