= Local Transport Act 2008 =

Act of the Parliament of the United Kingdom

Local Transport Act 2008 (Note: Section 135.)
- Act of Parliament
- Parliament of the United Kingdom
- Long title: An Act to make further provision in relation to local transport authorities, the provision and regulation of road transport services and the subsidising of passenger transport services; to amend sections 74, 75 and 79 of the Transport Act 1985; to make provision for or in relation to committees which represent the interests of users of public transport; to rename Passenger Transport Authorities as Integrated Transport Authorities and to make further provision in relation to them; to make further provision in relation to charging for the use of roads; to make provision about the meaning of "street works" and "street works licence" in Part 3 of the New Roads and Street Works Act 1991; to amend Part 6 of the Traffic Management Act 2004 and section 90F of the Road Traffic Offenders Act 1988; to make provision in relation to the acquisition, disclosure and use of information relating to vehicles registered outside the United Kingdom; and for connected purposes.
- Citation: 2008 c. 26
- Introduced by: Ruth Kelly (Commons); Lord Bassam of Brighton (Lords)
- Territorial extent: England and Wales; Scotland (in part); Northern Ireland (in part); (Note: Section 133.)

Dates
- Royal assent: 26 November 2008
- Commencement: Various (Note: Section 134.)
Other legislation
Amends	Public Passenger Vehicles Act 1981; Road Traffic Regulation Act 1984; Rates Act 1984; Transport Act 1985; Airports Act 1986; Road Traffic Offenders Act 1988; Value Added Tax Act 1994; Goods Vehicles (Licensing of Operators) Act 1995; Education Act 1996; Traffic Management Act 2004; Constitutional Reform Act 2005; Railways Act 2005; Government of Wales Act 2006
Amended by	Co-operative and Community Benefit Societies Act 2014; Cities and Local Government Devolution Act 2016; Bus Services Act 2017
Relates to	New Roads and Street Works Act 1991

Status: Amended

History of passage through Parliament

Text of statute as originally enacted

Text of the Local Transport Act 2008 as in force today (including any amendments) within the United Kingdom, from legislation.gov.uk.

The Local Transport Act 2008 (c. 26) is an act of the Parliament of the United Kingdom which gave more powers to local authorities in relation to local bus services.

== Provisions ==
The act allows the Senior Traffic Commissioner to give guidance and general directions to traffic commissioners and deputies after consulting them. Traffic commissioners are given more powers to fine operators. The Act removes the ability of the Competition and Markets Authority to fine operators, which are involved in certain types of partnerships subsequently found to be anti-competitive.

=== Section 134 – Commencement ===
Orders made under this section:

- The Local Transport Act 2008 (Commencement No. 1 and Transitional Provisions) Order 2009 (SI 2009/107) (C.8)
- The Local Transport Act 2008 (Commencement No. 1 and Transitional Provisions) (Wales) Order 2009 (SI 2009/579) (W.55)
- The Local Transport Act 2008 (Commencement No. 2 and Transitional Provision) Order 2009 (SI 2009/3242) (C.142)
- The Local Transport Act 2008 (Commencement No. 2) (Wales) Order 2009 (SI 2009/3294) (W. 291) (C. 146)

== Bibliography ==
- Halsbury's Statutes
- Current Law Statutes Annotated 2008
