= Cycling England =

- Formation: 10 March 2005
- Dissolved: 1 April 2011
- Legal status: Non-departmental public body funded by the DfT
- Purpose: Cycling in England
- Location: London, SW1
- Region served: England
- Members: Cyclists
- Main organ: Board (Chairman – Phillip Darnton)
- Parent organization: Department for Transport
- Affiliations: Cycling Training Standards Board, British Cycling, CTC, RoSPA, Road Safety GB, Sustrans
- Budget: £60m (2010/11)
- Website: Cycling England
- Remarks: Cycling England ceased to exist as a public body on 1 April 2011.

Cycling England was an independent body funded by the Department for Transport to promote cycling in England. It was founded in 2005 to replace the National Cycling Strategy Board. Following the 2010 Comprehensive Spending review it was earmarked for abolition, to be replaced by Local Sustainability Travel Funds and new ways of supporting cycling. Cycling England ceased to exist as a public body on 1 April 2011.

== History ==
It was established in 2005, with the minister responsible being Charlotte Atkins. Funding was initially £5m a year, leading to £10m in 2006, £20m in 2008, and £60m in 2009 and 2010.

An announcement in October 2010 confirmed that the body would be abolished as part of the government's comprehensive spending review. Cycling England ceased to exist as a public body on 1 April 2011.

The government has created a Local Sustainability Travel Fund and will develop other ways of supporting cycling. Local Sustainability Travel Funds which were announced in late September 2010 by Norman Baker will support local transport initiatives that reduce carbon emissions using from a centrally managed fund.

== Projects ==
=== Cycling Cities, Cycling Towns ===
Cycling England helped establish a number of cycling demonstration towns. Between 2005 and 2008 six towns across England received European levels of funding to significantly increase their cycling levels Aylesbury, Brighton and Hove, Darlington, Derby, Exeter and 'Lancaster with Morecambe' collectively received over £7m from Cycling England across three years, plus local match-funding, to deliver a range of measures designed to get more people cycling. In January 2008, the Government provided a further £140m over three years for the program which was awarded to Bristol, Blackpool, Cambridge, Colchester, Chester, Leighton-Linslade, Shrewsbury, Southend, Southport, Stoke-on-Trent, Woking and York in June 2008 .

=== Bikeability ===
Bikeability was launched in March 2007 and supported three levels of cycle training for children:

- Level One : teaching basic skills and bicycle handling
- Level Two : giving children the skills they need to cycle safely to school on quiet roads
- Level Three : covering more complicated traffic environments

The scheme was adopted by half the local authorities in England and it worked closely with 'Bike to School Week'. It was estimated that by 2012, 500,000 children will have taken part in Bikeability training.

=== National Cycle Journey Planner ===
Cycling England worked for Transport Direct to provide a national urban Cycle Journey Planner through the Transport Direct Portal. Work is largely complete with a number of pilot areas.

== Management ==
Cycling England was managed by a board consisting of:

- Phillip Darnton (previously chair of the National Cycle Strategy Board)
- Alison Hill (Managing Director of Solutions for Public Health)
- Peter King (Chief Executive at British Cycling)
- Kevin Mayne (chief Executive of the Cyclists' Touring Club)
- Dave Merrett (elected member of York City Council, previous leader of Transport from 1988–2002)
- Malcolm Shepherd (Chief executive of Sustrans)
- Dr Lynn Sloman (Vice-Chair of the Commission for Integrated Transport)
- Chris Spencer (Director of Education & Children’s Services at the London Borough of Hillingdon)
- Christian Wolmar (writer and broadcaster specialising in transport, previously transport correspondent for The Independent)

== See also ==
- National Cycle Network
- Active Travel England
