= Road Safety Act 2006 =

Act of the Parliament of the United Kingdom

Road Safety Act 2006 (Note: Section 63.)
- Act of Parliament
- Parliament of the United Kingdom
- Long title: An Act to make provision about road traffic, registration plates, vehicle and driver information, hackney carriages and private hire vehicles, and trunk road picnic areas.
- Citation: 2006 c. 49
- Territorial extent: United Kingdom (Note: Section 62.)

Dates
- Royal assent: 8 November 2006
- Commencement: Various (Note: Section 61.)
Other legislation
Amends	Criminal Justice Act 1972; Public Passenger Vehicles Act 1981; Goods Vehicles (Licensing of Operators) Act 1995; Crime (International Co-operation) Act 2003; Domestic Violence, Crime and Victims Act 2004; Railways Act 2005
Amended by	Sentencing Act 2020; Criminal Justice Act 2003 (Commencement No. 33) and Sentencing Act 2020 (Commencement No. 2) Regulations 2022; Judicial Review and Courts Act 2022 (Magistrates’ Court Sentencing Powers) Regulations 2023

Status: Amended

History of passage through Parliament

Text of statute as originally enacted

Revised text of statute as amended

The Road Safety Act 2006 (c. 49) is an act of the Parliament of the United Kingdom. The provisions contained in the act are designed to improve road safety and help achieve casualty reduction targets. The Government’s strategy for improving road safety was set out in the framework paper "Tomorrow's Roads – safer for everyone". The aim is to improve road safety and achieve casualty reduction targets of 40% of those killed and seriously injured and 50% reduction for children by 2010.

The act creates a new criminal offence of causing death by careless, or inconsiderate, driving. This offence was introduced because of public concern about deaths on the roads and the minimal sentence allowed under the law as it was before the introduction of the act. A person can now be sentenced summarily to 12 months (in England and Wales) or 6 months or a fine both or on indictment to 5 years or a fine or both. The act also increased the penalty for use of a hand-held mobile phone or similar device. Section 26 provides for an obligatory endorsement (with disqualification at the court's discretion) for the offence.

== Provisions ==
The provisions of the act cover:

- Drink driving
- Speeding
- New offences
- Penalties and enforcement
- Driver training
- Driver fatigue
- Driver and vehicle licensing
- Motor insurance

The act created exemptions from traffic restrictions including speed limits for certain cases such as donor vehicles.

== Commentary ==
Section 21 of the act introduced three new offences to the Road Traffic Act 1988, s.3ZB, namely, causing death by driving while (a) unlicensed, (b) disqualified, or (c) uninsured, though (b) was later omitted in 2015 to allow for the creation of new offences for causing death or serious injury by driving while disqualified.

The new offence has been the subject of much controversy as it was conventionally construed as meaning that a driver would be guilty of an offence purely if they caused death whilst meeting one of the three criteria, irrespective of their culpability. This would mean that, for example, even had an uninsured driver driven perfectly and caused death with their vehicle through no fault of their own (such as a pedestrian stepping in front of their vehicle, offering no time to react), that they would be guilty of a s.3ZB offence, purely by virtue of them being uninsured.

Rulings differed on s.3ZB, such as R v Williams [2010] EWCA Crim 2552, but ultimately the matter was ruled on by the Supreme Court in R v Hughes [2013] UKSC 56:

Juries should thus be directed that it is not necessary for the Crown to prove careless or inconsiderate driving, but that there must be something open to proper criticism in the driving of the defendant, beyond the mere presence of the vehicle on the road, and which contributed in some more than minimal way to the death.

== Section 61 - Commencement ==
The following orders have been made under this section:

- The Road Safety Act 2006 (Commencement No. 1) Order 2007 (S.I. 2007/237 (C.11))
- The Road Safety Act 2006 (Commencement No. 2) Order 2007 (S.I. 2007/2472 (C.91))
- The Road Safety Act 2006 (Commencement No. 3) Order 2008 (S.I. 2008/1864 (C.79))
- The Road Safety Act 2006 (Commencement No. 4) Order 2008 (S.I. 2008/1918 (C.86))
- The Road Safety Act 2006 (Commencement No. 5) Order 2008 (S.I. 2008/3164 (C.140))
- The Road Safety Act 2006 (Commencement No. 6) Order 2011 (S.I. 2011/19 (C.1))
- The Road Safety Act 2006 (Commencement No. 7) Order 2011 (S.I. 2011/1119 (C.45))
- The Road Safety Act 2006 (Commencement No. 1) (England and Wales) Order 2007 (S.I. 2007/466 (C.18))
- The Road Safety Act 2006 (Commencement No. 2) (England and Wales) Order 2007 (S.I. 2007/3492 (C.149))
- The Road Safety Act 2006 (Commencement No. 3) (England and Wales) Order 2008 (S.I. 2008/1862 (C.78))

== See also ==
- Road traffic safety
