= Cycling demonstration towns =

Cycling demonstration towns were part of a UK policy initiative to promote cycling that ran from 2005 to 2011.

== 2005: launch ==
In 2005, 6 towns in England were chosen to be cycling demonstration towns to promote cycling as a means of transport.

The decision was made by Cycling England, a body set up by the Department for Transport. Each year for three years the towns received £500,000 to spend on cycling (apart from Aylesbury which received £300,000).

In 2005 the cycling demonstration town status was awarded to:

- Aylesbury
- Brighton and Hove
- Darlington
- Derby
- Exeter
- Lancaster with Morecambe

== 2009: extension ==
In 2009 the following towns and cities were also awarded additional funding. At this time, the term 'cycle demonstration town' was changed to 'cycling town', reflecting that the initiative had moved from a pilot stage into full operation.

- Blackpool
- Bristol (cycling city)
- Cambridge
- Chester
- Colchester
- Leighton Buzzard with Linslade
- Shrewsbury
- Southend
- Southport
- Stoke-on-Trent
- Woking
- York

== 2011: cancellation ==
The programme ended in 2011 when Cycling England was disbanded.

== See also ==
- Outline of cycling
