= A New Deal for Transport: Better for everyone =

UK government report

A New Deal for Transport: Better for everyone was a white paper published by the United Kingdom government in 1997 setting out the government's transport policy.

== See also ==
- A New Deal for Trunk Roads in England
- Transport Direct Portal
