= Public Data Group =

British public body of data providing organisations from 2011 to 2015

The Public Data Group (PDG) was a grouping of data providing organisations owned by the UK government. It was formed in 2011 to improve the amount and quality of data publicly released, with the idea that making more data available would increase economic activity. The PDG was jointly set up by the Cabinet Office, the Department for Business, Innovation and Skills (BIS) and the Shareholder Executive.

The members of the PDG were:

- Companies House
- HM Land Registry
- Met Office
- Ordnance Survey

All the members of the PDG are trading funds of BIS.

The PDG was originally set up alongside the Data Strategy Board. This replaced the government's initial idea of a single Public Data Corporation, and enabled a split between the data provider and customer functions. The Data Strategy Board was later merged into the Public Sector Transparency Board.

The group's functions were integrated into a newly formed Department for Business, Innovation and Skills board following its final meeting in April 2015.

== See also ==
- Open Data in the United Kingdom
