= Ticketer =

Bus ticket machine manufacturer

Corvia Ltd
- Website: ticketer.com

Ticketer is the brand name for a range of electronic ticket machines provided by British company Corvia Ltd, primarily for usage on buses. The cloud-based system, first marketed on a small scale in 2008, has since developed into a rival to the three major ticket issuing systems used by bus companies throughout Britain.

== History and development ==
Ticketer was developed in the mid-2000s by two former employees of Wayfarer Transit Systems, a major supplier of public transport fare collection systems. (Note: Wayfarer Transit Systems was acquired by Parkeon in 2007 and is now called Parkeon Transit Ltd.) The company they set up dealt with small, independent bus operators, many of which used Wayfarer machines but wanted a simpler system which was easier to upgrade and configure in-house. In partnership with a mobile app developer, the company set up a prototype consisting of a thermal printer and a mobile computer running on the Android operating system. Independent operator Courtney Buses trialled this system during 2007 and 2008; a modified version was then designed and offered for sale under the Ticketer brand. In 2009 the newly formed company Corvia Ltd bought the rights to the system and began to market it widely, particularly to independent bus operators. The Windows CE operating system was used on the production machines.

In September 2018, private equity firm Tenzing invested in Ticketer. In 2019, Ticketer acquired FARA, a transport ticketing company in the Nordics. In 2020, Ticketer won a Queen's Awards for Enterprise in the Innovation category.

== Features ==
There are four parts to the Ticketer system's hardware, some are generic "off-the-shelf" products and some are custom developed components, components can be replaced individually if necessary. There is a touch-screen mobile computer with a built-in GPS beacon and modem that forms the control unit. This is connected to a custom communications and power board which provides connectivity to the thermal printer and card reader and barcode scanner and any additional bus hardware such as destination displays. A smartcard reader with ITSO compatibility is mounted alongside this. The built-in GPS means that the ticket machines double up as a tracking device, and they communicate back to the office via GPRS.

Corvia licenses out the Ticketer system per machine, allowing for an unlimited number of concurrent uses of the ticket machine. Ticketer requires no depot infrastructure to run; instead, it is run as a cloud-based software as a service (SaaS). Older ticket issuing systems required machines to be returned to a depot for data transfer—either wirelessly via a local area network or physically using an external module into which the machine would be docked.

Messages between the driver and depot can also be sent via the ticket machine and fares can easily be changed through an online portal. All configuration of fares, route data and graphical features on tickets (such as operator logos and customised advertisements—a feature developed in 2017) is done through a secure web-based interface accessible through any device with online access. Updates are downloaded to machines in real time via GPRS.

Since early 2017 Ticketer has fully supported contactless payment, and has been used on buses in order to introduce such technology. The system collects such payments from one customer into one large transaction, which cuts down on charges received when dealing with card payments. Around the same time, separate 2D barcode scanners were introduced and can be added on to the system, and barcodes have started to be printed on certain types of ticket.

In 2020, during the COVID-19 pandemic, Ticketer added a passenger counting feature, allowing operators to limit the number of passengers on a bus as a social distancing measure. Live passenger counts can be displayed on websites and apps.

In 2021, Ticketer piloted a road restriction alert feature, where the ticket machine alerts the driver about road restrictions such as low bridges, intended to help prevent bridge strikes.

== Products ==
There are four types of ticket machine sold under the Ticketer brand, with different hardware designs for different purposes. All hardware is manufactured in the United Kingdom, and the software is also developed in the UK. Tickets from each system are similar; most differences are attributable to the different printers used.

=== Ticketer Large ===
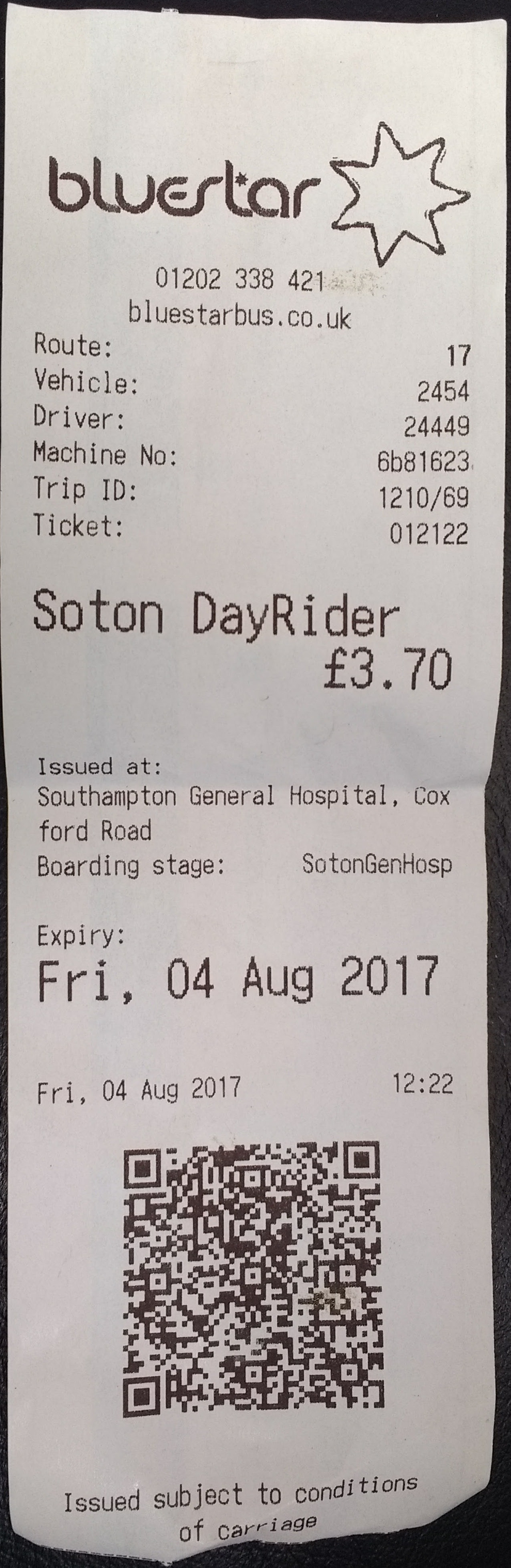
A bus ticket issued from a Ticketer Large ticket machine on a Bluestar bus. The QR code at the bottom allows the validity of the ticket to be digitally verified.

The "most popular" ticket machine, Ticketer Large, is designed for busy urban routes. It is a fixed point solution, with an ITSO-compliant smart card reader, printer and an electronic point of sale machine. This was the original Ticketer system; the other three machines, which differ only in their hardware, were developed by Corvia at the request of bus operators who had special requirements.

=== Ticketer Compact ===
A smaller version of the large system, Ticketer Compact, is designed for buses where passengers alight away from the driver. The printer is smaller and the card reader is mounted on top of it. There is no QR code reader. It is used especially by "community bus" operators which use small vehicles with non-standard interior layouts.

=== Handheld ETM ===
A completely mobile machine, named "Handheld ETM", was launched in 2014. It is an all-in-one solution designed for instances where fixed machines cannot be used, with the same functionality. The control unit, printer and card reader are mounted together in a portable case which can also be fixed inside a bus if necessary. Users include operators of occasional services or routes on which tickets would rarely be issued (such as school buses).

=== Ticketer in a Case ===
This is identical to the Ticketer Large but is mounted onto the side of a stainless steel case and can be operated by mains power. It is intended for semi-mobile solutions, such as where a machine may need to be used outside the bus.

== Usage ==
Until Ticketer was launched, most bus companies used ticket machines from one of three rival companies: Metric Group Ltd's Almex system, the Wayfarer system of Parkeon, and Vix Technology's Vix-ERG system. Most early users were small independent operators and municipally owned bus companies, but the placing of orders in early 2017 by the Oxford Bus Company and First Glasgow presaged the large transport groups such as FirstGroup and Go-Ahead Group adopting Ticketer more widely. It was adopted by both Oxford Bus Company (whose order included a Handheld ETM terminal for use at the Gloucester Green bus station in Oxford) and Thames Travel in late March 2017; and FirstGroup's Aberdeen and Hampshire & Dorset divisions adopted it in early April 2017 and late July 2017 respectively.

FirstGroup completed the implementation of the Ticketer machines in 2018. In 2019, Arriva completed their rollout of the Ticketer Standard machine, alongside all non-London Go-Ahead Group companies. Stagecoach Group began its rollout in 2026.

In 2023, Transport for Greater Manchester awarded Ticketer a contract to supply ticket machines for the region's new franchised Bee Network bus services from September 2023. The machines will be the next generation model, based on an Android tablet computer.

Reading Buses, an early adopter of Ticketer, switched to TransMach machines in 2025.

== Problems ==
In the case of Reading Buses, 11,500 pre-paid smart cards had to be reissued so they were able to work with Ticketer.

In 2025, problems with machines on buses.gg in Guernsey resulted in some passengers travelling for free.
