= Carriage (disambiguation) =

A carriage is a wheeled vehicle for carrying people, especially horse-drawn.

Carriage may also refer to:

== Vehicles ==
- Baby transport, also called a baby carriage (especially in North America) or pram, a four-wheeled pushed conveyance for reclining infants
- Gun carriage, an apparatus upon which a field gun is mounted for manoeuvring, firing, and transport
- Hose carriage, a wheeled vehicle for carrying a fire hose
- Railway carriage (especially in the British Isles and many Commonwealth countries), a railway vehicle (US: railroad car), part of a train for carrying people
- Undercarriage, the part of a moving vehicle that is underneath the main body of the vehicle, such as the:
  - Chassis, the undercarriage of a motor vehicle
  - Continuous track, the undercarriage of a tracked vehicle
  - Landing gear, the undercarriage of an aircraft or spacecraft

== Arts, entertainment, and media ==
- "The Carriage", an 1836 short story by Nikolai Gogol
- The Carriage (opera), a 2009 opera by Vyacheslav Kruglik, based on Gogol's story

== People ==
- Leigh Carriage, Australian vocalist, educator and songwriter

== Other uses ==
- Carriage - human posture, deportment behavior or bearing
- Carriage, retransmission of broadcast signals, as in carriage dispute (a disagreement over the right to "carry", that is, retransmit, a broadcaster's signal)
- Carriage, conveyance of passengers or goods, as in a contract of carriage
- Carriage, part of a lace machine
- Shopping cart, alternative name for a shopping carriage
- Staircase carriage, the timber or iron joist supporting a wooden staircase
- Typewriter carriage, the part of a typewriter which moves the paper past the printing mechanism

== See also ==
- Car (disambiguation)
- Carriage dispute
- Carriage of Passengers Act
- Carrier (disambiguation)
- Carry (disambiguation)
