= Transport Act 2000 =

Act of the Parliament of the United Kingdom

Transport Act 2000 (Note: Section 280.)
- Act of Parliament
- Parliament of the United Kingdom
- Long title: An Act to make provision about transport.
- Citation: 2000 c. 38
- Territorial extent: England and Wales; Scotland; Northern Ireland (in part); (Note: Section 279.)

Dates
- Royal assent: 30 November 2000
- Commencement: Various (Note: Section 275.)
Other legislation
Amends	House of Commons Disqualification Act 1975; Public Passenger Vehicles Act 1981; Civil Aviation Act 1982; Road Traffic Regulation Act 1984; Airports Act 1986; Channel Tunnel Act 1987; Railways Act 1993; Goods Vehicles (Licensing of Operators) Act 1995; Town and Country Planning (Scotland) Act 1997
Amended by	Capital Allowances Act 2001; Statute Law (Repeals) Act 2004; Railways Act 2005; Infrastructure Act 2015; Wales Act 2017; Bus Services Act 2017; Space Industry Act 2018; Digital Markets, Competition and Consumers Act 2024

Status: Amended

Text of statute as originally enacted

Revised text of statute as amended

The Transport Act 2000 (c. 38) is an act of the Parliament of the United Kingdom. It provided for a number of measures regarding transport in Great Britain. The Transport Act 2000 was the most comprehensive piece of transport legislation in over 30 years. It contained a wide range of new powers to improve local transport services. It was the first major change in the structure of the privatised railway system established under the Railways Act 1993.

== Provisions ==
=== Railways ===
The Director of Passenger Rail Franchising and the British Railways Board were both abolished and their functions transferred to the Strategic Rail Authority.

The act provides the framework for the railway byelaws.

=== Aviation ===
The act laid down the framework for the creation of a public-private partnership of National Air Traffic Services as a partial privatisation.

=== Roads ===
The act gives powers to local authorities to introduce congestion charges.

== Reception ==
The partial privatisation of National Air Traffic Services was criticise by the air traffic controllers' union, the Institution of Professionals, Managers and Specialists, who siad it could repeat the issues with previous privatisations.
