= Local transport plan =

Part of transport planning in England

Local transport plans, divided into full local transport plans (LTP) and local implementation plans for transport (LIP), are an important part of transport planning in England. Strategic transport authorities (county councils, unitary authorities, passenger transport authorities and London Borough councils), are expected to prepare them as forward-looking plans covering a number of years (typically five years), and present them to the Department for Transport (DfT). For instance, Oxfordshire County Council developed its second LTP in April 2006, and the LTP was implemented until March 2011.

Different arrangements apply to Scotland, Wales and Northern Ireland as transport is a devolved matter.

LTPs must:

- Outline the current baseline with regard to transport, accessibility and pollution
- Set out challenging but achievable objectives
- Set out the programme for achieving these objectives
- Outline 'bids' for funding from the DfT

Once an LTP is prepared it is submitted to the Secretary of State for Transport (England only); in London, the related LIP is submitted to the Mayor of London.

The LTP is a statutory transport plan deriving from the Transport Act 2000; its relative the LIP is much the same but derives from the Greater London Authority Act 1999. Both pieces of legislation were passing through the House of Commons and Lords at about the same time and sought to establish a statutory requirement for local transport plans on the basis that had been set out in the Government's White Paper The Future of Transport.

The LTP and LIP is subject to a strategic environmental assessment that is undertaken in accordance with UK regulations that are based on EU regulations.

The plan is subject to public consultation, though not to an 'examination in public'. It provides the highway, local traffic, and transport authority with an opportunity to set out studies of, and make recommendations to improve, locations of trip attractors (trip destinations) and residential locations (trip origins), along with a range of demand management and public transport measures as well as supply measures, to provide for balanced use of road space, public transport integration and appropriate patterns and forms of development.

Although many of the first round of LTPs (2001–2006) contained little analysis and planning, being little different from bidding documents that councils had previously grown used to writing to secure central government funds, it is anticipated that the second round (2006–2011) will establish the statutory transport plan as a significant and thoughtful process that makes a thorough contribution to urban and rural planning. The name of these documents is frequently abbreviated by the local authorities to LPT2. Used to their full potential, a Council is able to set out evidence-based policy and analysis and some complementary expenditure programmes, for transport and mobility matters, along with associated environmental and health considerations and targets, that will assist the wider aims of land-use planning for sustainable development.

In the UK, a local transport plan can be used as a 'material consideration' when a local planning authority or the Secretary of State determines a planning application. Ideally, the plan should be prepared as advice to the local planning authority on highway and transport matters, in particular how these should be considered in the local context so as to meet national integrated transport targets and priorities within the context of sustainable development, such as balanced use of roadspace between public and private transport of all modes and forms. An LPA's decisions must normally be taken in accordance with its own land-use or spatial plan and official planning guidance; however, something clearly laid out in a good, well justified LTP, could provide an LPA or the Secretary of State with a sufficient material justification to decide otherwise, on a case-by-case basis.
