= Public Passenger Vehicles Act 1981 =

Act of the Parliament of the United Kingdom

Public Passenger Vehicles Act 1981 (Note: Section 89(1).)
- Act of Parliament
- Parliament of the United Kingdom
- Long title: An Act to consolidate certain enactments relating to public passenger vehicles.
- Citation: 1981 c. 14
- Territorial extent: England and Wales; Scotland; (Note: Section 89(4). Section 25(2) does not extend to Scotland (section 89(3)).)

Dates
- Royal assent: 15 April 1981
- Commencement: 30 October 1981 (Note: Section 89(2). The Public Passenger Vehicles Act 1981 (Commencement) Order 1981 (SI 1981/1387).)

Other legislation
- Amends: Energy Act 1976; See § Repealed enactments
- Repeals/revokes: See § Repealed enactments
- Amended by: Forgery and Counterfeiting Act 1981; Transport Act 1981; Civic Government (Scotland) Act 1982; Transport Act 1982; Road Traffic (Driving Licences) Act 1983; Traffic Areas (Reorganisation) (No. 2) Order 1983; Road Traffic Regulation Act 1984; London Regional Transport Act 1984; Roads (Scotland) Act 1984; Police and Criminal Evidence Act 1984; Metropolitan Traffic Area (Transfer of Functions) Order 1984; Local Government Act 1985; Transport Act 1985; Operation of Public Service Vehicles (Partnership) Regulations 1986; Road Traffic Act 1988; Road Traffic (Consequential Provisions) Act 1988; Road Traffic (Driver Licensing and Information Systems) Act 1989; Traffic Areas (Reorganisation) Order 1990; Public Service Vehicle Operators (Qualifications) Regulations 1990; Road Traffic Act 1991; Transport and Works Act 1992; Statute Law (Repeals) Act 1993; Local Government etc. (Scotland) Act 1994; Deregulation and Contracting Out Act 1994; Goods Vehicles (Licensing of Operators) Act 1995; Road Transport (Passenger Vehicles Cabotage) Regulations 1999; Public Service Vehicle Operators (Qualifications) Regulations 1999; Transport Act 2000; Criminal Justice Act 2003; Enterprise Act 2002 (Insolvency) Order 2003; Statute Law (Repeals) Act 2004; Mental Capacity Act 2005; Inquiries Act 2005; Road Safety Act 2006; Education and Inspections Act 2006; Armed Forces Act 2006; Local Transport Act 2008; Learner Travel (Wales) Measure 2008; Local Democracy, Economic Development and Construction Act 2009; Road Vehicles (Approval) (Consequential Amendments) Regulations 2009; Transfer of Functions (Transport Tribunal and Appeal Panel) Order 2009; Local Education Authorities and Children's Services Authorities (Integration of Functions) Order 2010; Road Transport Operator Regulations 2011; Road Vehicles (Powers to Stop) Regulations 2011; Treaty of Lisbon (Changes in Terminology) Order 2011; Criminal Justice and Licensing (Scotland) Act 2010 (Consequential Provisions and Modifications) Order 2011; Tribunals, Courts and Enforcement Act 2007 (Consequential Amendments) Order 2012; Rights of Passengers in Bus and Coach Transport (Exemptions and Enforcement) Regulations 2013; Local Transport Act 2008 (Traffic Commissioners) (Consequential Amendments) Order 2013; Road Safety Act 2006 (Consequential Amendments) Order 2015; Enterprise and Regulatory Reform Act 2013 (Consequential Amendments) (Bankruptcy) and the Small Business, Enterprise and Employment Act 2015 (Consequential Amendments) Regulations 2016; Wales Act 2017; Operation of Public Service Vehicles (Partnership) (Amendment) Regulations 2017; Common Rules for Access to the International Market for Coach and Bus Services (Amendment etc.) (EU Exit) Regulations 2019; Sentencing Act 2020; Road Vehicles (Approval) Regulations 2020; Public Service Pensions and Judicial Offices Act 2022; Judicial Review and Courts Act 2022; Road Vehicles and Non-Road Mobile Machinery (Type-Approval) (Amendment and Transitional Provisions) (EU Exit) Regulations 2022; Levelling-up and Regeneration Act 2023; Road Transport (International Passenger Services) (Amendment) Regulations 2024

Status: Amended

Text of statute as originally enacted

Revised text of statute as amended

Text of the Public Passenger Vehicles Act 1981 as in force today (including any amendments) within the United Kingdom, from legislation.gov.uk.

The Public Passenger Vehicles Act 1981 (c. 14) is an act of the Parliament of the United Kingdom that consolidated enactments relating to public passenger vehicles in Great Britain.

== Provisions ==
=== Repealed enactments ===
Section 88(3) of the act repealed 13 enactments, listed in schedule 8 to the act.

Citation	Short title	Extent of repeal
8 & 9 Eliz. 2. c. 16	Road Traffic Act 1960	Part III.
8 & 9 Eliz. 2. c. 16	Road Traffic Act 1960	In section 232(1), paragraph (a).
8 & 9 Eliz. 2. c. 16	Road Traffic Act 1960	Section 239.
8 & 9 Eliz. 2. c. 16	Road Traffic Act 1960	In section 247(2) the words "except offences under section 148(2)".
8 & 9 Eliz. 2. c. 16	Road Traffic Act 1960	Section 252.
8 & 9 Eliz. 2. c. 16	Road Traffic Act 1960	In section 257(1) the words from "and the expressions" to end of the subsection.
8 & 9 Eliz. 2. c. 16	Road Traffic Act 1960	Section 260.
8 & 9 Eliz. 2. c. 16	Road Traffic Act 1960	In section 263, in subsection (1) the word "III" and subsection (2).
8 & 9 Eliz. 2. c. 16	Road Traffic Act 1960	In section 265, subsection (1) and in subsection (2) the words from the beginning to "Part III of this Act and."
8 & 9 Eliz. 2. c. 63	Road Traffic and Roads Improvement Act 1960	Section 24.
8 & 9 Eliz. 2. c. 63	Road Traffic and Roads Improvement Act 1960	The Schedule.
10 & 11 Eliz. 2. c. 46	Transport Act 1962	In Schedule 2, in Part I the entry relating to section 157 of the Road Traffic Act 1960.
10 & 11 Eliz. 2. c. 59	Road Traffic Act 1962	In Schedule 4, the amendment of section 130 of the Road Traffic Act 1960.
1968 c. 73	Transport Act 1968	In section 35, subsection (3).
1968 c. 73	Transport Act 1968	In section 130(6), paragraph (c).
1968 c. 73	Transport Act 1968	In section 145, subsection (2).
1968 c. 73	Transport Act 1968	In Schedule 10, in Part I the entry relating to section 123 of the Road Traffic Act 1960 and in Part II the entry relating to section 123 of the Road Traffic Act 1960.
1969 c. 35	Transport (London) Act 1969	In section 24, subsections (1) to (4).
1972 c. 11	Superannuation Act 1972	In Schedule 6, the amendment of section 126 of the Road Traffic Act 1960.
1974 c. 50	Road Traffic Act 1974	In section 10(7) the words "the amendments of Part III of the 1960 Act specified in Schedule 2 to this Act."
1974 c. 50	Road Traffic Act 1974	In section 21(1) paragraph (a) and the words "Part I or" and "as the case may require".
1974 c. 50	Road Traffic Act 1974	In Schedule 2, paragraph 2.
1974 c. 50	Road Traffic Act 1974	In Schedule 5, Part I.
1974 c. 50	Road Traffic Act 1974	In Schedule 6, paragraph 2.
1975 c. 53	Public Service Vehicles (Arrest of Offenders) Act 1975	In section 1 the words from "regulations having effect" to "public service vehicles) or of".
1975 c. 53	Public Service Vehicles (Arrest of Offenders) Act 1975	Section 2(2).
1977 c. 21	Passenger Vehicles (Experimental Areas) Act 1977	The whole act.
1977 c. 25	Minibus Act 1977	The whole act.
1978 c. 55	Transport Act 1978	Sections 5 and 7.
1978 c. 55	Transport Act 1978	In section 24(2), the definition of "the 1960 Act". In Schedule 2, paragraph 5.
1980 c. 34	Transport Act 1980	Sections 1 to 31.
1980 c. 34	Transport Act 1980	In section 32, subsections (1) to (4).
1980 c. 34	Transport Act 1980	Section 33.
1980 c. 34	Transport Act 1980	Section 36.
1980 c. 34	Transport Act 1980	In section 37, subsection (1).
1980 c. 34	Transport Act 1980	Sections 38 to 41.
1980 c. 34	Transport Act 1980	In section 42— (a) in subsection (2), paragraph (a) and sub-paragraphs (i), (ii) and (iv) of paragraph (b); and (b) subsections (3) and (4).
1980 c. 34	Transport Act 1980	In section 43, subsection (2).
1980 c. 34	Transport Act 1980	Section 44.
1980 c. 34	Transport Act 1980	Schedules 1 to 3.
1980 c. 34	Transport Act 1980	In Schedule 4, the entries relating to sections 144, 146, 147 and 157 of the Road Traffic Act 1960.
1980 c. 34	Transport Act 1980	In Schedule 5, Part I and in Part II the paragraphs amending the Transport (London) Act 1969, the Road Traffic Act 1974, the Passenger Vehicles (Experimental Areas) Act 1977, the Minibus Act 1977 and the Transport Act 1978.
