= Mapumental =

Web-based interactive isochrone map

- Interactive isochrone map on Mapumental.com
- Owner: mySociety
- Creators: Chris Lightfoot, Francis Irving, Matthew Somerville, Duncan Parkes, Steve Day, Dave Arter
- Website: mapumental.com
- Launched: 2006
- Written in: Perl

Mapumental is a web-based application for displaying journeys in terms of how long they take, rather than by distance, a technique also known as isochrone or geospatial mapping. It was developed by British organisation mySociety but was withdrawn in 2020.

Users input one or more postcodes and Mapumental displays a map overlaid with coloured bands, each of which represent a set increment of time. Initial work on the project was done by Chris Lightfoot, using open data from Railplanner, Transport Direct and the Transport for London Journey Planner.

It was built with support from Channel 4iP, the former public service arm of British TV broadcaster Channel 4. The software Mapumental runs on is licensed under the GNU Affero General Public License.

Mapumental can be combined with other data sets, for example, property prices and ‘scenicness’ data (see ScenicOrNot, below). It is now provided as a commercial service by mySociety to clients such as the Fire Protection Association.
