= CycleStreets =

British cycle journey planner

- Formation: 2009; 17 years ago
- Founder: Simon Nuttall; Martin Lucas-Smith
- Type: Nonprofit
- Location: Cambridge, United Kingdom
- Origins: Cambridge Cycle Campaign Journey Planner
- Region served: United Kingdom
- Services: Cycle journey planning
- Methods: OpenStreetMap
- Official language: English
- Funding: Self-funding; Donations
- Website: cyclestreets.net

CycleStreets is a British nonprofit that provides a free-to-use national cycle journey planner for the United Kingdom. The planner uses OpenStreetMap data for routing, Shuttle Radar Topography Mission for height data and official postcode data.

As of August 2015, the site has planned over 45 million itineraries.

== History ==
CycleStreets was developed by Simon Nuttall and Martin Lucas-Smith, both Cambridge-based and both frequent cyclists.

CycleStreets is a development of the Cambridge Cycle Campaign Journey Planner, which was launched in 2006. CycleStreets itself was launched on 20 March 2009; which was by co-incidence the same day that it was announced that the Transport Direct Portal was about to introduce cycle routing for a small number of trial locations including Manchester.

In June 2009, a feature to plan circular routes was added and the project was featured in The Guardian newspaper. In August 2009 functionality was added to export routes for use in GPS device and the ability to route via ferry services and then in October 2009 the project released elevation profiles and 'Balanced routes'.

In December 2009, CycleStreets was 'Highly Commended' in the ACT Travelwise annual awards.

By January 2010, CycleStreets had planned 100,000 journeys.

In February 2010, the ability to share short video clips was added and then in March 2010 CycleStreets added Google Streetview images to the route description pages and a post code look-up function. They reported their 100,000th journey plan itinerary the same month.

== Development ==
In 2007, during the development of CycleStreets, Simon Nuttall and Martin Lucas-Smith advised Transport Direct on the CycleNetXChange data exchange standard for cycle route data which was later used in the Transport Direct Portal cycle journey planner.

In July 2009, CycleStreets was presented at the OpenStreetMap annual 'State of the Map' Conference In September 2009, Martin Lucas Smith of CycleStreets presented the project at the School of Cartography Summer School.

The project held its first 'Developer Day' in March 2010, where technical issues relating to the project were discussed and there was a session on cycle routing at WhereCampEU.

== Funding ==
CycleStreets is a nonprofit project, and has been largely self-funded. It has received grants from the following organisations (in chronological order):

- Cycling Scotland (£5,000): To develop a version of the site for Edinburgh, which Cycling Scotland are now promoting as a Scotland-wide system
- Cambridge City Council — Cambridge Sustainable City project (£3,200) in February 2010.
- Co-op Community Fund (£1,000) in March 2010.

The project has also benefited from a number of donations in kind, including geographic information donated in OpenStreetMap.
