= Association of Transport Coordinating Officers =

The Association of Transport Coordinating Officers (often known by its acronym "ATCO") was formed in 1974, joining initially senior Public Transport officers of local government around the UK. Although limited to 'lead officers', the organisation spread quickly from just upper tier county authorities to all transport authorities around the UK.

The Association is now in its 39th year, holding annual conferences around the UK, a winter training event and AGM in London and localised support events.

== Benchmarking Survey ==
ATCO has been known for its ability to obtain a single source of bench marking data for a range of indicators which represent the (often diverse) services which local authority passenger transport units provide and are considered to be the key to understanding the pressures within Local Authorities. It has carried out these surveys since 2006.

=== Price, Expenditure and Competition Survey ===
ATCO has since 1998 monitored the prices of contracts around the country for local bus services provided by the local authorities and school transport contracts. It is used by numerous government departments to support work on-going.

== Traveline ==
Traveline, as represented by a non-voting member, has recently requested a member of ATCO join its board.

Traveline also uses the ATCO CIF files as part of its data services, the specification for which can be found at its website. The files, used to transfer information, is based on the rail Common Interface File system.
