= GovTalk =

British e-government initiative

GovTalk was a UK government initiative sponsored by the Cabinet Office, designed to encourage efficient government through the use of the Internet and other modern electronic technologies. It included guidelines and advice on best practices for the use of technology, metadata standards, a repository of XML schemas, and a process for consulting on new schemas to cover specific areas of government.

== See also ==
- e-GMS
