= NaPTAN =

Dataset of public transport access points in the UK

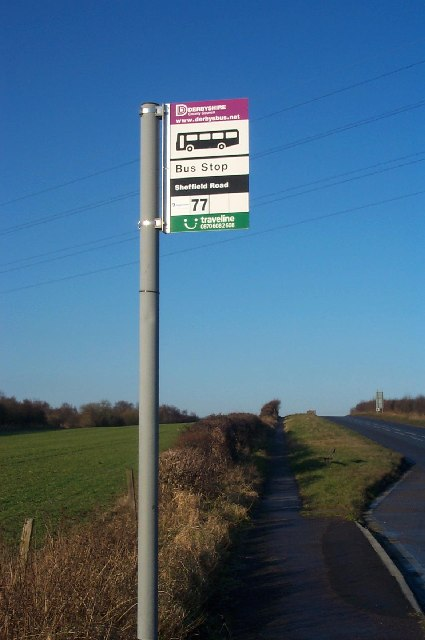
A bus stop in Creswell, Derbyshire, one of thousands of locations in the NaPTAN dataset.

The National Public Transport Access Node (NaPTAN) database is a UK nationwide system for uniquely identifying all the points of access to public transport in the UK. The dataset is closely associated with the National Public Transport Gazetteer.

Every UK railway station, coach terminus, airport, ferry terminal, bus stop, taxi rank or other place where public transport can be joined or left is allocated a unique NaPTAN identifier. The relationship of the stop to a City, Town, Village or other locality can be indicated through an association with elements of the National Public Transport Gazetteer.

There is a CEN standardisation initiative, Identification of Fixed Objects In Public Transport ('IFOPT'), to develop NaPTAN concepts into a European standard for stop identification as an extension to Transmodel, the European standard for Public Transport information.

== Purpose of NaPTAN ==
The ability to identify and locate stops in relation to topography, both consistently and economically, is fundamental to modern computer based systems that provide passenger information and manage public transport networks. Stop data is needed by journey planners, scheduling systems, real-time systems, for transport planning, performance monitoring, and for many other purposes. Digitalising a nation's public transport stops is an essential step in creating a national information infrastructure.

In the UK NaPTAN enabled the creation of the Transport Direct Portal, a UK nationwide system for multi-modal journey planning. NaPTAN also underpins TransXChange, the UK standard for bus schedules, which is used for the Electronic Registration of Bus Services.

== NaPTAN Components ==
NaPTAN comprises several distinct elements

- A data model, based on Transmodel.
- A data exchange format, specified as an XML schema
- A central data store used to aggregate and distribute stop data from different UK regions.
- A process for different stakeholders to contribute, validate and share data.
- A website to access the data.
- A simple API that can be used to download the data

NaPTAN identifiers are designed to be used within the UK's Digital National Framework a system of unique persistent reference for shareable information resources of all types managed by the Ordnance Survey.

NaPTAN includes on a related standard, the UK National Public Transport Gazetteer.

=== The NaPTAN Database ===
The National Public Transport Access Node dataset has information on all UK public transport stops. Stops are submitted by PTEs to a central authority which consolidates the stops and distributes them back to users. There are currently 380,000 active stop points.

NaPTAN is maintained by the Department of Transport.

=== The NaPTAN XML Schema ===
NaPTAN data is described by a NaPTAN XML Schema. This can be used to describe NaPTAN data when exchanging it between systems as XML documents. It is versioned so that different generations of data can be managed.

=== NaPTAN Conceptual Model ===
The NPTG & NaPTAN data conform to a family of consistent, interlocking data models. The models are described in the NPTG & NaPTAN Schema Guide in UML notation.

== NaPTAN Stops ==
=== NaPTAN Stop Numbering ===
NaPTAN identifiers are a systematic way of identifying of all UK points of access to public transport or "Stop points").

- Every UK rail station, bus and coach terminus, airport, ferry terminal, individual bus stop, tram stop, and taxi rank is allocated a unique NaPTAN Identifier.
- For large interchanges & termini, NaPTAN points identify the entrances from the public thoroughfare – one identifier is distinguished as the main entrance. Platforms may also be individually identified
- Every local authority has been allocated a unique prefix for their stop numbering, this ensures that stop numbers cannot be duplicated, in addition there are national number prefixes - 900 for coach stops, 910 for railway stations, 920 for airports, 930 for ferry terminals and 940 for metro and tram stops, the national stop numbers are created centrally and not by local authorities.
- In England stop details are provided by 87 local authorities and are prefixed with numbers ranging between 010 and 490.
- In Wales stop details are provided by 22 local authorities and are prefixed with numbers ranging between 511 and 582.
- In Scotland stop details are provided by 32 local authorities and are prefixed with numbers ranging between 601 and 690.

=== NaPTAN Stop Descriptors ===
NaPTAN stop points have a number of text descriptor elements associated with them: not just a name, but also additional labels and distinguishing identifiers that will help users to recognise them. These elements can be combined in different ways to provide presentations of names useful for many different contexts, for example on maps, stop finders, timetables etc., and on mobile devices.

- Stop points may have a common name, short name, landmark, street, asset code, etc.
- Stop points may also have alternative names, for example for aliases for different national languages.
- Stop names may have a qualifier to distinguish them from other stops within the same group of stops.

The Purpose of these descriptors is to create an iterative level of detail i.e. country – county – locality – street – name – identifier. All of this information should be included but it is up to the user of the data to decide how much data is relevant for the task in hand.

=== Stop Locations ===
Every NaPTAN point includes geospatial coordinates specified in Ordnance Survey National Grid format, and as WGS84 latitude and longitude pairs where these are provided by local authorities. This allows NaPTAN points to be projected on maps and to be associated with other information layers.

== National Public Transport Gazetteer ==
The National Public Transport Gazetteer (NPTG) is closely associated with the NaPTAN dataset and contains topographic details of every city, town, village, and suburb in Great Britain. This dataset is based on usage of names, rather than legal definitions, and so includes local informal names for places as well as their official names.It is also a frame of reference for other UK Public Transport Information schemas such as JourneyWeb. Gazetteers are used for electronic journey planners to associate stops and destinations with named urban settlements. They are also useful for disambiguating different places with the same name.

== See also ==
- TransXChange
- IFOPT
- Journey Planner
- Integrated Transport Network
