= TransXChange =

XML file format for digital timetable

TransXChange is a UK national XML based data standard for the interchange of bus route and timetable information between bus operators, the Vehicle and Operator Services Agency, local authorities and passenger transport executives, and others involved in the provision of passenger information.

The format is a UK national de facto standard sponsored by the UK Department of Transport. The standard is part of a family of coherent transport related XML standards that follow UK GovTalk guidelines and are based on the CEN Transmodel conceptual model.

Although TransXChange is currently used mainly to exchange bus timetables, it may also be used for schedules for rail and other modes.

== History ==
TransXChange is intended as a successor to the widely used ATCO-CIF format for bus timetables and was developed as a modernised representation of ATCO-CIF content, using an XML representation based on the Transmodel Reference model for Public Transport.

- Version 1.0 versions of TransXchange were developed in 2000-2001 and used in pilot projects.
- Version 2.0 of the TransXChange standards released in April 2005. 2.1 was a major rewrite to meet additional requirements and harmonise with eGOV standards. It introduced a modular structure of packages in particular to use the UK NaPTAN and National Public Transport Gazetteer or NPTG standard to define the names and location of stops.
- Version 2.1 was released in February 2006 and is now supported by most UK suppliers of Public Transport Scheduling software. Version 2.1 has now been adopted as the baseline standard for Electronic Bus Service Registration conducted by the UK Vehicle and Operator Services Agency (VOSA), and as the general standard to which all related developments are expected to comply. 2.1 was accompanied by an enhanced TransXChange Publisher tool which can plot a bus route on a map.
- In 2007 an open source tool known as TransXChange2GoogleTransit to output a TransXChange schedule in General Transit Feed Specification (GTFS), the format used by Google Transit, was released.
- Version 2.2 was released in 2008.
- Version 2.4 was released in 2012
- Version 2.5 was released in 2013
- TXC PTI Profile v1.1 was released in 2020
- TXC PTI Profile v1.1.A was released in 2021

TransXChange is supported by all main UK suppliers of bus timetable systems and has also been used to exchange data for metro and other modes.

== Scope ==
TransXChange provides a rich model based representation of a bus timetable that can be used for a wide variety of purposes. TransXChange documents can be used to exchange the following information:

- Bus schedules including stops, routes, departures times/frequencies, operational notes, and maps. Routes may have complex topologies such as circular routes, cloverleaf and lollipops, and complex workings such as short working and express patterns. Connections with other services can also be described;
- The days on which the services run, including availability on public holidays and other exceptions;
- Term times and holidays of Schools, Local Educational Authorities and other organisations serviced by a bus service;
- Details of the Statutory Registration of the Service with a Traffic Area Office, including any Short Notice Registration details;
- Information about the Bus Operators providing the service;
- Additional operational information, including fare stages, positioning runs, garages, layovers, duty crews, useful for Automatic Vehicle Location or AVL and on-board ticketing systems.

=== TransXChange Schemas ===
TransXChange comprises:

- Two XML schemas: There are two almost identical schemas, with differences only as to the constraints on mandatory elements:
1. A Registration schema, intended for Electronic Bus Service Registration, in which registration details are mandatory.
2. A General Purpose Schema for which registration details are optional.
- A user guide, describing the TransXChange model including UML diagrams and descriptions of all the elements and attributes.
- A set of example documents illustrating the use of TransXChange features.
- A TransXChange Publisher tool.

Each version of TransXChange is versioned in line with UK GovTalk guidelines.

== TransXChange Publisher ==
TransXChange is accompanied by a free tool, the TransXChange Publisher, which renders a TransXChange document into a human readable format, matrix and route map. PDF and html formats are supported.

== Future development ==
Addition modules are envisaged to cover ticketing and fares through the proposed FareXChange standard. TransXChange can also be used for other modes of transport - it is already used for metro and tram systems, route and timetable data.

== See also ==
- Bus transport in the United Kingdom
- General Transit Feed Specification (GTFS)
- Intermodal Journey Planner
- NaPTAN
- Service Interface for Real Time Information (SIRI)
- Transmodel
- Vehicle and Operator Services Agency
