= Confederation of Passenger Transport =

Advocacy group representing operators of British buses and coaches

- Formation: 30 August 1974
- Headquarters: 22 Greencoat Place
- Location: London, England
- Coordinates: 51.4947°N 0.1372°W
- Region served: United Kingdom
- Staff: 25 (2022)
- Website: www.cpt-uk.org

The Confederation of Passenger Transport (CPT) is an advocacy group and trade association representing operators of buses and coaches in the United Kingdom. As well as providing services to its members, it acts as a primary voice of the industry to the government on national and international legislation, local regulations, operational practices and engineering standards.

== History ==
The Confederation of Passenger Transport was formed in 1974 following the forming of passenger transport authorities, and other changes in the industry following the Transport Act 1968. It was the successor to the Passenger Vehicle Operators' Association, the Scottish Road Passenger Transport Association and the PRTA.
