= Transport Direct Portal =

Former online journey planner

Screenshot from the Transport Direct Portal

The Transport Direct Portal was a distributed Internet-based multi-modal journey planner providing information for travel in England, Wales and Scotland. It was managed by Transport Direct, a division of the Department for Transport. It was launched in 2004 and was operated by a consortium led by Atos and later enhanced to include a cycle journey planning function. The portal closed on 30 September 2014 after an announcement earlier that month.

== Operation ==
The portal offered a door-to-door journey planner which allowed the user to compare different transport modes including car, rail, bus and coach, air, walking and cycling. Specific features included:

- Routing using one or more modes: local bus, coaches, rail and walking.
- Cycle journey planning for 32 towns and counties.
- Car routing that takes into account likely traffic congestion based on past experience and can route to a suitable car park or park and ride site.
- Internal flight routing in Great Britain, with links to the operator to price your journey.
- Rail-only all-day journey plans with the ability to search for the train journeys with the cheaper fares.
- Compare journeys opportunities between selected major British cities and transport interchanges by different modes.
- Live travel and traffic news – travel and traffic incidents – both planned and unplanned – as well as real-time train running information.
- Real-time train running information that can be accessed from a Mobile phone and an Interactive television.
- A white label version which was available through (BBC and Visit Britain).
- An exposed Web service (Service-oriented architecture) was used by a number of partners including UK Department for Work and Pensions.
- Links back to the service are provided from Google Transit and National Rail Enquiries.
- Estimation of CO_{2} emissions for your journey, whether by car or public transport.
- A batch journey planner to support the creation of Travel Plans.
- A mobile friendly version of the door to door planner was added in August 2013.

The planner used a distributed approach based on the Traveline journey planners for each Traveline region with the JourneyWeb protocol being used to manage journeys between Traveline regions. Each Journey Planner integrated information from many different transport operators and sources.

== Cost and usage ==
The 10 millionth user session took place on 1 December 2006 with the number of session steadily growing over time; 1.126 million user sessions were recorded for August 2007. By March 2010, a total of 70 million user sessions have been provided, with the total uses by the start of 2011 being 81 million thus being used over 11 million times in a year.

Operation of the Portal cost £5.9 million for the period April 2006 to March 2007. The total cost of the Transport Direct Programme was £55 million to March 2007.

== History ==
Transport Direct established the Traveline organisation in 2000 to develop a number of regional call centres, initially using paper timetables, and to provide a national public transport information service. It was divided into 11 different areas (regions) each of which develop computerised journey planners.

Transport Direct wanted to be able to provide a single point of access to this service and a contract to develop the Transport Direct Portal was awarded in 2002 to Atos Origin which would provide an integrated point of access to the regional journey planners using the JourneyWeb protocol which was developed for the purpose.

Following a two-year period of development and testing and was officially launched by Alistair Darling, the Secretary of State for Transport on 31 December 2004. At the time it was claimed to be the first national door-to-door travel to provide details of both Public transport and car for journeys. By way of historical comparison, Google Maps was not launched until early the following year. Google Transit was released in Google Labs in December 2005 and was not integrated into Google Maps until October 2007.

A number of issues with the underlying data that were picked up by the national media resulting in poor results.

During 2005, new service delivery channels (Mobile phone, Personal digital assistant and Interactive television) were introduced. Functionality to find cheaper rail fares and a day trip planner were added as well as information about the location of car parks and other points of interest.

The product was further enhanced in 2006 to accommodate the wider range of services and provide easier access from the home page to the core door-to-door and live travel news services.

In March 2009, Transport Direct added cycle journey planning to the Portal for Manchester and Merseyside.

The cycle data collected for Transport Direct was subsequently converted into an OpenStreetMap-compatible format. This was released on GitHub by CycleStreets in January 2018.

Usage of the Transport Direct Portal grew significantly since its launch and 2008 was operating at an annual rate of about 18.5 million user sessions. By 2014 it had served more than 160 million travel information requests.

The Department for Transport reviewed Transport Direct in 2014 and decided to close the portal as there are plenty of equivalent services provided by the private sector.
