= Service Interface for Real Time Information =

XML protocol for exchanging real-time public transport information

The Service Interface for Real Time Information or SIRI is an XML protocol to allow distributed computers to exchange real-time information about public transport services and vehicles.

The protocol is a CEN norm, developed originally as a technical standard with initial participation by France, Germany (Verband Deutscher Verkehrsunternehmen), Scandinavia, and the UK (RTIG)

SIRI is based on the CEN Transmodel abstract model for public transport information, and comprises a general purpose model, and an XML schema for public transport information. A SIRI White Paper was created in 2008 to develop the protocol.

== Scope ==
CEN SIRI allows pairs of server computers to exchange structured real-time information about schedules, vehicles, and connections, together with informational messages related to the operation of the services. The information can be used for many different purposes, for example:

- To provide real-time departure from stop information for display on stops, internet and mobile delivery systems;
- To provide real-time progress information about individual vehicles;
- To manage the movement of buses roaming between areas covered by different servers;
- To manage the synchronisation of guaranteed connections between fetcher and feeder services;
- To exchange planned and real-time timetable updates;
- To distribute status messages about the operation of the services;
- To provide performance information to operational history and other management systems.

CEN SIRI includes a number of optional capabilities. Different countries may specify a country profile of the subset of SIRI capabilities that they wish to adopt.

== Architecture ==
The CEN SIRI standard has two distinct components:

1. SIRI Common Protocol Framework. The Framework provides a uniform architecture for defining data messages either as request/response pairs or as publish/subscribe services. The payload content model is separated from the messaging aspects so that the same payload content can be used in both request and subscription services and the same common messaging components can be used for all the different functional services. Common functions for subscription management, service monitoring, content level authentication, etc are provided.
2. SIRI Functional Services. The SIRI specification specifies a number of distinct functional services, each designed for the exchange of a specific type of public transport data, all using the same protocol framework and basing their payload content on the Transmodel conceptual model. Additional functional services may be added that use the same framework but different payload content models to cover additional services.

=== CEN SIRI Functional Services ===
SIRI V1.0 defined eight functional services:

- SIRI-PT: Planned Timetable service: Allows the exchange of the planned timetable for a public transport service along a route.
- SIRI-ET: Estimated Timetable service: Allows the exchange of the real-time timetable for a public transport service along a route.
- SIRI-ST: Stop Timetable service: Allows the exchange of the planned arrivals and departures at a stop of public transport services.
- SIRI-SM: Stop Monitoring service: Allows the exchange of the real-time arrivals and departures at a stop of public transport services.
- SIRI-VM: Vehicle Monitoring service: Allows the exchange of the real-time positions of public transport vehicles.
- SIRI-CT: Connection Timetable service: Allows the exchange of the planned connections of public transport services at a stop.
- SIRI-CM: Connection Monitoring service: Allows the exchange of the real-time connections of public transport services at a stop, taking into account delays.
- SIRI-GM: General Messaging service: Allows the exchange of the simple messages relating to public transport services.

Two further functional services have been added as part of the CEN SIRI specification;

- SIRI-FM: Facility Monitoring service: Allows the exchange of the real-time status of facilities at a stop such as lifts, escalators, etc.
- SIRI-SX: Situation Exchange service: Allows the exchange of the structured messages relating to public transport services and networks.

=== Other CEN Standards that use the SIRI Common Protocol Framework ===
The CEN SIRI Common Protocol Framework can be used by other standards to define their own Functional Services. Two CEN standards that do this are:

- The CEN NeTEx specification for Public Transport reference data uses the CEN SIRI Common Protocol Framework to define a SIRI based exchange service to exchange any type of NeTEx data element within a frame.
- The CEN Open API for distributed journey planning uses the CEN SIRI Common Protocol Framework to define a protocol for journey planning.

== Current version & Documentation ==
Version 2.0 of SIRI , representing the CEN documents as published, is currently available as a set of XSD files packaged as a zip file .

- CEN TS 15531-1:2015 - Part 1: Context and framework.
- CEN TS 15531-2:2015 - Part 2: Communications infrastructure.
- CEN TS 15531-3:2015 - Part 3: Functional service interfaces (covering the SIRI-PT, SIRI-ET, SIRI-ST, SIRI-SM, SIRI-VM, SIRI-CT, SIRI-CM, and SIRI-GM functional services).
- CEN/TS 15531-4:2011 - Part 4: Functional service interfaces - Facility Monitoring.
- CEN/TS 15531-5:2016 - Part 5: Functional service interfaces - Situation Exchange.

SIRI is maintained under a maintenance regime, with version control managed by a working group of the CEN TC/278 Working Group 3 . Later versions of the schema are available at the same site, together with change notes.

== History ==
The CEN SIRI standard was developed from European national standards for real-time data exchange, in particular the German VDV 453 standard, between 2000 and 2005, and included eight functional services. V1.0 became a CEN Technical Standard in 2006 and a full CEN standard in 2009.

Two additional functional services were added later Situation Exchange (SX) (Technical Standard 2009, Standard 2016) and Facility Monitoring (FM) (2011).

A number of small enhancements were subsequently added as informal changes creating interim releases v1.1, v1.2, etc.

Two other CEN standards were developed that made use of the 'SIRI Common Protocol Framework' to define their own functional services; NeTEx (v1.0 published in 2014) and Open API for distributed journey planning (v 1.0 published in 2017).

Version 2.0 of CEN-SIRI was developed between adopted in 2015. This is backwards compatible with V1.0 and both formalises the adoption of the interim enhancements and adds a number of additional features. An important new addition in SIRI v2.0 was the description of a uniform transform for rendering CEN-SIRI messages into a flat format that can be used in simple http requests without an XML rendering.

== Example of sites using SIRI ==
Different SIRI implementations are used in a number of sites globally

=== Europe ===
- Leicester Travel: Bus real-time from SIRI-SM
- bustimes.org (a large proportion of realtime data, including SPT delay information, comes from here)
- Terrassa Public Transport (Spain): Urban bus real-time and planned data.
- Transport for London Incidents from SIRI-GMS & Real-time data from LBS River http://www.tfl.gov.uk
- Entur, Norway: National hub for SIRI and NeTEx data https://developer.entur.org/pages-real-time-intro
- Västtrafik, PTA for western Sweden, uses SIRI ET and SX for real-time information in the travel planner: http://reseplanerare.vasttrafik.se/bin/query.exe/en
- Traveline Scotland: SIRI-SX for disruption information http://www.travelinescotland.com
- Helsingin Seudun Liikenne, Finland uses siri vm http://dev.hsl.fi/

=== North America ===
- New York City MTA BusTime - SIRI-SM and SIRI-VM - http://bustime.mta.info/wiki/Developers/Index
- Utah Transit Authority : http://developer.rideuta.com/StopMonitoringInstructions.aspx
- METRO (Houston, TX) : https://web.archive.org/web/20150111120549/http://developer.ridemetro.apiphany.com/products
- TransLink (MetroVancouver, Canada) : https://www.translink.ca/about-us/doing-business-with-translink/app-developer-resources

=== Asia ===
- Ningbo City - Buses, Real-time traffic control systems with SIRI, stations and vehicles electronic devices 2011-2012 http://www.novasolution.com.hk
- Israel - Real-time information on public buses and trains - https://www.gov.il/he/Departments/General/real_time_information_siri

=== Australia ===
- Transport for New South Wales - SIRI-SX for disruption information: https://transportnsw.info

== See also ==
- Identification of Fixed Objects In Public Transport (IFOPT)
- NeTEx
- Intermodal Journey Planner
- Transmodel
- TransXChange
- Transport standards organisations
- GTFS Realtime
