= Bus stop =

Place for passengers to board or disembark buses

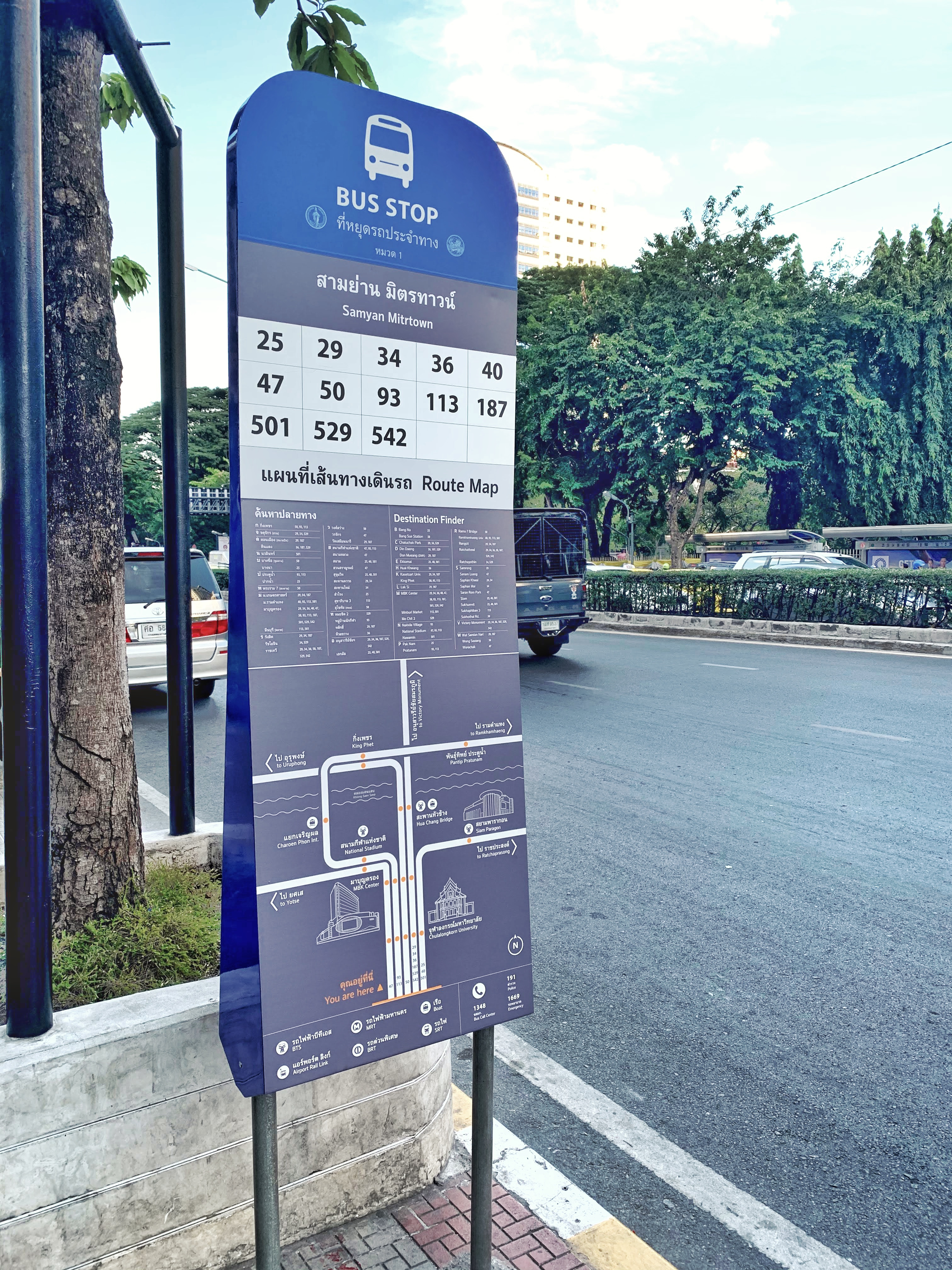
Bus stop signage in Bangkok, Thailand

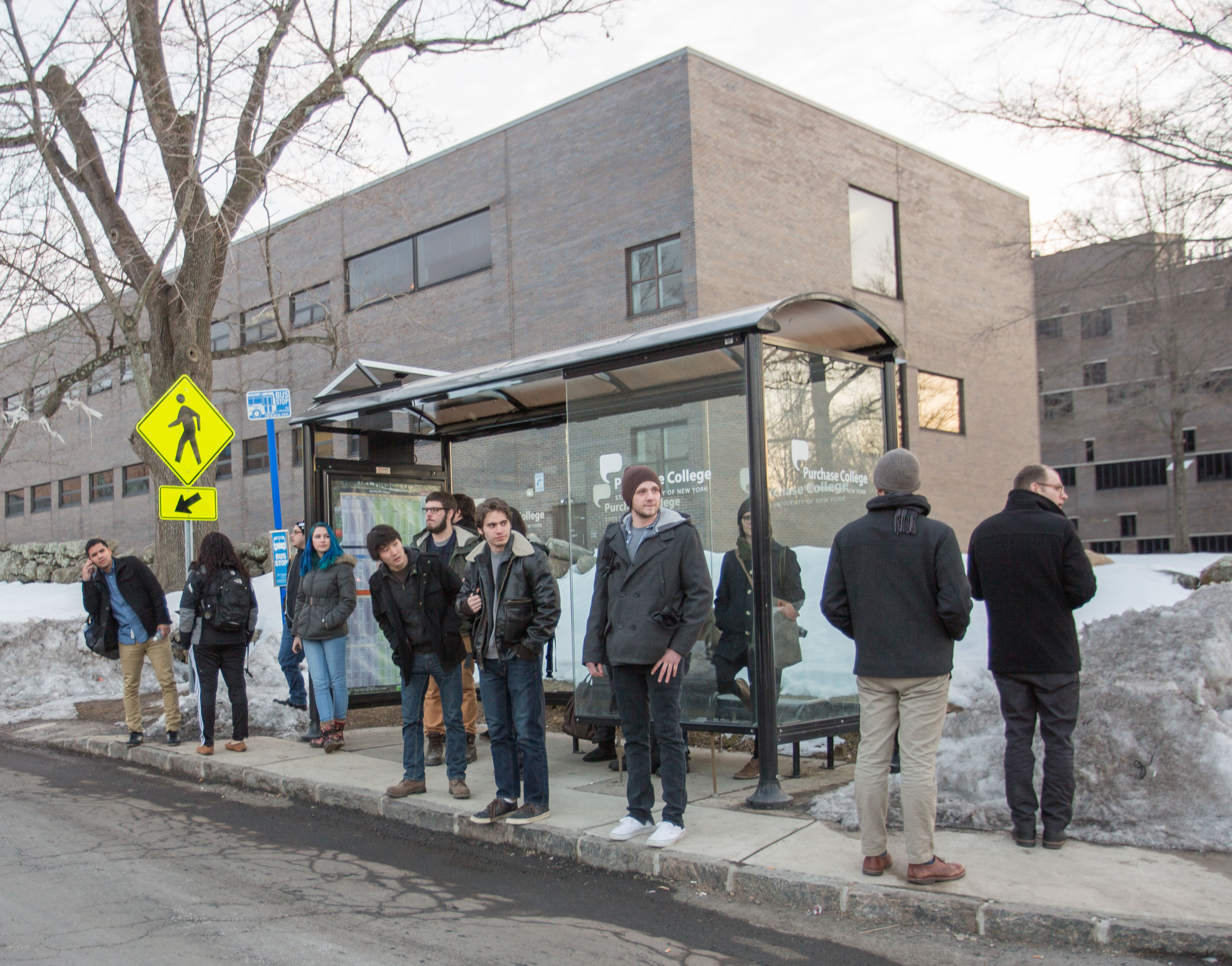
Riders waiting for a bus at a bus stop in SUNY Purchase College, Westchester County, New York, United States

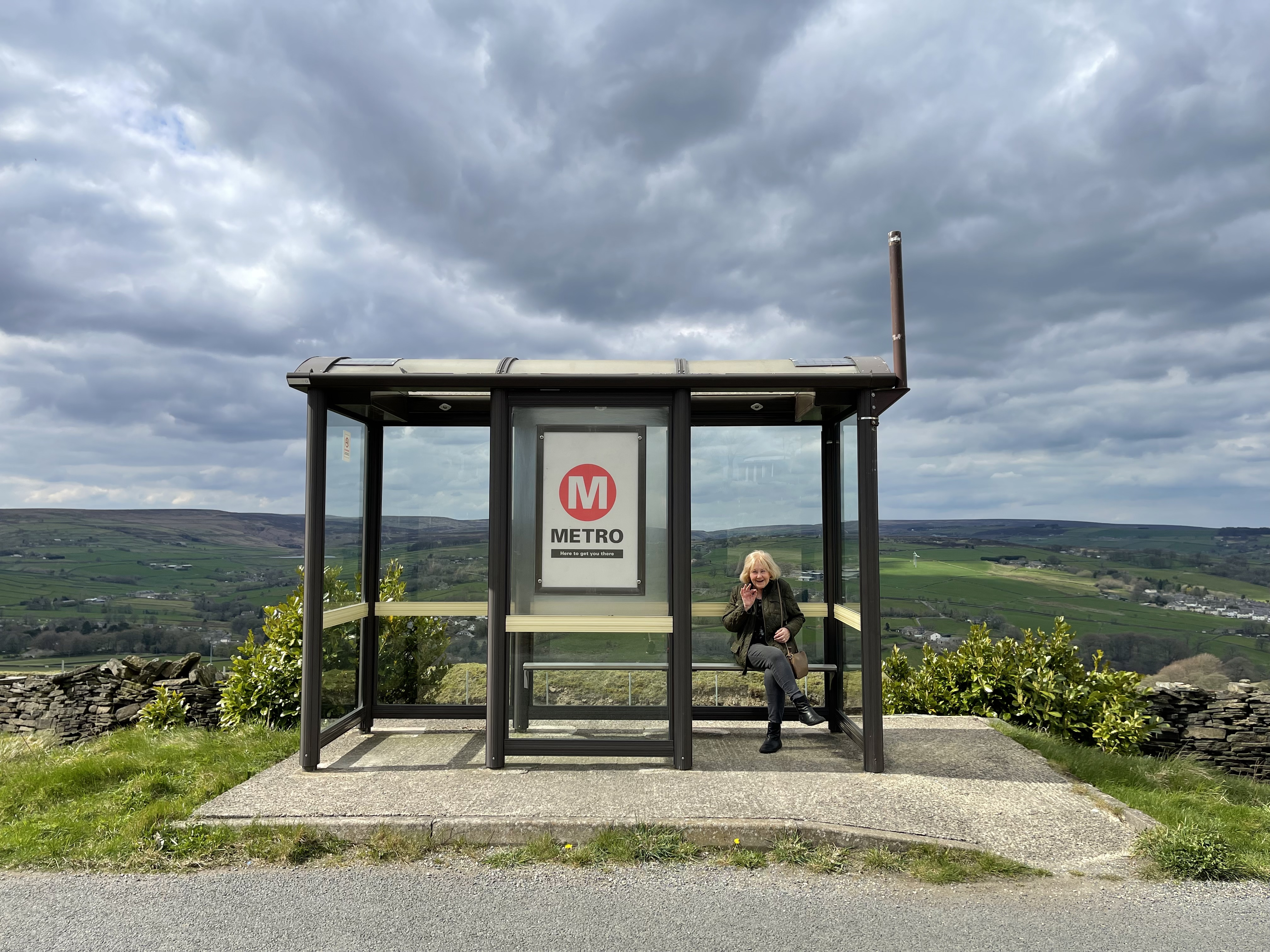
An elderly woman waiting at a bus stop in Yorkshire, England

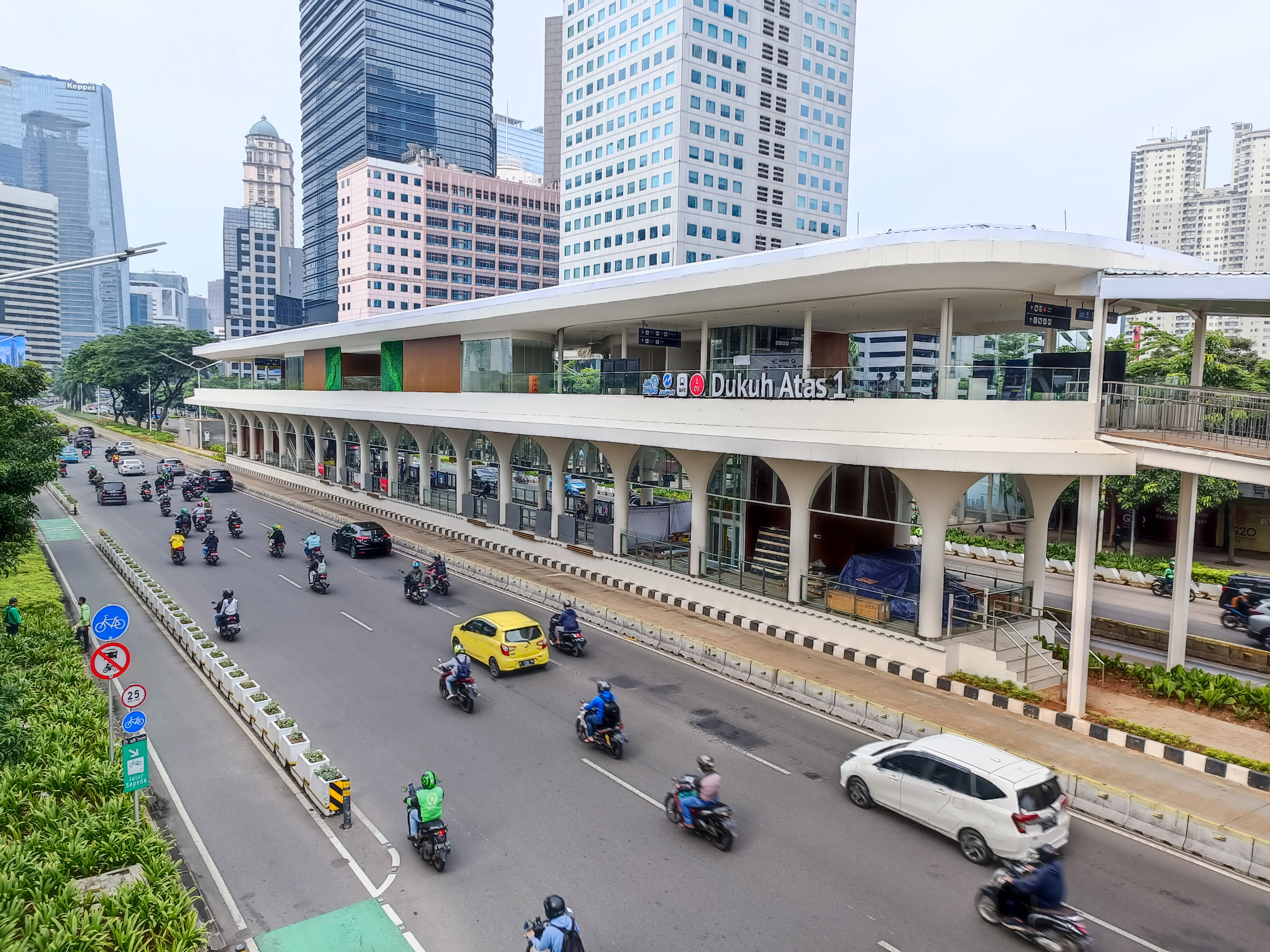
A rapid transit stop in Jakarta, Indonesia

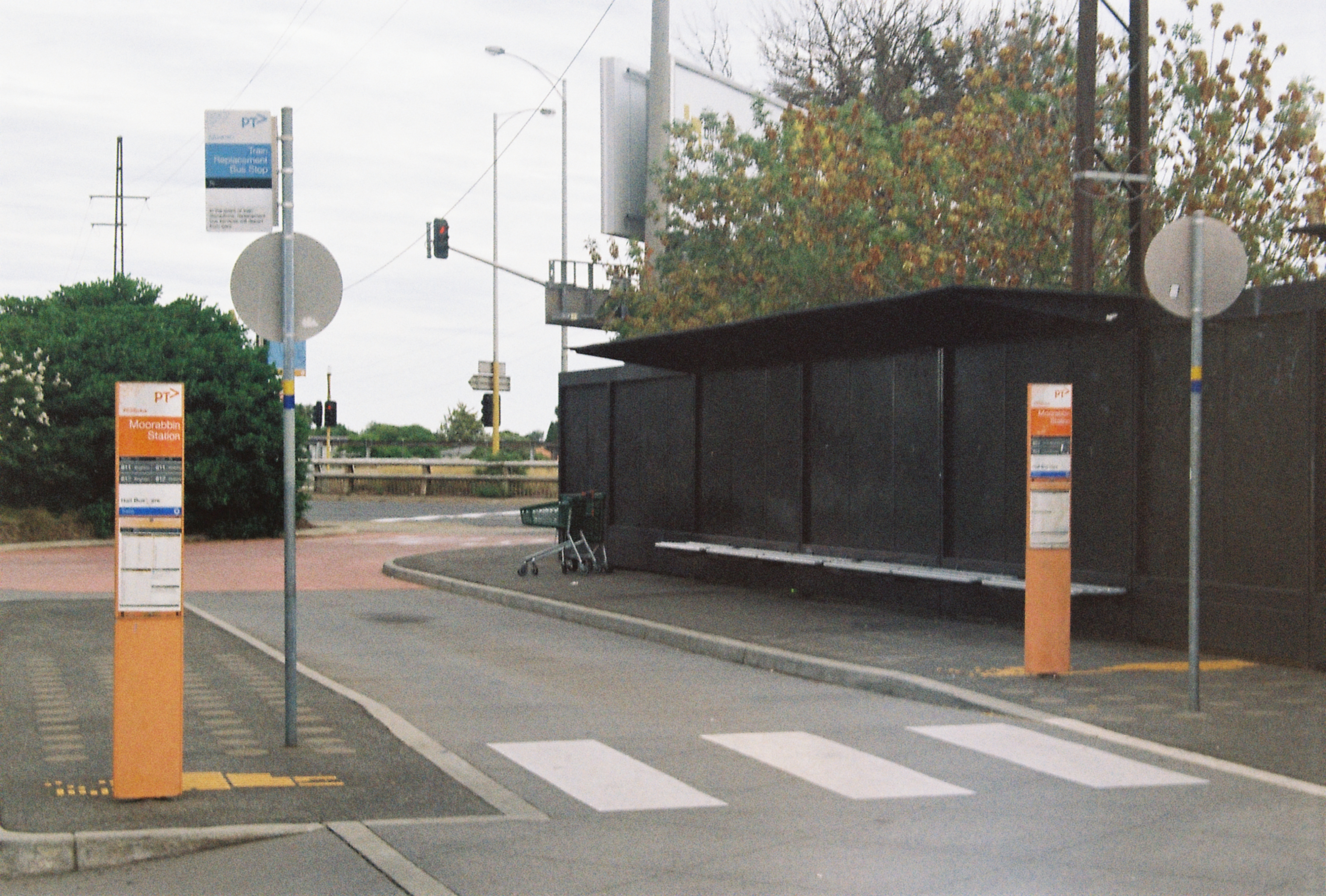
Bus stop next to Moorabbin train station in Victoria Australia

A bus stop is a place where buses stop for passengers to get on and off the bus. The construction of bus stops tends to reflect the level of usage, where stops at busy locations may have shelters, seating, and possibly electronic passenger information systems; less busy stops may use a simple pole and flag to mark the location. Bus stops are, in some locations, clustered together into transport hubs allowing interchange between routes from nearby stops and with other public transport modes to maximise convenience.

== Types of service ==
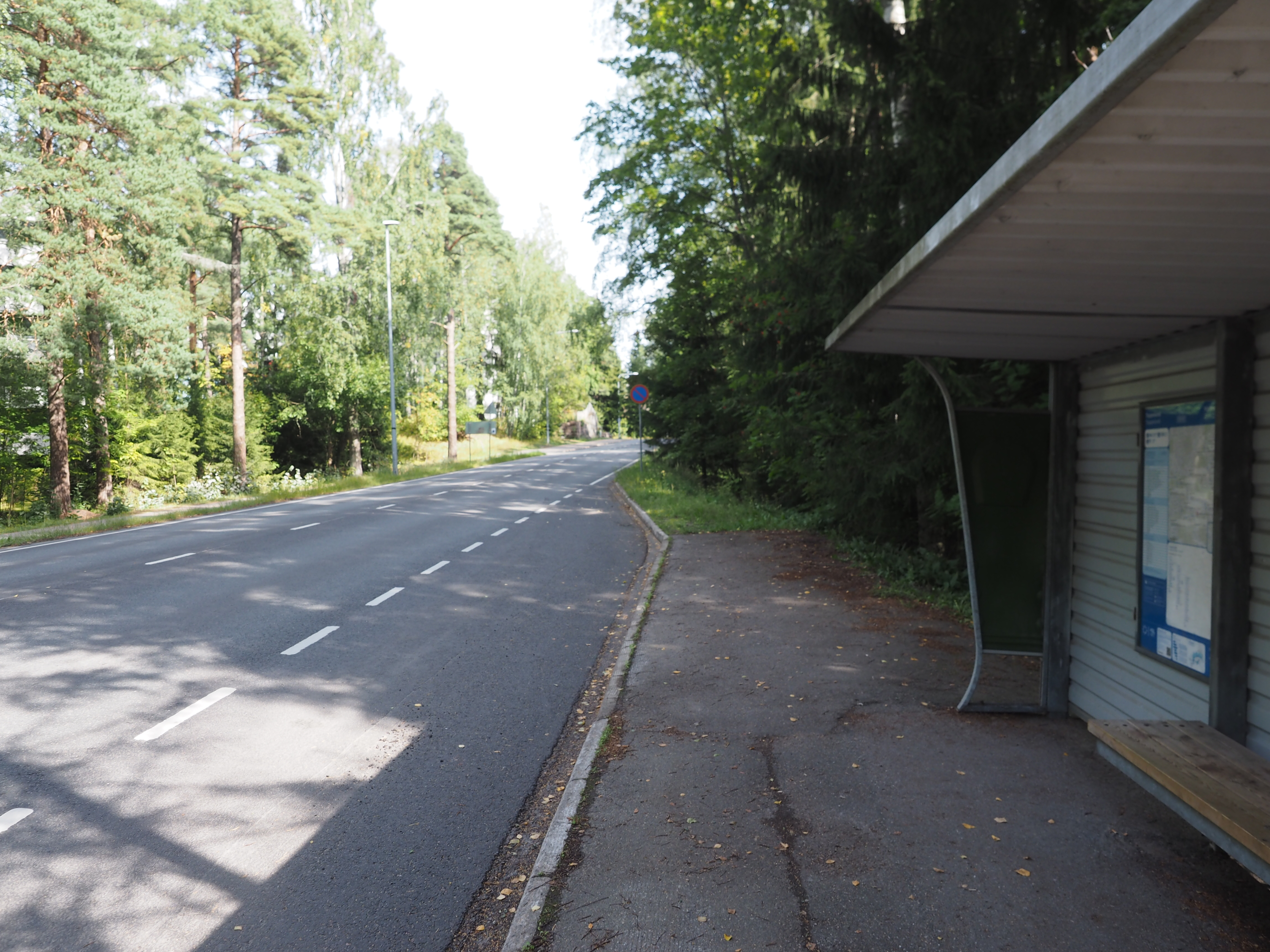
View from a bus stop in Haukilahti, Espoo, Finland

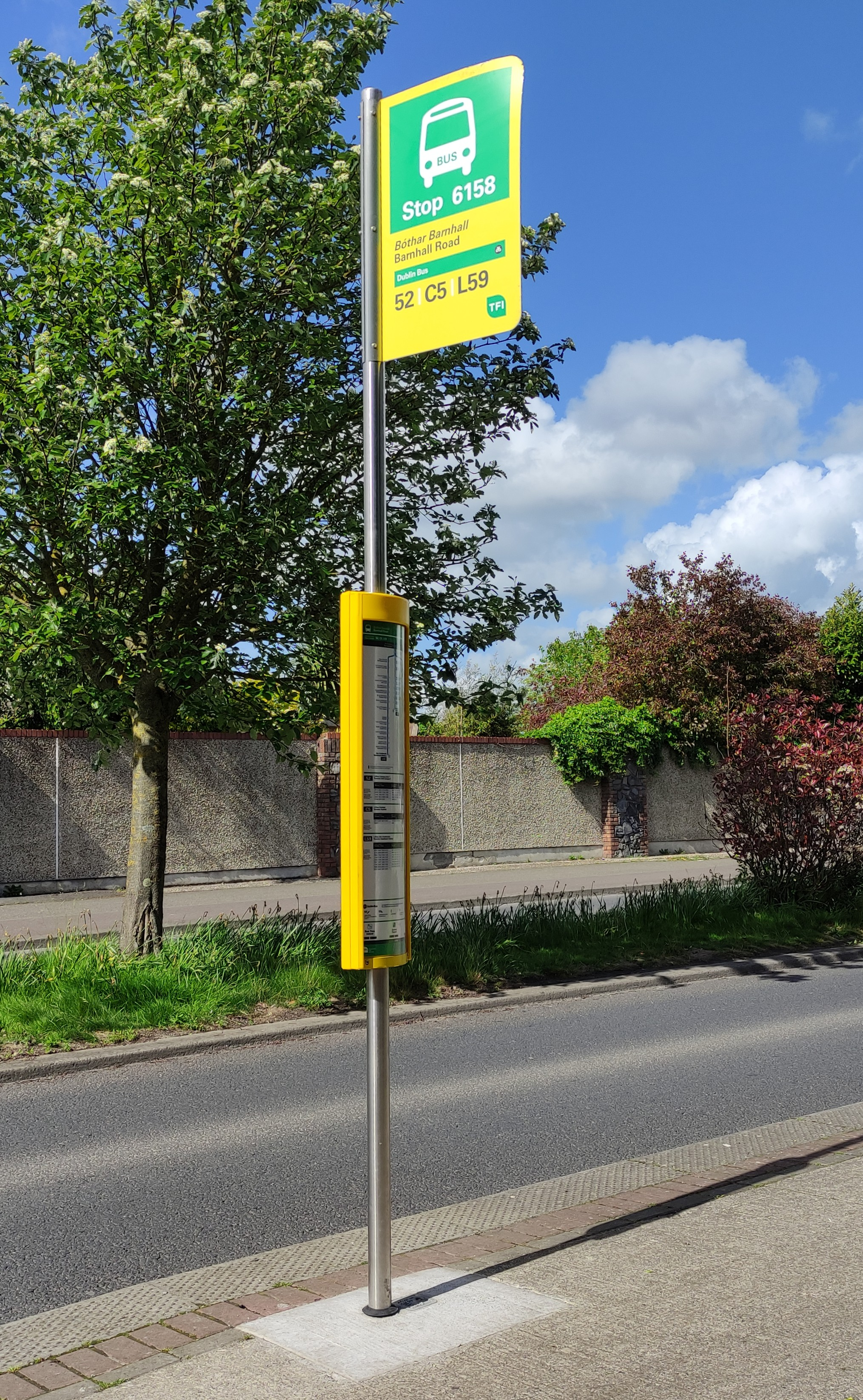
Bus stop pole in Dublin, Ireland, with various information

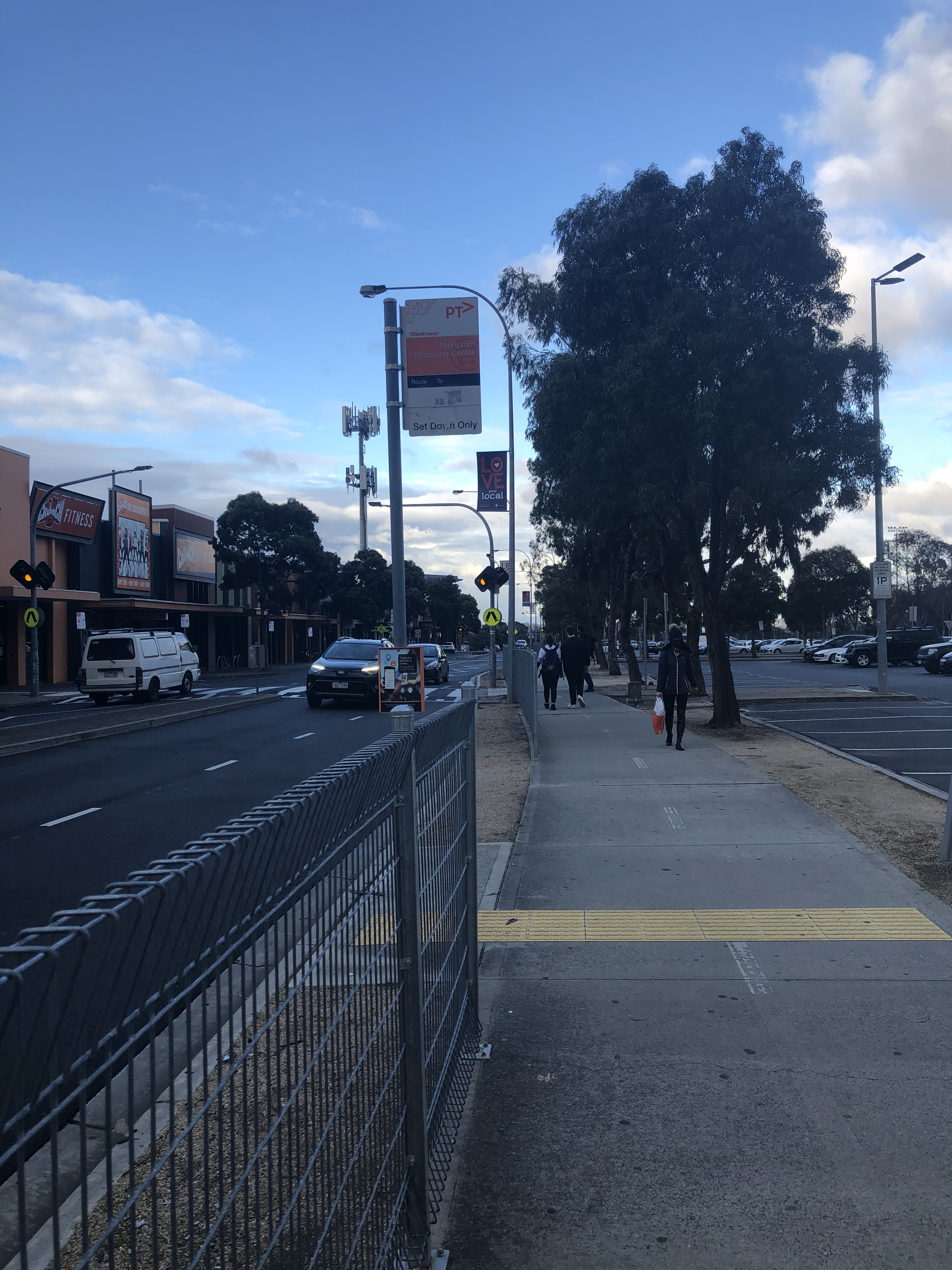
A set-down only bus stop near Highpoint Shopping Centre, Maribyrnong, Victoria

For operational purposes, there are three main kinds of stops: Scheduled stops, at which the bus should stop irrespective of demand; request stops (or flag stop), at which the vehicle will stop only on request; and hail and ride stops, at which a vehicle will stop anywhere along the designated section of road on request.

Certain stops may be restricted to "discharge/set-down only" or "pick-up only". Some stops may be designated as "timing points", and if the busis ahead of schedule it will wait there in order to adhere to the timetable. In urban areas where bus volumes are high, skip-stops are sometimes used to increase efficiency and reduce delays at bus stops. Fare stages may also be defined by the location of certain stops in distance or zone-based fare collection systems. Sunday stops are close to a church and used only on Sundays.

== History ==
From the 17th to the 19th century, horse-drawn stage coaches ran regular services between many European towns, starting and stopping at designated coaching inns where the horses could be changed and passengers board or alight, in effect constituting the earliest form of bus stop. The Angel Inn, Islington, the first stop on the route from London to York, was a noted example of such an inn. A seat in a stage coach usually had to be booked in advance.

John Greenwood opened the first bus line in Britain in Manchester in 1824, running a fixed route and allowing passengers to board on request along the way without a reservation. Landmarks such as public houses, rail stations and road junctions became customary stopping points.

Regular horse-drawn omnibuses started in Paris in 1828. George Shillibeer started his London horse Omnibus service in 1829, running between stops at Paddington (at the Yorkshire Stingo pub) and the Bank of England to a designated route and timetable. By the mid-19th century, guides were available to London bus routes, including maps with routes and the main stops.

== Design ==
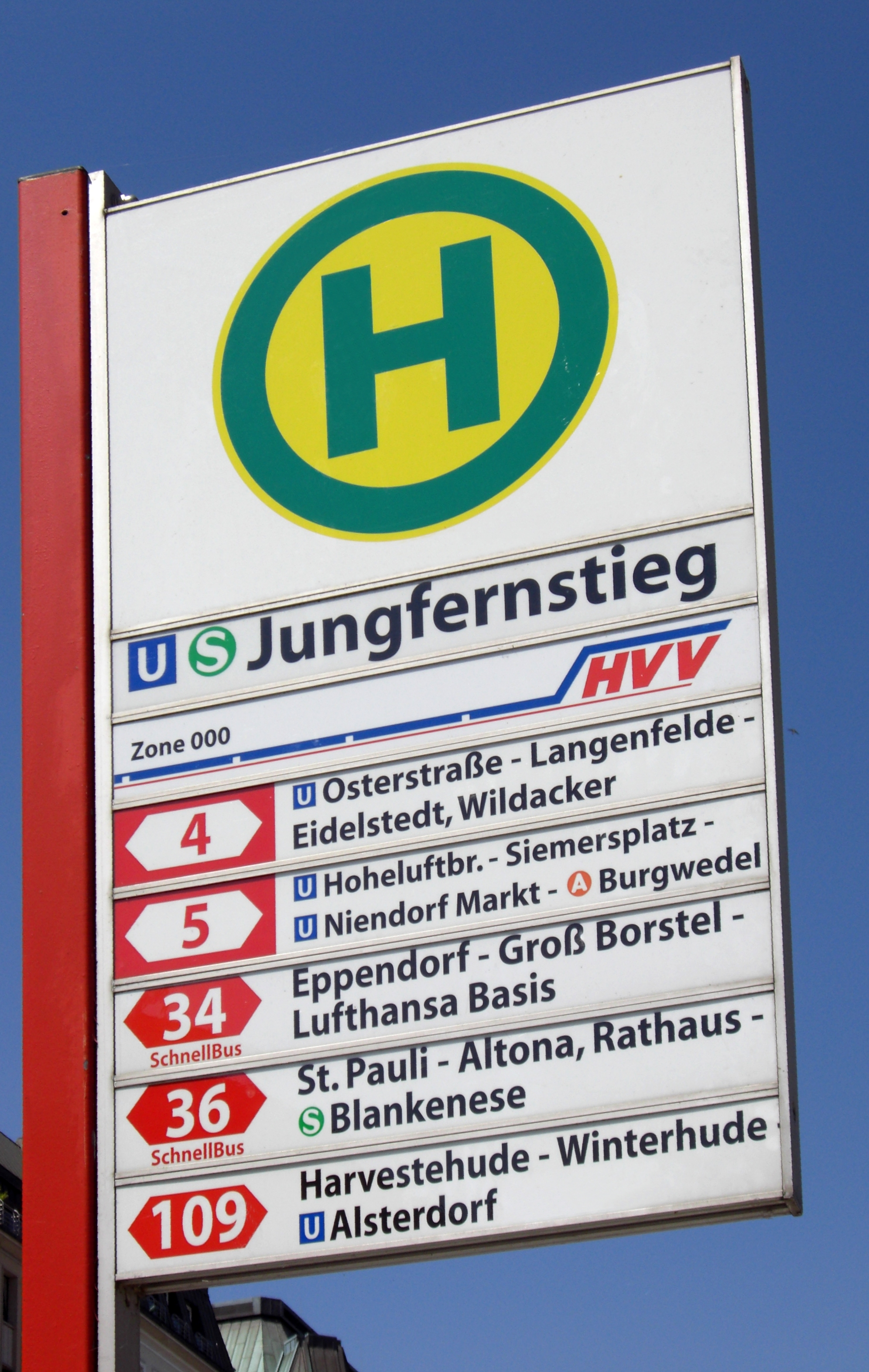
Bus stop sign in Hamburg with line numbers and major stops

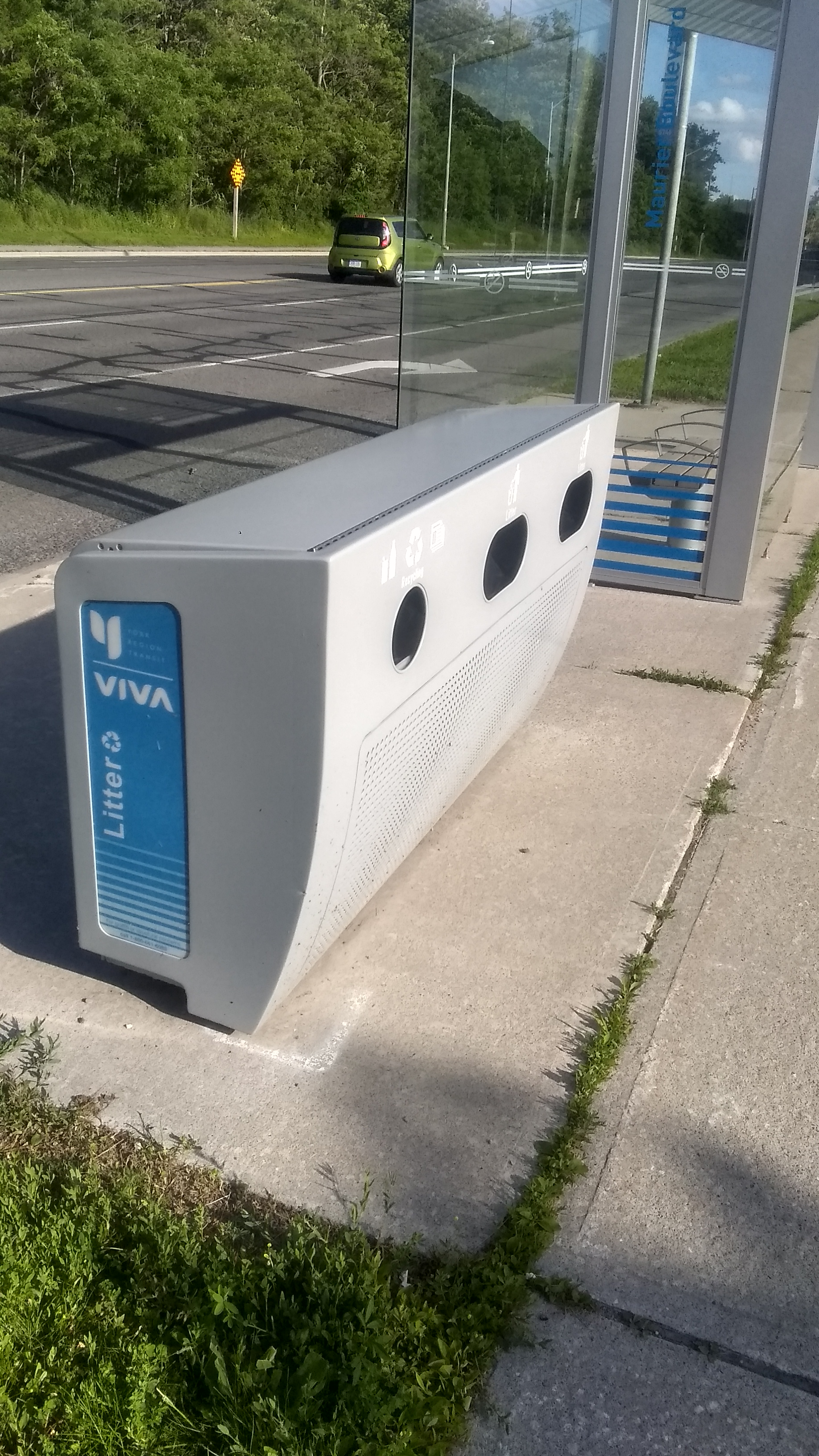
Bus stop infrastructure may include bins for litter. Pictured is a rural bus stop in York Region, north of Toronto.

Bus stop infrastructure ranges from a simple pole and sign, to a rudimentary shelter, to sophisticated structures. The usual minimum is a pole mounted flag with suitable name/symbol. Bus stop shelters may have a full or partial roof, supported by a two, three or four sided construction. Modern stops are usually steel and glass/perspex constructions, although in other places, such as rural Britain, stops may be wooden brick or concrete built.

The bus stop may include small inbuilt seats, and advertising, either posters, or illuminated, changeable or animated displays. Some bus stops haveinteractive advertising. Advertising may be the primary reason for the shelter, and the advertising pays for the bus shelter. Design and construction may be uniform to reflect a large corporate or local authority provider, or installations may be more variable where a small local authority such as a parish council is responsible for the stop. The stop may include separate street furniture such as a bench, lighting and a trash receptacle.

Individual bus stops may simply be placed on the sidewalk/pavement next to the roadway, although they can also be placed to facilitate use of a busway. More complex installations can include construction of a bus turnout or a bus bulb, for traffic management reasons, although use of a bus lane can make these unnecessary. A 'floating bus stop' or 'bus stop bypass' is located between a road and a cycle lane, so that passengers must cross the cycle lane in order to reach it. They are "ubiquitous in the Netherlands, and common across Europe".

Several bus stops may be grouped together to facilitate easy transfer between routes. These may be arranged in a simple row along the street, or in parallel or diagonal rows of multiple stops. Groups of bus stops may be integral to transportation hubs. With extra facilities such as a waiting room or ticket office, outside groupings of bus stops can be classed as a rudimentary bus station.

Convention is usually for the bus to draw level with the 'flag', although in areas of mixed front and rear entrance buses, such as London, a head stop, and more rarely a tail stop, indicates to the driver whether they should stop the bus with either the rear platform or the driver's cab level with the flag.

In certain areas, the area of road next the bus stop may be specially marked, and protected in law. Often, car drivers can be unaware of the legal implications of stopping or parking at a bus stop.

In bus rapid transit systems, bus stops may be more elaborate than street bus stops, and can be termed "stations" to reflect this difference. These may have enclosed areas to allow off-bus fare collection for rapid boarding, and be spaced further apart, like tram stops. Bus stops on a bus rapid transit line may also have a more complex construction allowing level boarding platforms, and doors separating the enclosure from the bus until ready to board.

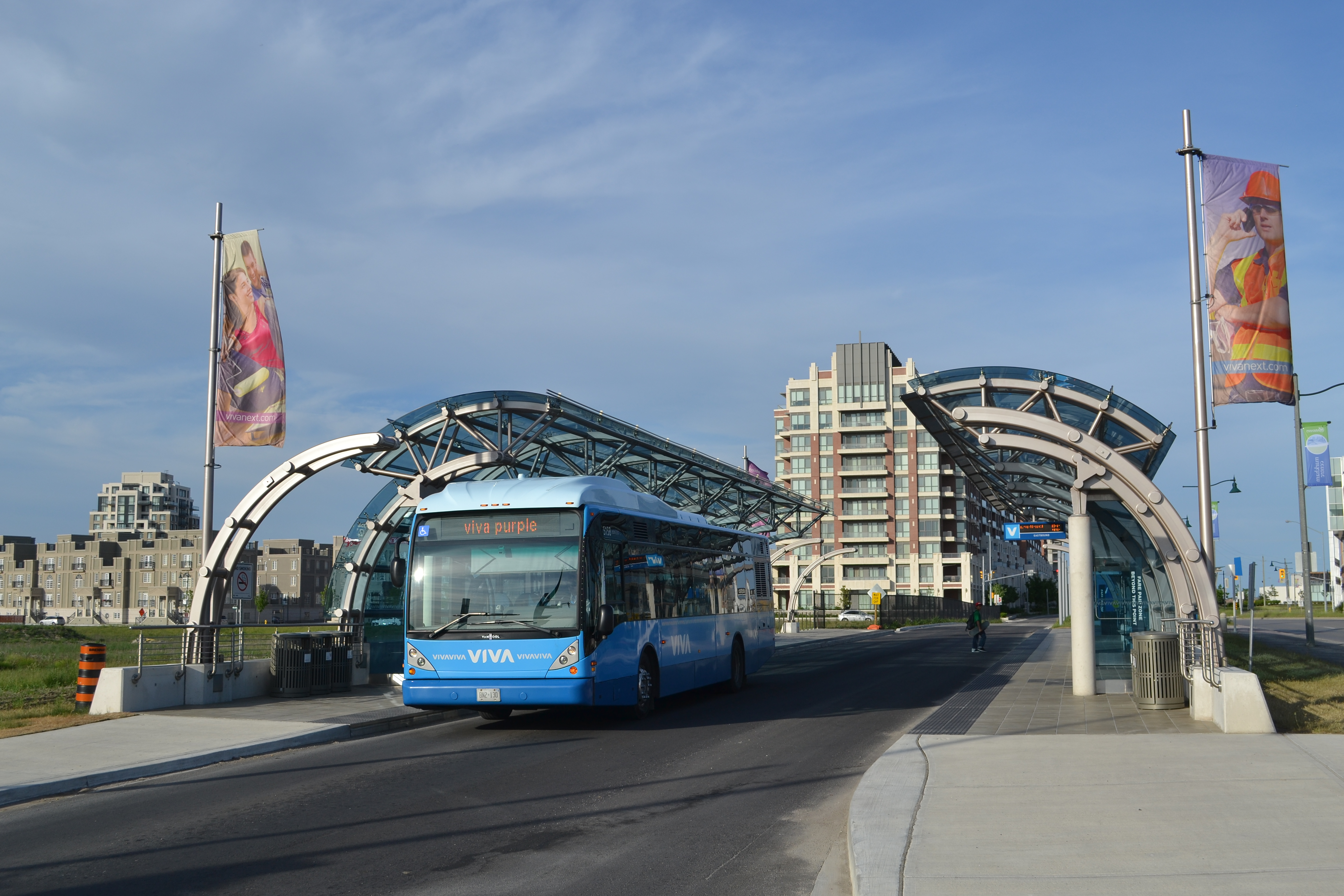
A large suburban bus stop in York Region, near Toronto

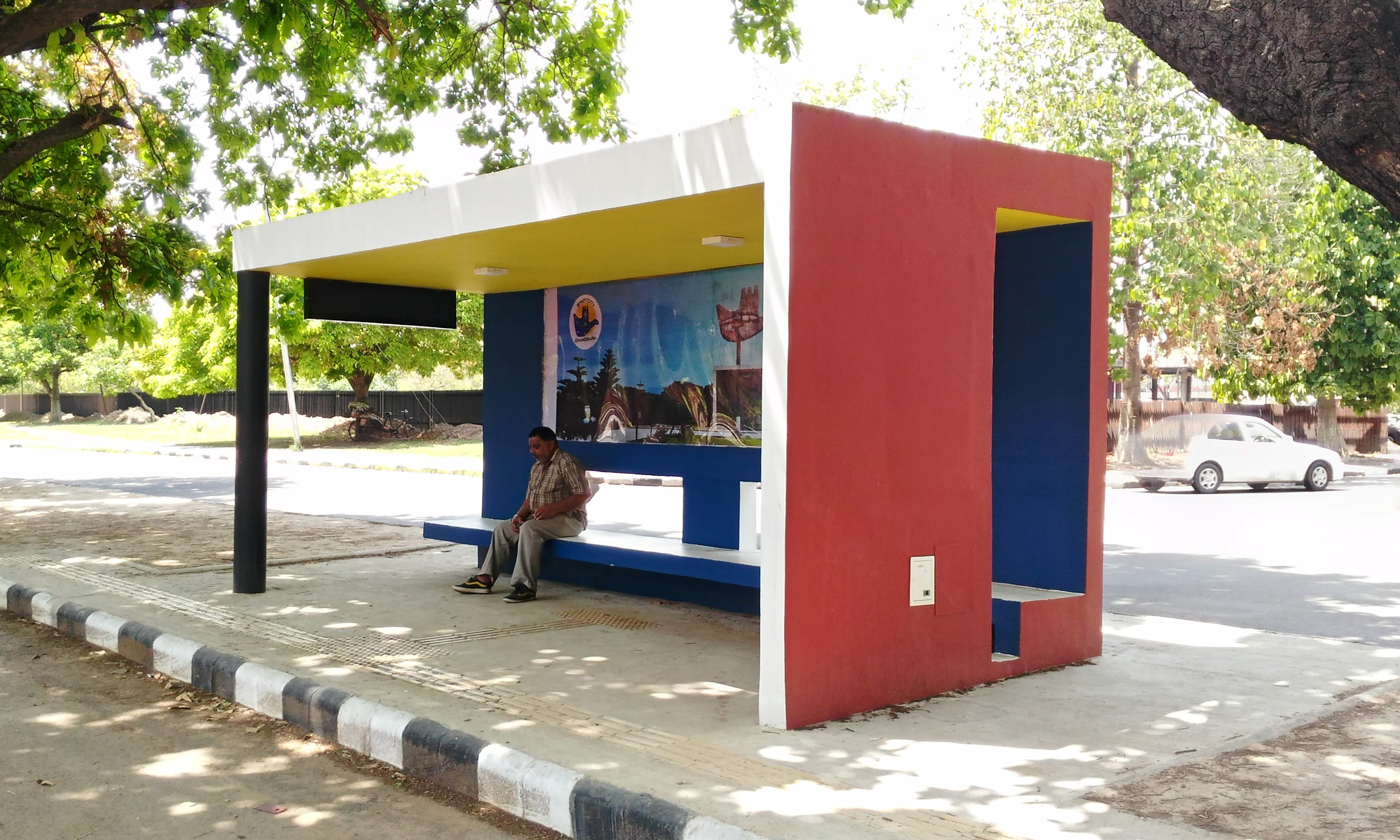
Bus stop shelter in Chandigarh, India

== Traffic signs ==
The bus stop flag (bus stop pole) is usually not only a carrier of information for passengers, but it also fulfills the role of a road sign that indicates the beginning (front) of the stop. In some places the flag may not indicate exactly the front of the stop, but is placed anywhere within the stop area.

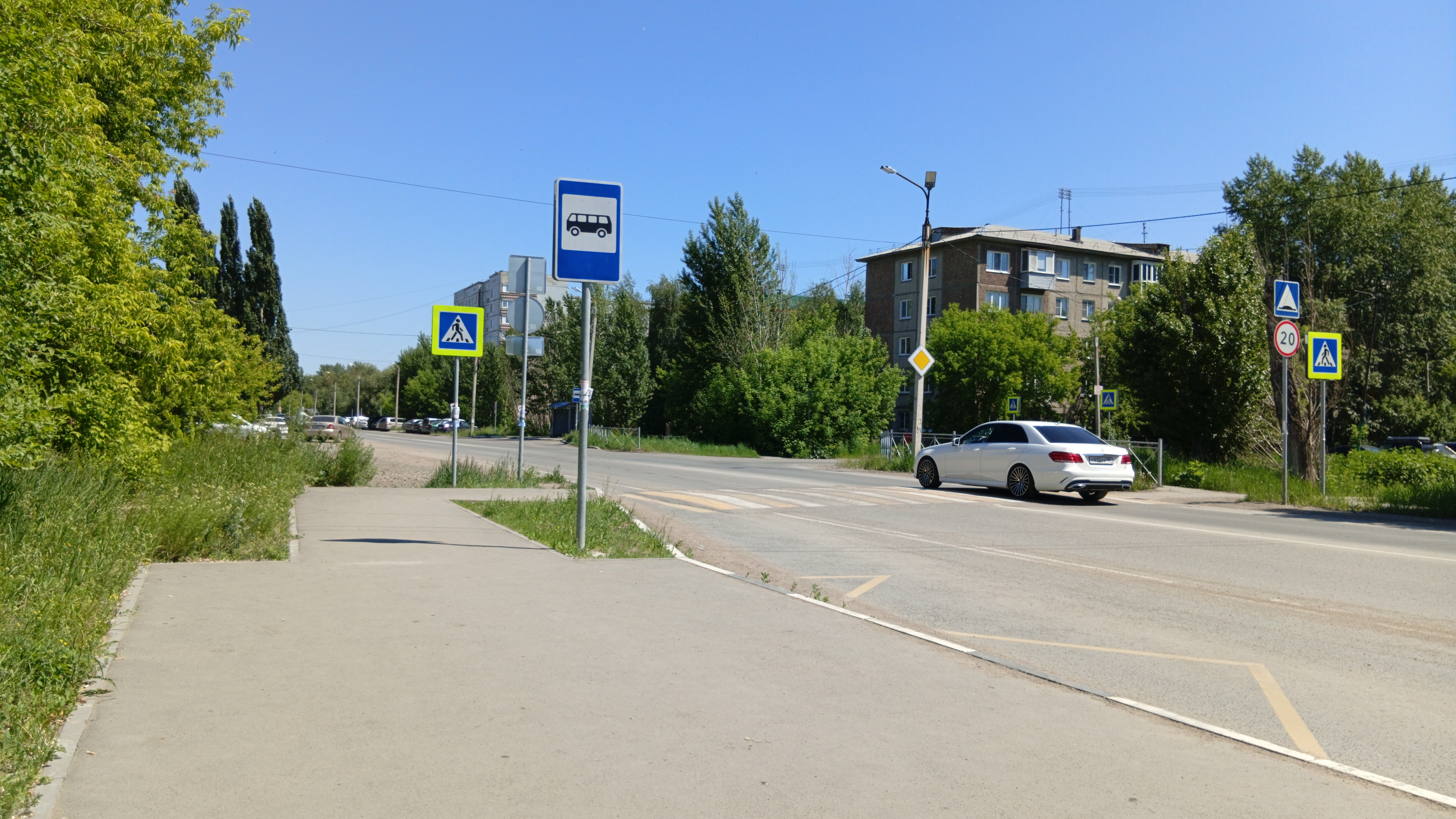
Bus stop sign in Omsk city, Russia

In some countries (e.g. Czech Republic and Slovakia), there is also a different road sign that is intended to mark the end of the stop and thus indicate its length. The use of such a sign may be limited to only certain types of stops, for example only to stops located in a continuous traffic lane, or only to stops that can be used by more than one vehicle at the same time, or if the stop is located in an interruption of the parking lane.

There are also various types of horizontal traffic markings of bus stops on the road. Some consist only of writings that draw attention to a stop or a dedicated stop lane; some can precisely define the space and length of the stop, including the space designated for entering and exiting the stop.

In dangerous places, another warning sign can be placed in front of the bus stop, or a sign prohibiting from going around the bus in the bus stop, etc.

In rare cases, traffic signals may also be placed to allow the bus to exit the stop lane or to stop traffic while the bus is at the stop. The mutual position of the opposite stops and their position in relation to the pedestrian crossing should be designed in such a way that the danger to pedestrians is minimized.

== Information ==
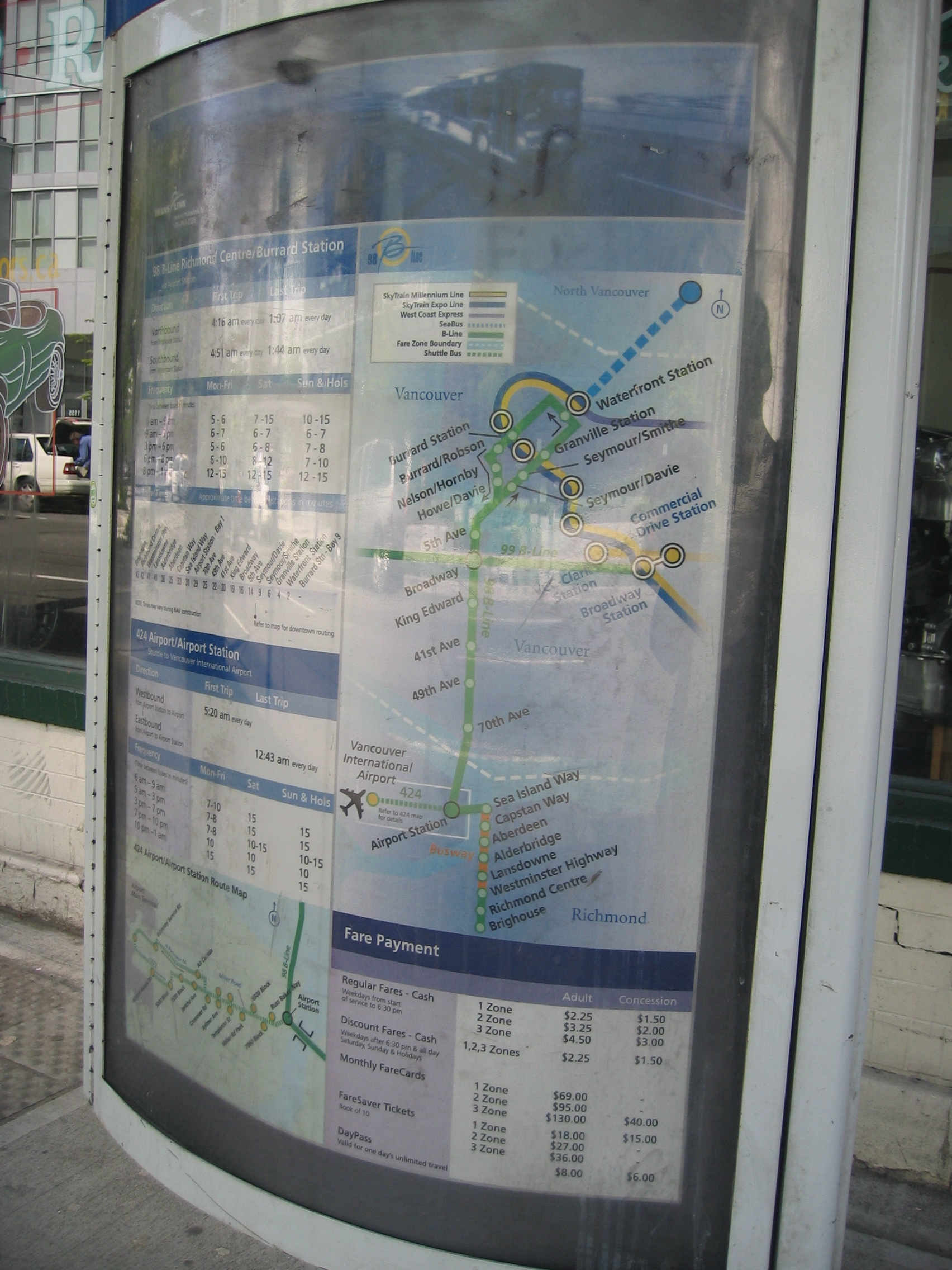
Bus stop info poster in Vancouver, Canada, also shows rapid transit routes

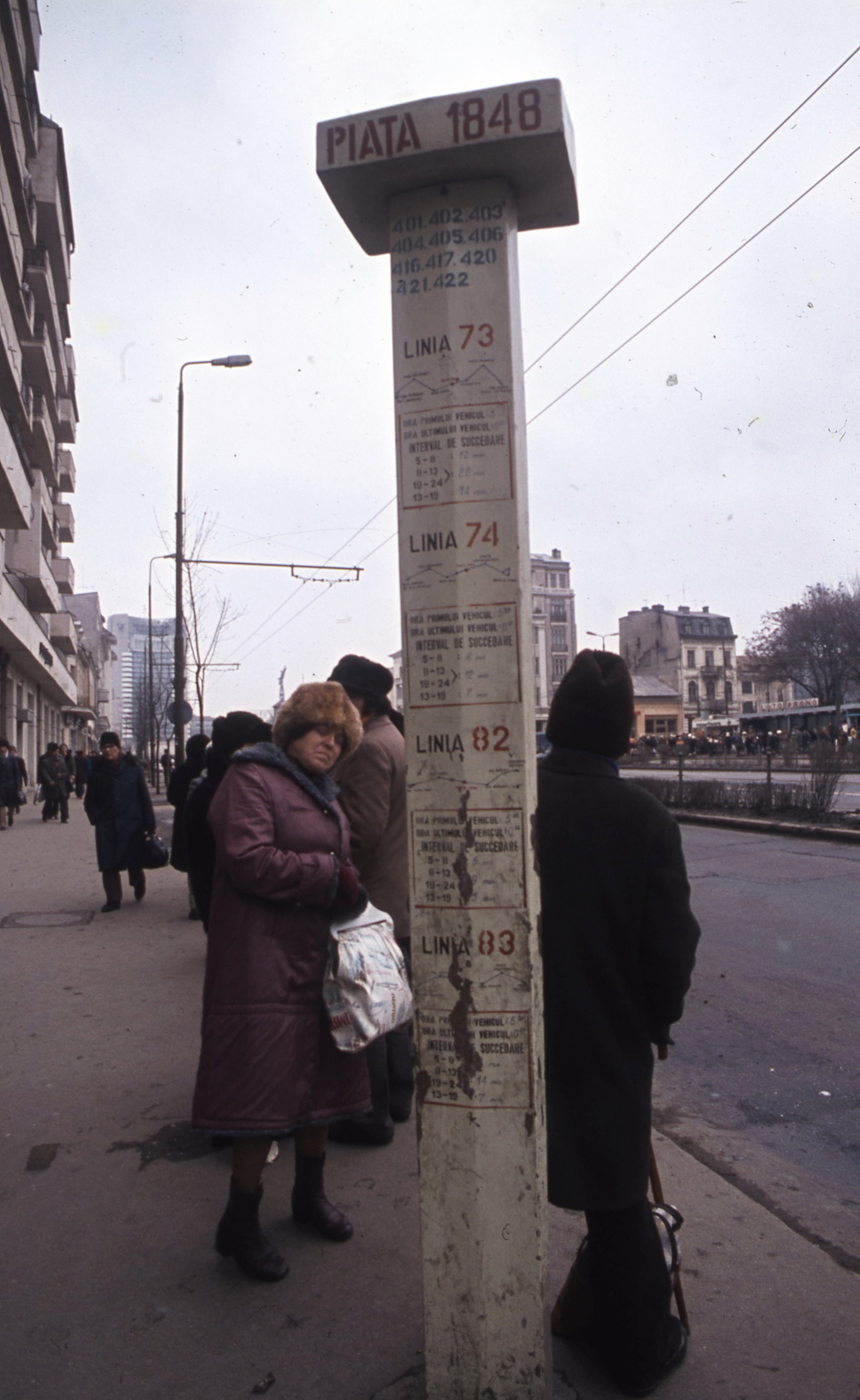
A worn-out "totem" of the ITB near the old town of Bucharest, 1986

=== Public-facing information ===
Most bus stops are identified with a metal sign attached to a pole or light standard. Some stops are plastic strips strapped on to poles and others involve a sign attached to a bus shelter. The signs are often identified with a picture of a bus and/or with the words "bus stop" in the local language.

The bus stop "flag" (a panel usually projecting from the top of a bus stop pole) will often show the route numbers of all the buses calling at the stop, perhaps distinguishing frequent, infrequent, 24-hour, and night services. The flag may also show the logo of the dominant bus operator, or the logo of a local transit authority with responsibility for bus services in the area. Additional information may include an unambiguous, unique name for the stop, and the direction/common destination(s) of most calling routes.

Bus stops will often show timetable information: either the full timetable, or for busier routes, the times or frequency that a bus will call at the specific stop. Route maps and tariff information may also be provided, and telephone numbers for relevant travel information services.

The stop may also incorporate, or have nearby, real time information displays with the arrival times of the next buses. Increasingly, mobile phone technology is being referenced on more remote stops, allowing the next bus times to be sent to a passenger's handset based on the stop location and the real time information. Automated ticket machines may be provided at busy stops.

=== Data model ===
Modern passenger information systems and journey planners require a detailed digital representation of stops and stations. The CEN Transmodel data model, and the related IFOPT data interchange standard, define how transport systems, including bus stops, should be described for use in computer models. In Transmodel, a single bus stop is modeled as a "Stop Point", and a grouping of nearby bus stops as a "Stop Area" or "Stop Place". The General Transit Feed Specification (GTFS) standard, originally developed by Google and TriMet, defines a simple and widely used data interchange standard for public transport schedules. GTFS also includes a table of stop locations which for each stop gives a name, identifier, location, and identification with any larger station that the stop may be a part of. OpenStreetMap also has a modelling standard for bus stops.

The United Kingdom has collected a complete database of its public transport access points, including bus stops, into the National Public Transport Access Nodes (NaPTAN) database with details of 350,000 nodes and which is available as open Data from data.gov.uk. In this database, developed by the Department of Transport in 2001, stops are classified as "marked" or "custom and usage" (i.e. unmarked stops where the driver will stop the vehicle on request). Use of marked stops varies: either the bus will always stop, or will stop by request only.

== Safety ==
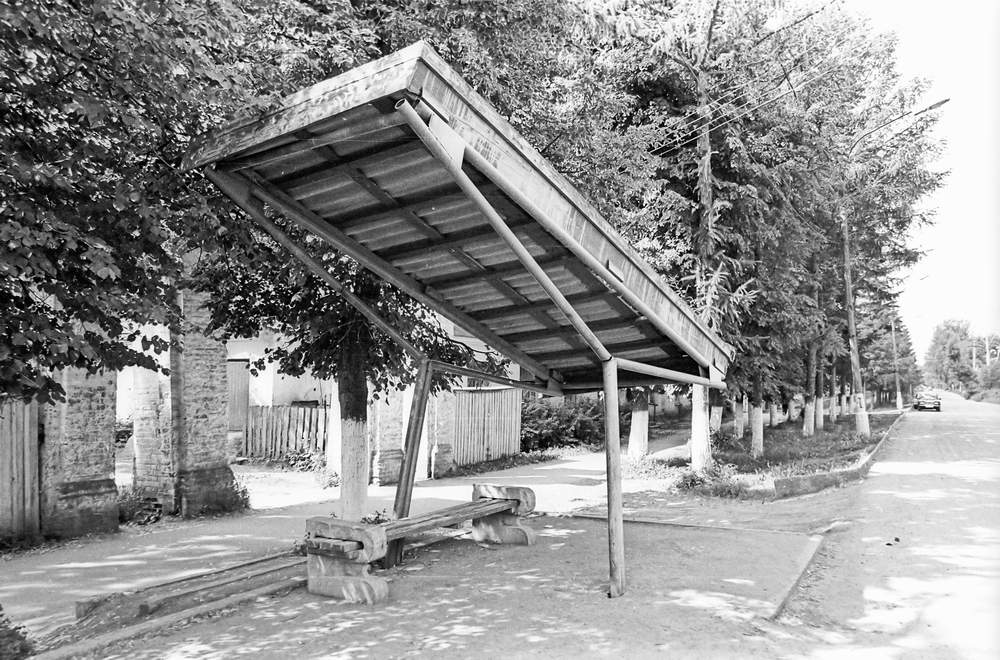
Neglected bus shelter needing repair in Pereslavl-Zalessky, Russia, 2000

Bus stops enhance passenger safety in a number of ways:

- Bus stops prevent passengers from trying to board or alight in hazardous situations such as at intersections or where a bus is turning and is not using the curb lane.
- A bus driver cannot be expected to continuously look for intending passengers. A bus stop means that the driver only needs to look for intending passengers at the approach to each bus stop.
- Having bus stops requires passengers to group themselves prior to boarding, which reduces time spent at boarding.
- At night, when passenger numbers are lower, restrictions are sometimes relaxed and passengers may be allowed to exit the bus anywhere within reason.
- Bus turnouts, or lay-bys, allow buses to stop without impeding the flow of traffic on the main roadway.

== Bus stop shelters ==
=== Cooling ===
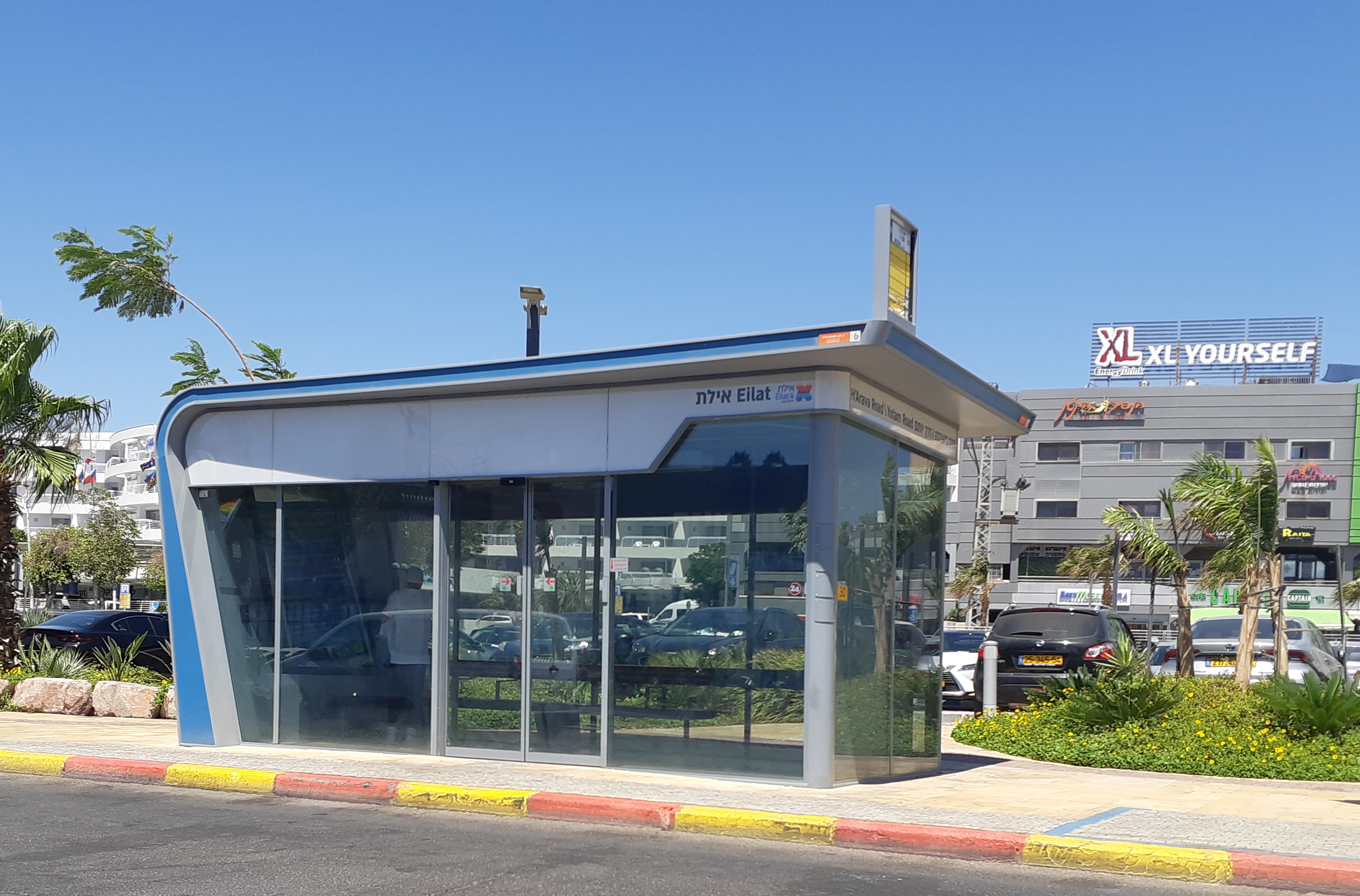
Bus stop in Eilat, Israel with air conditioning, 2021

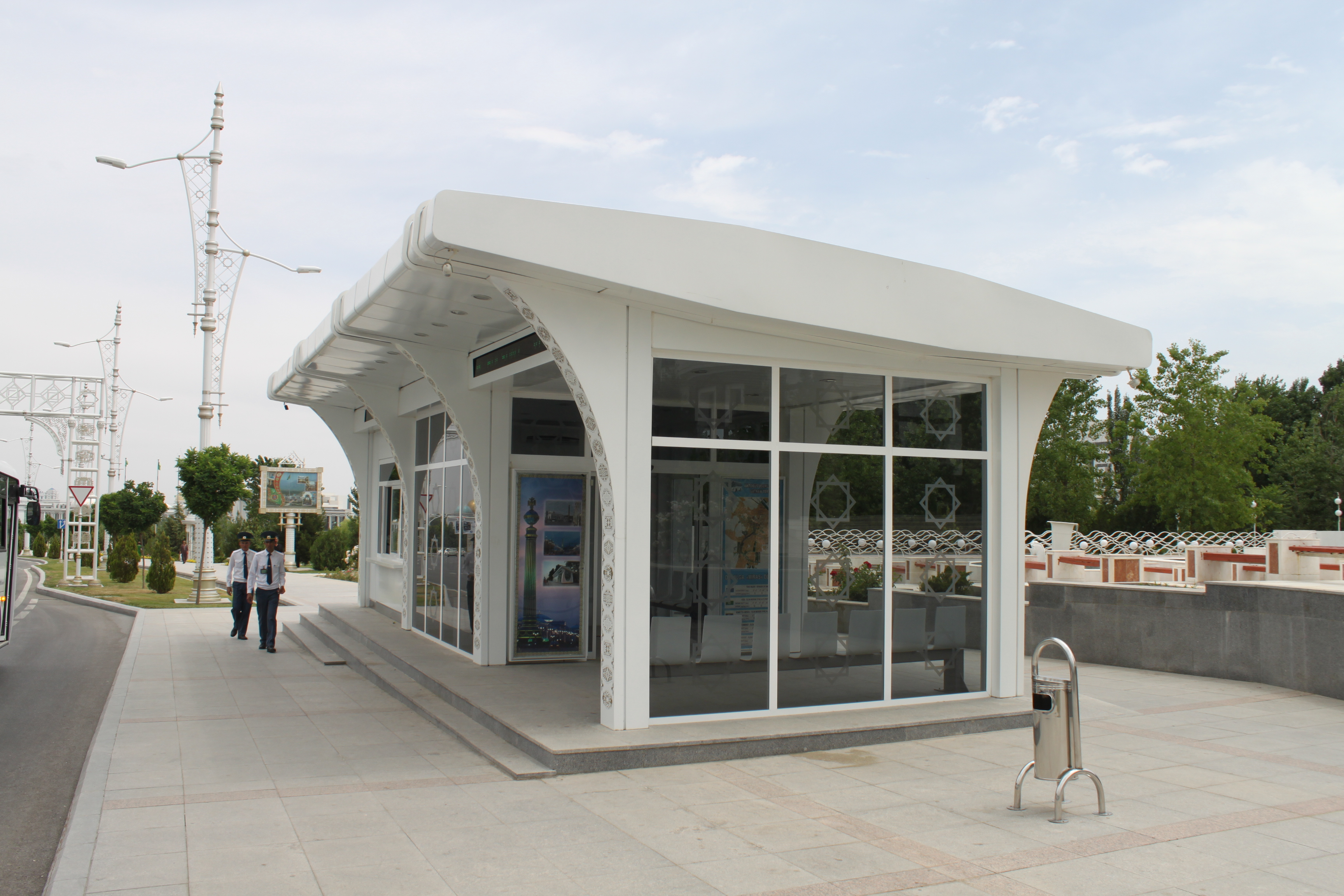
Bus stop in Ashgabat, Turkmenistan with TV and air conditioning

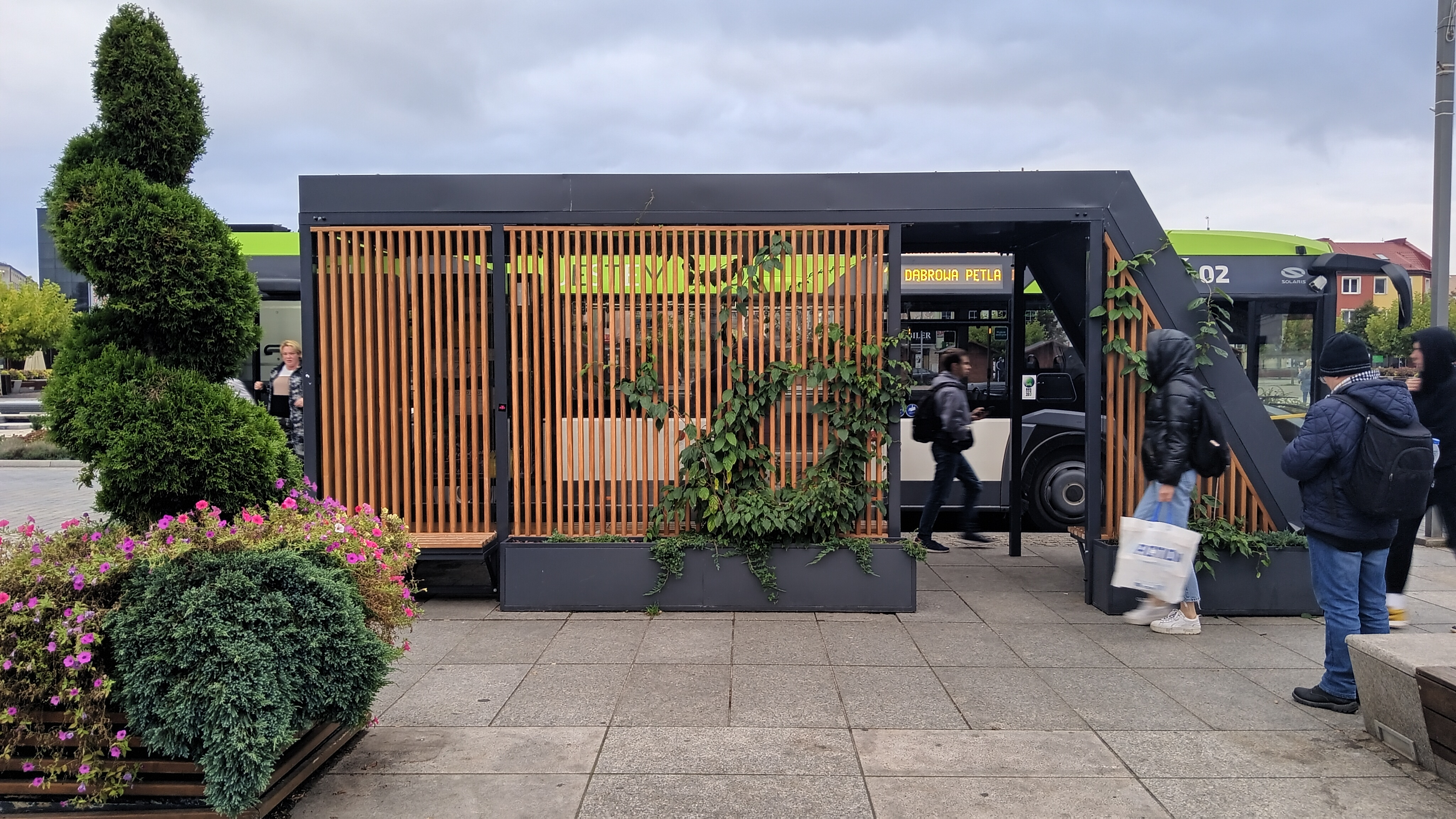
Bus stop in Tomaszów Mazowiecki, Poland

In countries with hot climates, air-conditioned bus stop shelters are sometimes used, for example in Dubai in the United Arab Emirates, Hyderabad in India, Eilat in Israel, Ashgabat in Turkmenistan.

As an alternative to air conditioning, passive daytime radiative cooling has been used to cool bus stop shelters. Bus stops at Arizona State University and the surrounding areas of Tempe, Arizona used a 3M film to lower shelter temperatures by 4 °C. A bus shelter in a mid-rise area of Tehran used passive cooling to cool a bus shelter by up to 10 °C.

== Regulation ==
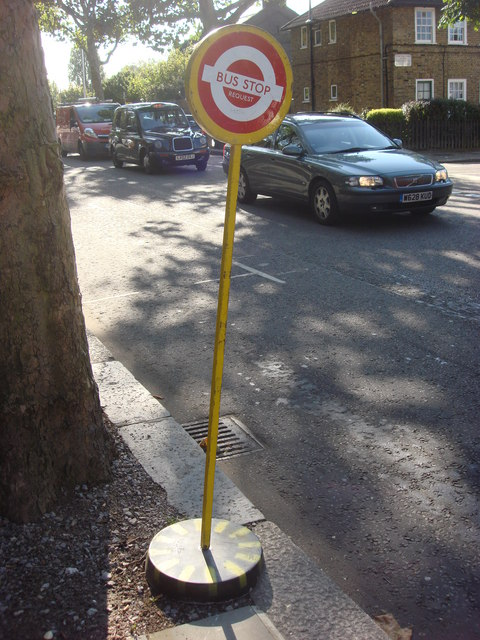
Sign marking a temporary bus stop in London

Some jurisdictions have introduced particularised legislative controls to foster safer bus stop design and management. The State of Victoria, Australia, for example, has enacted a Bus Safety Act which contains performance-based duties of care which apply to all industry participants who are in a position to influence the safety of bus operations - what is called the "chain of responsibility". The safety duties apply to all bus services, both commercial and non-commercial, and to all buses regardless of seating capacity. Breach of the duty is a serious criminal offence which carries a heavy penalty.

The primary duty holder under the Bus Safety Act is the operator of the bus service, as the person who has effective responsibility and control over the whole operation. However, the Act also contains a safety duty covering "people with responsibility for bus stops", including people who design, build, or maintain the stop, plus those who decide on its location.

This duty was introduced in response to research showing that the most serious hazard associated with bus travel occurs when passengers, especially children, are crossing the road after alighting from the bus. The location and layout of a bus stop is therefore a factor in the level of risk.

Safety duties are also imposed by the Bus Safety Act on a range of other people including -

- "bus safety workers" including drivers, schedulers who set bus timetables, and mechanics and testers who repair or assess vehicle safety
- "procurers" - people who procure the bus service, known as the "customer" in the commercial charter sector.

All of these persons can clearly affect bus safety. They are required by the Bus Safety Act to ensure that, in carrying out their activities, they eliminate risks to health and safety if 'practicable' - or work to reduce those risks 'so far as is reasonably practicable'. This familiar practicability formula is borrowed from Victoria's Rail Safety Act (and a subsequent national model Rail Safety Bill) and the Occupational Health and Safety Act 2004.

In Europe, as a rule, the design of roads and the placement of road signs are subject to detailed technical standards, the requirements of which should ensure the safety of local traffic regulation, and is subject to official approval. As a rule, it is permissible to place a stop of a bus line only in a place that is approved and marked as a bus stop.

== Research ==
Bus stop capacity is often an important consideration in the planning of bus stops serving multiple routes within urban centers. Limited capacity may mean buses queue up behind each other at the bus stop, which can cause traffic blockages or delays. Bus stop capacity is typically measured in terms of buses/hour that can reliably use the bus stop. The main factors that affect bus stop capacity are:

- Number of loading areas (or number of buses that can stop at one time)
- Average dwell time (How much time it takes a bus to load/unload passengers)
- G/C ratio of nearby traffic signal (green time / cycle length)
- Clearance time (time it takes bus to re-enter the traffic stream)

Detailed procedures for calculating bus stop capacity and bus lane capacity using skip stops are outlined in Part 4 of the Transit Capacity and Quality of Service Manual, published by the US Transportation Research Board.

Transit agencies are increasingly looking at consolidation of possibly previously haphazardly placed bus stops as a way to improve service cheaply and easily. Bus stop consolidation evaluates the bus stops along an established bus route and develops a new pattern for optimal bus stop placement. Bus stop consolidation has been proven to improve operating efficiency and ridership on bus routes.

== Fakes ==
A fake bus stop at Southend Hospital, United Kingdom

Some nursing homes and hospitals have built fake, imitation bus stops for their residents who have dementia. Some of these bus stops are even fitted with old advertisements and timetables to give a sense of familiarity. The residents will sit at the bus stop waiting for a bus to take them to their imagined destination. After some time, a staff member comes to escort the clients back to the home.

== In popular culture ==
Bus stops are common tropes in popular culture. In 1956, there was a Marilyn Monroe film called Bus Stop. A scene in the movie Forrest Gump takes place at a bus stop and almost all episodes of South Park series start by presenting the main characters in a bus stop.

In Japanese culture, the movie My Neighbor Totoro featured a bus stop, both for ordinary buses and a cat bus. The opening scene of the anime Air shows the main character getting off at a bus stop. The Japanese movie Summer Wars features a rural bus stop.

Renowned rabbis have taught lessons in Judaism from their interaction and experience with bus stops.

== See also ==
- Automatic vehicle location
- Bus bulb
- Bus terminus
- Intermodal passenger transport
- Metro station
- Train station
- Ticket (admission)
- Wait/walk dilemma
