= NeTEx =

XML file format for public transport

NeTEx (formally Network Timetable Exchange PD CEN/TS 16614-1:2014, PD CEN/TS 16614-2:2014 and PD CEN/TS 16614-3:2014) is the CEN Technical standard for exchanging Public Transport Information as XML documents. It provides a W3C XML schema based on the Transmodel abstract model of common public transport concepts and data structures and can be used to exchange many different kinds of data between passenger information systems, including data describing for stops, facilities, timetabling and fares. Such data can be used by both operational management systems and customer facing systems for journey planning etc.

== Scope ==
NeTEx provides a modular XML schema for public transport information data including passenger information systems, with coverage of a number of different subdomains of public transport information, including transport network infrastructure and topology, public transport schedules, journey planning, fares, fare validation. It includes uniform mechanisms for versioning and identifying entity instances within a global context. It provides protocols for exchanging NeTEx XML documents using either asynchronous bulk exchange and any file transfer protocol, or dynamic messaging using http and a set of protocols that make use of the common framework of the Service Interface for Real Time Information. Like Transmodel, on which it is closely based (using model driven design concepts), NeTEx provides reusable abstractions to represent data elements of public transport.

- Part 1 - Network Topology (CEN/TS 16614-1:2014) describes the Public Transport Network topology and timing concepts; and includes common framework concepts used by all parts.
- Part 2 - Timing Information (CEN/TS 16614-2:2014) describes Scheduled Timetables, including complex rail and non-rail modes;
- Part 3 - Public Transport Fares (CEN/TS 16614-3:2015) covers Fare information, including complex fare models

== History ==
NeTEx is an evolution and offspring of the Transmodel project, which developed a conceptual model to harmonise and systemise the data formats of a number of European countries. It represents a harmonisation of a number of different European standards such as Bison (Netherlands), Trident (France), TransXChange (UK), VDV 452 (Germany), TAP TSI, for all of which a mapping to NeTEx exists. There are also mappings to GTFS and railML. Other legacy standards it is designed to replace includes Neptune, IFOPT, NOPTIS and IFM.

V1.0 of NeTEx was published by CEN in 2014. V1.1 is under development for completion in 2018/2019.

In 2017, under the Intelligent Transport Systems Priority Action A Directive (2010/40/E), the European Commission recognized NeTEx as a strategic standard for the cross-border exchange of data to enable the provision of EU-wide multi-modal travel information services, with the aim of making public transport data available in NeTEx format at National Access Points in all European countries by 2019.

== See also ==
- TransXChange
- Transmodel
- Transport standards organisations
- Identification of Fixed Objects In Public Transport (IFOPT)
- Service Interface for Real Time Information (SIRI)
- GTFS
- GTFS Realtime
