= Travel itinerary =

Schedule of events related to planned travel

A travel itinerary is a schedule of events relating to planned travel, generally including destinations to be visited at specified times and means of transportation to move between those destinations. For example, both the plan of a business trip and the route of a road trip, or the proposed outline of one, are travel itineraries.

The construction of a travel itinerary may be assisted by the use of travel literature, including travel journals and diaries, a guide book containing information for visitors or tourists about the destination, a trip planner website dedicated to helping the users plan their trips, or a trip planner app that allows users to store travel itineraries on their smart phone. Typically a travel itinerary is prepared by a travel agent who assists one in conducting their travel for business or leisure. Most commonly a travel agent provides a list of pre-planned travel itineraries to a traveller, who can then pick one that they're most satisfied with. However, with the advent of the internet, online maps, navigation, online trip planners and easier access to travel information in general, travellers, especially the younger ones prefer a more do-it-yourself approach to travel planning. There has been a rise in the use of travel apps in the last few years. The Travel App Usage and Revenue Statistics (2025) showcased the travel app market gaining a 13% increase in revenue from 2023 to 2024, generating $629 billion in revenue.

Since a travel itinerary might serve different purposes for different kinds of travellers, it is crucial for a travel agent to know all the characteristics of her/his target of customers. A typical business traveller's itinerary might include information about meetings, events and contacts with some time for leisure travel, efficiently.

== Making of reservations ==
When a proposed itinerary has been finalised, the details need to be entered into an airline reservation system, where the appropriate reservations and bookings are made. In the industry, the travel plan is commonly known as the itinerary and the data on the reservation system is known as a passenger name record (PNR).

== See also ==
- Travel plan, a package of actions designed by an organisation to encourage safe, healthy and sustainable travel options
