= Identification of Fixed Objects in Public Transport =

IFOPT (Identification of Fixed Objects in Public Transport) is a CEN Technical Specification that provides a Reference Data Model for describing the main fixed objects required for public access to Public transport, that is to say Transportation hubs (such as airports, stations, bus stops, ports, and other destination places and points of interest, as well as their entrances, platforms, concourses, internal spaces, equipment, facilities, accessibility etc.). Such a model is a fundamental component of the modern Public transport information systems needed both to operate Public transport and to inform passengers about services. IFOPT has been revised and incorporated into Transmodel v6 – Part 2.

== Scope ==
IFOPT is itself built upon the CEN Transmodel standard and defines four related sub models.

- Stop Place Model: Describes the detailed structure of a Stop Place (that is stations, airports, ferry ports, bus stops, coach stations, etc., providing a point of access to public transport) including Entrances, pathways, and accessibility limitations.
- Point of Interest Model: Describes the structure of a point of interest (that is tourist attractions, leisure facilities, stadia, public buildings, parks, prisons, etc.) to which people may wish to travel by public transport) including physical points of access, i.e. Entrances.
- Gazetteer Topographical Model: Provides a topographical representation of the settlements (cities, towns, villages etc.) between which people travel. It is used to associate Stop and Station elements with the appropriate topographic names and concepts to support the functions of journey planning, stop finding, etc.
- Administrative Model. Provides an organisational model for assigning responsibility to create and maintain data as a collaborative process involving distributed stakeholders. Includes namespace management to manage the decentralised issuing of unique identifiers.

== Stop Places ==
The Stop Place model defines a conceptual model and identification principles for places of access (Stop Places) for all modes of transport (including airports, stations, ports, bus stops, coach stations, taxi ranks, etc.).

- It distinguishes all physical points of access to transport such as platforms, gates, quays, bays, stances, taxi ranks, and also other areas of an interchange such as booking halls, concourses, waiting rooms, etc.
- It describes the navigation paths between such points allowing the routing by journey planners.
- It can represent detailed accessibility data about access for wheelchair users, the visually impaired, and other categories of users with special needs, etc.
- It can also represent likely points of delay due to processes such as checkin, security, etc.
- Stop Places and their component elements can be assigned the names, labels and codes needed to identify them to the public in different contexts.
- Components can be associated with elements of other information layers such as the Road and Path Network to allow for integrated journey routing.

== See also ==
- Transmodel
- NaPTAN
- Transportation hub
- Intermodal Journey Planner

== History ==
IFOPT was originally developed between 2008 and 2011 as an extension to the Transmodel model and included both a conceptual model expressed in Unified Modeling Language and a W3C XML Schema. It developed a detailed access model for stations and points of interest.

- Between 2001 and 2012 a new more general Transmodel based schema NeTEx was developed which incorporated and extended the features of the IFOPT IFOPT schema as a uniform part of a data model for public transport stops and timetables.
- Starting in 2014 a program to update Transmodel was commenced and the IFOPT conceptual model was integrated into the Transmodel Part2 describing transport networks including stops, points of interest and other IFOPT concerns. Part 2 was published in 2016.
