= Real Time Information Group =

UK organization supporting public transport information systems development

The Real Time Information Group (also RTIG) is an organisation in the United Kingdom supporting the development of bus passenger information systems; its 40+ members include local authorities, bus operators, consultants and system suppliers together with representatives from the UK government.

The main output of the group is guidelines, standards, case studies and best practice documents. These documents are produced by RTIG on behalf of its members, usually with the assistance of specialist working groups.

== History ==
In 2000, when real-time information (RTI) systems were beginning to be considered by UK local authorities to provide travellers with up-to-the-minute bus arrival and departure passenger information, it was realised that cross-boundary bus services made it imperative to coordinate projects around the UK. Technical and operational standards would therefore be required. A group of local authorities and bus operators began to meet regularly to discuss how to achieve this; and so RTIG was born.

Substantial government funding for projects around the UK, in particular from 2002 to 2004, provided an enormous boost to the development of RTI systems. The expanding and maturing market caused RTIG to reflect on its role, and in 2003 it determined to recreate itself as a subscription group - with the important step that the systems industry was to be a full and equal partner in its work. Equally importantly, it has maintained excellent links with central UK Government, from whom the Group continues to receive project funding for work of national scope and importance.

The National RTI Strategy, ratified in March 2007, establishes a framework for how industry stakeholders and government need to work together to deliver benefit to passengers. RTIG's role has, as a consequence, been expanded to cover all aspects of technology in public transport, from systems to support disabled travellers through to safety and security systems.

In 2023 it became an independent not for profit organisation having to this point been a subsidiary of initially Greater Manchester Passenger Transport Executive and laterly Merseytravel.

== Annual survey ==
In 2002 the group produced the first UK Annual RTI Survey, which surveyed the use of RTI technology by local authorities and passenger transport executives across England, as well as plans for the following two years. In 2004 the survey was extended to include Wales and in 2005 Scotland.

In order to reflect the widening deployment of bus-related technologies, the 2006 annual survey was re-branded as the ‘RTIG Passenger Transport Technology Survey’ and included questions on services for disabled travellers – partly in response to new obligations on bus operators under the Disability Discrimination Act 2005. The 2007 survey continues to focus broadly on public transport and traffic management technology and has been expanded to include questions on bus CCTV and other security technologies.

The annual survey provides details on:

- Number of RTI equipped buses in Great Britain
- Number of RTI signs in GB
- Use of audio equipment on and off buses in GB
- Costs of implementing and maintaining RTI in GB
- Trends in integration of RTI with UTMC technology
- The provision of information for disabled travellers in GB
- Passenger and driver security systems (on and off bus)

The annual survey has been discontinued with the last being carried out in 2012.

== Working Groups ==
The majority of the documents, standards and guidelines produced by RTIG is done with the assistance of voluntary working groups. These working groups are made up of industry experts who lend their knowledge to particular projects. Examples of RTIG working groups include:

- Data Suppliers Working Group
- Shelter Implementation Working Group
- Disability Working Group
- On-bus architecture Working Group
- GPRS Interface Working Group

Working groups involve non-members where relevant; so, the Disability WG includes representatives from charities such a RNIB and Guide Dogs.

== The RTIG library ==
The RTIG library houses all of the documents produced by the group to date. These documents are held by RTIG electronically and distributed to members on request, or via the ‘members area’ of the RTIG website. The library catalogue is publicly available from the RTIG website .

Publicly available documents in the Library include:

- The RTIG National Strategy
- RTI and disabled travellers
- Managing Disruptions Series
- Business Case Study Report

Members have access to a wider range of standards and guidelines, and to the outputs of RTIG workshops (see below).

The group also publishes a monthly newsletter which provides both members and non-members with news on RTIG projects and events.

== RTIG workshops ==
RTIG runs regular workshops, which are held at a different UK venue each time. Each workshop has a central theme and attract presentations from a wide variety of stakeholders. Workshops will include an update on ITS news, an update on RTIG projects and working group activities, and a set of presentations based around the workshop theme.

Previous workshop venues (and their respective themes) include :

- Leeds (January 2006) – Marketing RTI
- Cardiff(April 2006) – Demand Responsive Transport and On-Bus Security
- London (July 2006) – The Financial Aspects of RTI
- Manchester (November 2006) – The Future of Technology in Public Transport
- Bristol (February 2007) – Standards and Specifications
- Sheffield (April 2007) – On and off bus security
- Lincoln (July 2007) – Bus operators' perspectives of RTI
- York (November 2007) - Integrating RTI

== RTIG involvement in international standards ==
RTIG have assisted in the development of a number of standards, including the Service Interface for Real Time Information (SIRI). RTIG have also developed a number of best practice guidelines.
