= Datex II =

- Filename extension: .xml
- Developed by: European Committee for Standardization
- Standard: CEN/TS 16157
- Website: Datex2

Datex II or Datex2 is a data exchange standard for exchanging traffic information between traffic management centres, traffic service providers, traffic operators and media partners. It contains for example traffic incidents, current road works and other special traffic-related events. These data is presented in XML-format and is modeled with UML. The standard is developed by the technical body Intelligent transport systems (CEN/TC 278) of the European Committee for Standardization.

The standard contains 12 parts:

1. Context and framework
2. Location referencing
3. Situation publication
4. Variable Message Sign (VMS) Publications
5. Measured and Elaborated Data Publications
6. Parking Publications
7. Common data elements
8. Traffic management publications and extensions dedicated to the urban environment
9. Traffic signal management publications dedicated to the urban environment
10. Energy infrastructure
11. Publication of machine interpretable traffic regulations
12. Facility related publications
