= Transport standards organisations =

Transport standards organisations is an article transport Standards organisations, consortia and groups that are involved in producing and maintaining standards that are relevant to the global transport technology, transport journey planning and transport ticket/retailing industry. Transport systems are inherently distributed systems with complex information requirements. Robust modern standards for transport data are important for the safe and efficient operation of transport systems. These include:

- Formal standards development organisations;
- Other international bodies developing definitive core specifications;
- Other important international bodies;
- Other National bodies developing definitive core specifications;
- Other important National bodies

== Formal standards development organisations ==
The formal development of international standards is organised in three tiers of Standards Development Organisations, recognised by international agreements :

- World: International Organization for Standardization or ISO. International Electrotechnical Commission or IEC
- Regional Regional Standards bodies coordinate standardisation between geographically or politically connected regions with a need to harmonise products and practices. For example, in Europe, the European Committee for Standardization or CEN
- National, e.g. Most Nations have a coordinating body responsible for organizing participation in CEN & ISO activities, for publishing ISO & CEN standards within the country, and for coordinating national standardisation activities. The National SDO in turn will delegate responsibility as appropriate to the relevant trade associations, government departments and other stakeholders for a specific are of technical expertise. For example, in the UK the British Standards Institution or BSI is the National SDO.

The SDOs conduct their work through a system of working groups, responsible for different areas of expertise. These evolve over time to accommodate changes in technology. key current working groups for transport standards are outlined below.

=== CEN Working Groups and leaders for Transport Standards ===
CEN Allocates responsibility for different areas of transport standardisation to working groups

- WG1 - Automatic Fee Collection and Access Control - CEN
- WG2 - Freight and Fleet Management System - ISO
- WG3 - Public Transport - ISO
- WG4 - TTI – Traffic and Traveller Information - ISO
- WG5 - TC - Traffic Control - ISO
- WG6 - Parking Management - n/a
- WG7/8 - Geographic Road Data Base: Road Traffic Data - ISO
- WG9 - Dedicated Short Range Communications - CEN
- WG10 - Man-machine Interface - n/a
- WG11 - Subsystem- Intersystem Interfaces - ISO
- WG12 - Automatic Vehicle and Equipment Identification - CEN
- WG13 - System Architecture and Terminology - ISO

=== ISO Working Groups and leaders for Transport Standards ===
ISO Technical Committee 204 is responsible for Transport Information and Control Systems. It has a number of standing Working Groups, which set up Subgroups from time to time.

Current ISO TC204 Working Groups, Work program & Countries that provide Secretariat are as follows

- WG1 Architecture - UK
- WG2 Quality and Reliability Requirements - Japan
- WG3 TICS Database Technology - Japan
- WG4 Automatic Vehicle Identification - Norway
- WG5 Fee and Toll Collection Holland
- WG7 General Fleet Management and Commercial and Freight - Canada
- WG8 Public Transport/Emergency - America
- WG9 Integrated Transport Information, Management, and Control - Australia
- WG10 Traveller Information Systems - UK
- WG11 Route Guidance and Navigation Systems - Germany
- WG14 Vehicle/Roadway Warning and Control Systems - Japan
- WG15 Dedicated Short Range Communications for TICS Applications - Germany
- WG16 Wide Area Communications/Protocols and Interfaces - America

For an up-to-date schedule of the remit of TC204, its current Working Groups and their points of contact please refer to:

The U.S. standards developing organization which is tasked with the domestic implementation of ISO TC204 Transport Standards, is the Telecommunications Industry Association.

== Other international bodies developing definitive core specifications ==
As well as the formal SDOs, a number of other international bodies undertake work that is important for Transport and Transport Information standards

- International Air Transport Association (IATA)
- International Union of Railways (UIC)
- Institute for Transportation and Development Policy (ITDP) which develops the BRT Standard
- European Broadcasting Union (EBU) - See TPEG
- World Wide Web Consortium (W3C)
- OpenTravel Alliance (OTA)
- Open Geospatial Consortium (OGC)
- Organization for the Advancement of Structured Information Standards (OASIS)
- railML.org Railway data standardisation body defining railML

=== Other important international bodies ===
- Object Management Group (OMG)
- EuroRoadS
- Media Oriented Systems Transport (MOST)
- European Railway Agency (ERA)

== National bodies developing definitive core specifications ==
=== German organisations active in Transport Standards development ===
- Verband Deutscher Verkehrsunternehmen (VDV)

=== UK organisations active in Transport Standards development ===
==== UK bodies developing definitive core specifications ====
- Department for Transport (DfT)
- Ordnance Survey (OS)
- Rail Settlement Plan (RSP)
- National Rail Enquiries (NRE)
- Integrated Transport Smartcard Organisation (ITSO)
- UTMC Development Group (UDG)
- Real Time Information Group (RTIG)
- Travel Information Highway (TIH)

==== Other important UK bodies and initiatives ====
- Transport for London
- National Traffic Control Centre (NTCC)
- Association of Transport Operating Officers (ATCO)
- Royal National Institute of Blind People (RNIB)
- Royal National Institute for Deaf People (RNID)
- Journey Solutions
- Oyster card

=== US bodies developing definitive core Transit Standard specifications ===
- National Transportation Communications for Intelligent Transportation System Protocol or NTCIP

== See also ==
- Standards organisations
