= Istria (disambiguation) =

Istria or Istrian may refer to:

- Istria, a large peninsula in northern Adriatic Sea shared by Croatia, Slovenia and Italy
  - Istria County, present-day county of Croatia whose territory includes almost 90 percent of the peninsula
  - Slovene Istria, present-day region of Slovenia which includes northwestern portion of the peninsula
  - March of Istria, a historical county located on the peninsula
  - Istrian identity, a historical identity in the region
- 183 Istria, an asteroid discovered in 1878 named after the peninsula
- Istria (Milan Metro), a subway station in Milan, Italy
- Istria, Constanța, a commune in Romania on the Black Sea
- Istria (river), a river in Constanța County, Romania
- Istria, an IYRU 15mR racing yacht designed by Charles Ernest Nicholson and launched in 1912

== See also ==
- Histria (disambiguation)
- Trieste (disambiguation)
