= Papercast Limited =

- Company type: Private limited company
- Industry: Technology; Transportation; Information Technology
- Headquarters: Baker Street, London, United Kingdom
- Area served: Europe, Middle East
- Services: Passenger information system; e-paper
- Website: papercast.com

Papercast Limited is a real-time passenger information technology for bus stops that uses solar powered e-paper displays. It displays real-time bus arrival information, bus timetables and other public transportation information.

== History ==
Papercast was founded in 2016. Papercast wirelessly delivers passenger information at bus stops to solar powered e-paper displays. To improve the accuracy of bus arrival predictions, the displays are controlled by a cloud-based management system with instant GTFS integration and automatic vehicle location(AVL) data normalisation. Papercast develops its own e-paper driver board.

In April 2019 Papercast was launched in Coffs Harbour, New South Wales (NSW) with BetterETA technology in collaboration with a local government initiative, led in partnership between Transport for NSW, local bus operator Busways, Coffs Harbour City Council and vehicle manufacturer EasyMile.

In 2018 the Jerusalem Transportation Master Plan Team in Israel used the company’ssolar powered, multi-language E Ink technology, electronic-paper bus stop displays.

In February 2018, E Ink Holdings partnered with Papercast Ltd to supply a solar powered e-paper passenger information display technology in Japan for a smart bus stop project.

Papercast solar powered e-paper bus stop displays are being trialed and are functional all over the world including, UK, Germany, Italy, USA, Japan and Kuwait etc.

In 2021, Papercast announced the deployment of 175 displays with the Department of Transport Abu Dhabi (DoT) and the Makkah Mass Rail Transit announced a public transport project that features 455 state-of-the-art bus stops with Papercast e-paper passenger information displays.

It later went on to launch a broader proposition to encompass real-time information, wayfinding, flow management and public safety in public spaces that include airports, rail stations, fuel stations, roadworks, events, shopping centres and hospitality venues. Papercast customers in approximately thirty countries.

In 2021, the Queen's Award for Enterprise gave Papercast its International Trade 2021 award.
