= Dura-Europos route map =

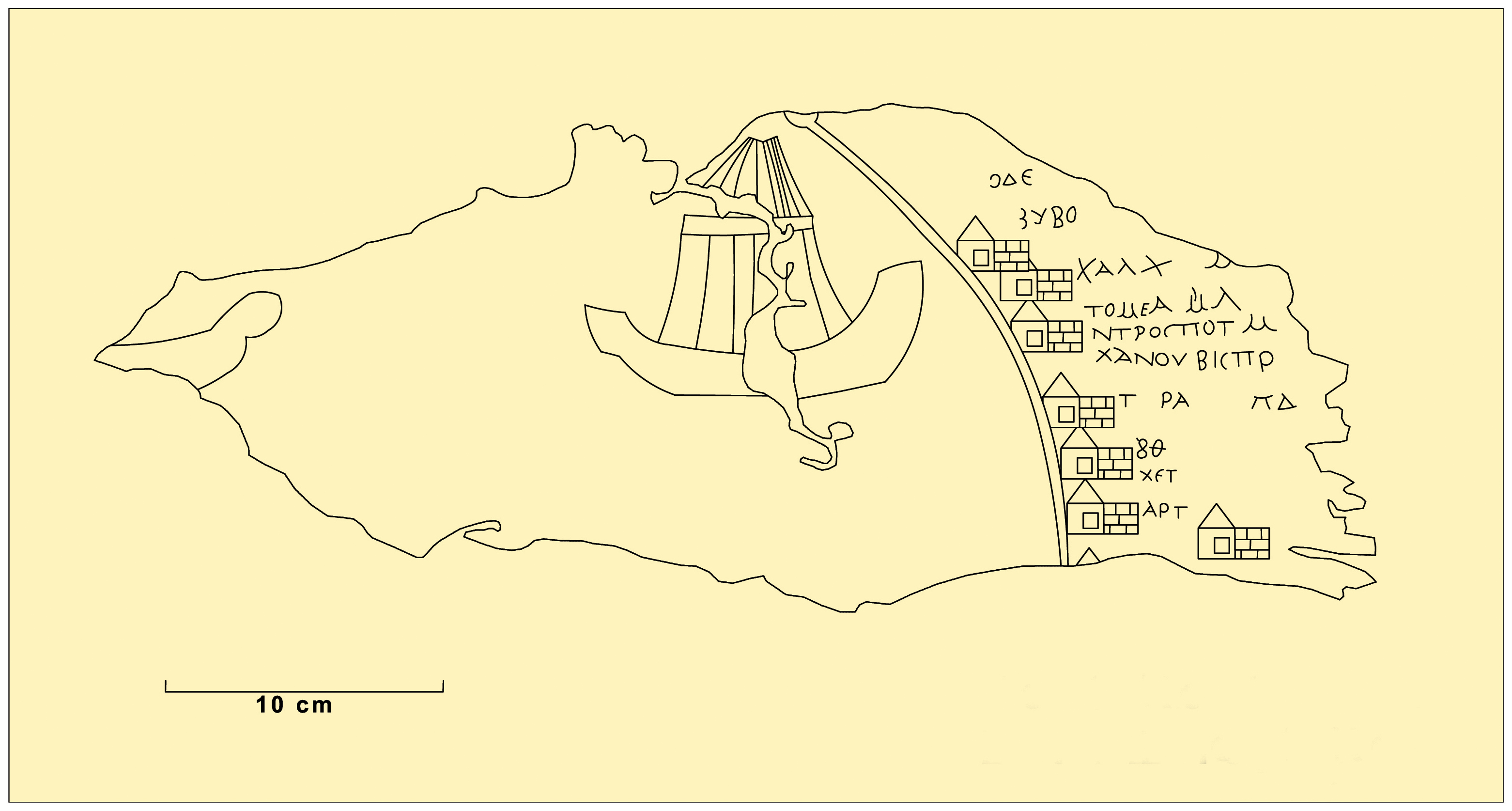
Route map drawing

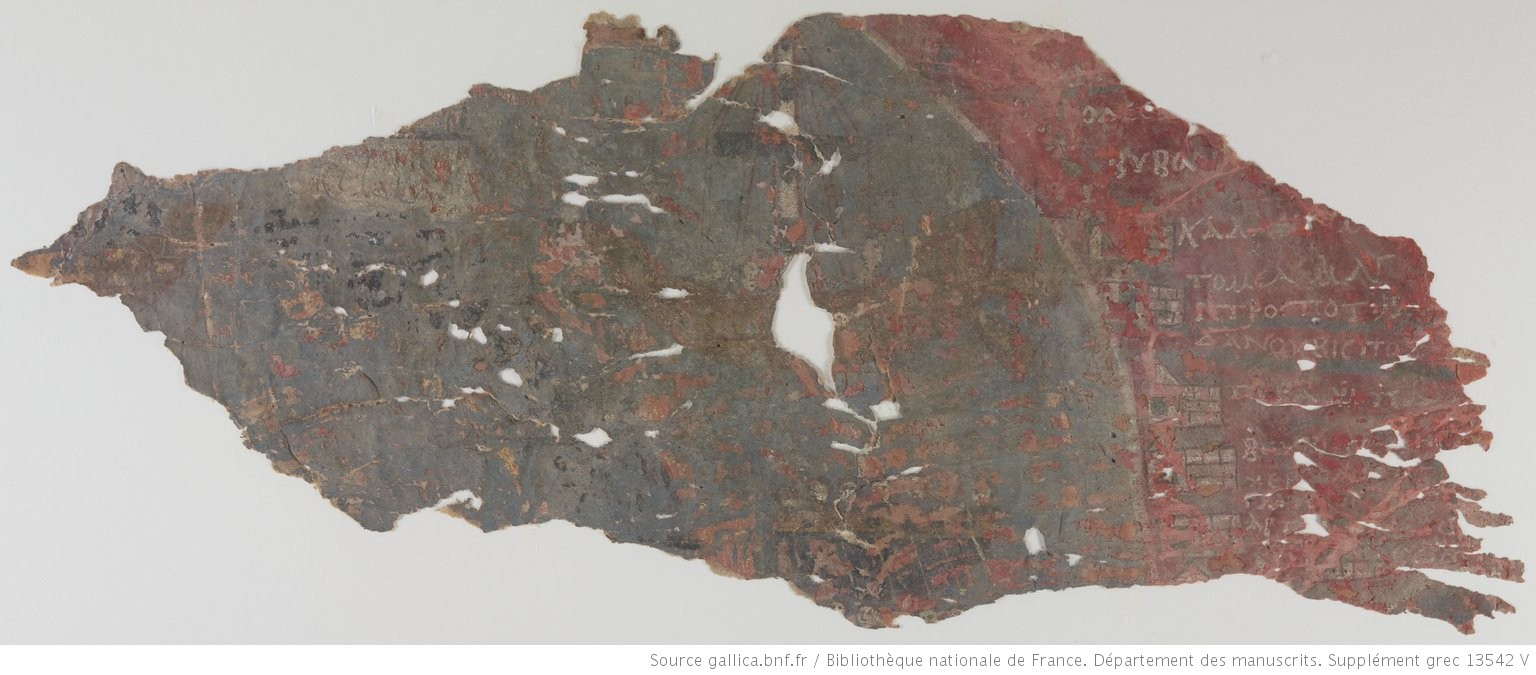
Route map photo

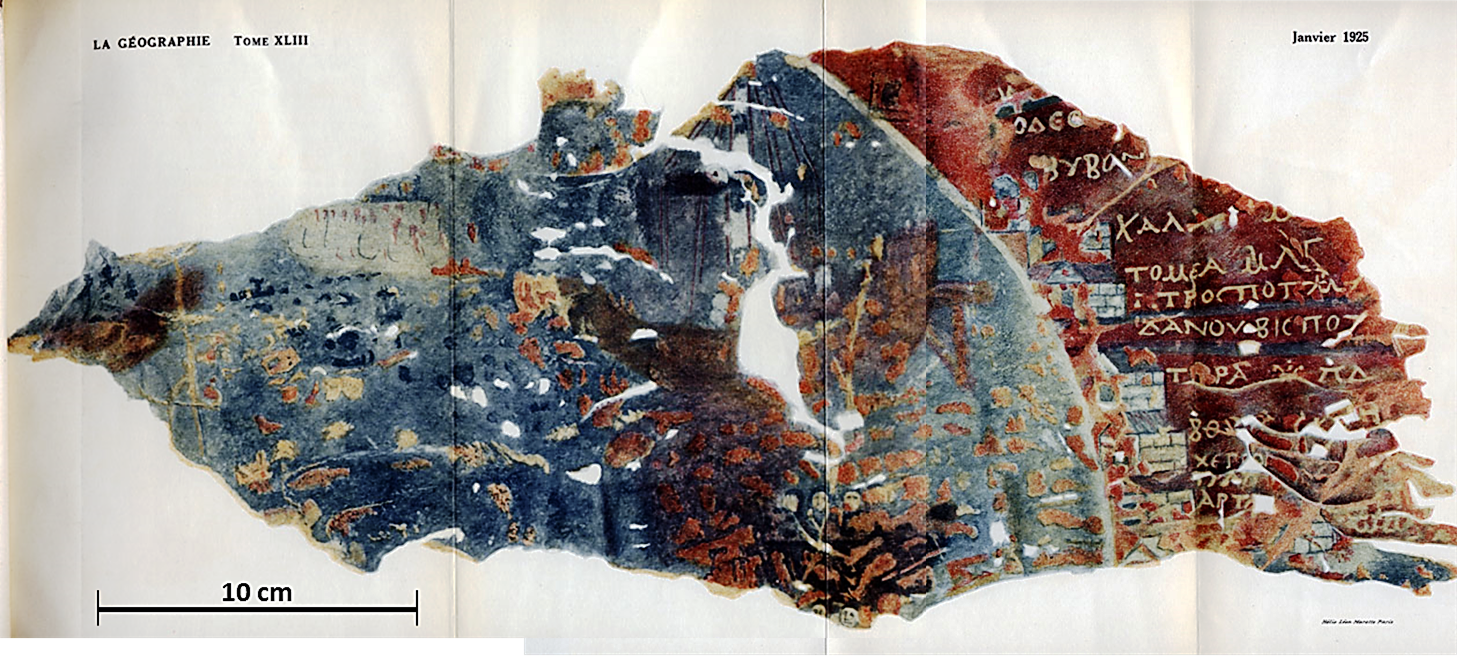
Route map with enhanced colors

The Dura-Europos route map, also known as stages map, is the fragment of a speciality map from Late Antiquity discovered 1923 in Dura-Europos. The map had been drawn onto the leather covering of a shield by a Roman soldier of the Cohors XX Palmyrenorum between AD 230 and AD 235. The fragment is considered the oldest map of (a part of) Europe preserved in the original.

The map is the only road map of antiquity preserved in the original; it is in the manuscript collection of the Bibliothèque nationale de France in Paris.

== Discovery ==
The Belgian archaeologist Franz Cumont discovered the map fragment during excavations in Dura-Europos in 1923 in the submerged "Tower of the Archers". The map is a fragment of leather or parchment, painted in colour, which had been found among the remnants of wooden oval shields. It was identified by Cumont as the remains of the leather cover of a laminated shield with remnants of the wooden parts of the shield still attached to the back. The map had been made by a Roman soldier, probably an infantryman or an archer of the Cohors XX Palmyrenorum, an auxiliary cohort stationed in Dura. This soldier drew the travel stages of his unit on the march through the Crimean on the leather cover of his shield somewhere between AD 230 and AD 235. Geographical inconsistencies may point towards the owner of the shield having commissioned somebody else with the drawing.

== Description ==
The preserved fragment of the map is 0.45 m × 0.18 m (17.7 in × 7.1 in). Cumont assumed that the map originally had had a width of 0.65 m (26 in). The depiction is divided by a semi-circular white line into two parts. This roughly drawn line represents the coastline of the western and northern coast of the Black Sea. To the left side of the coast, the open sea is represented in blue colour, with three ships on the fragment preserved. To the right of the coastline, the land is shown in reddish colour. Twelve places of the Black Sea region are named on the map, with the Latin names being used, but transcribed into Greek. To the right of each place name, distances were noted in Roman miles, comparable to the Itinerarium Antonini. The places themselves have been depicted symbolically, with the draughtsman using the same symbol - a building with a gabled roof - for all places.

It is very likely that the places mentioned are stages of a march of the Cohors XX Palmyrenorum. Two blue lines under the names Ἰστρος ποτ(αμός) and Δάνουβις ποτ(αμός) suggest rivers which were crossed during the march.

== Reconstruction of the stages ==
Greek colonies of the Euxinus Pontus (Black Sea), 8th - 3rd century BC

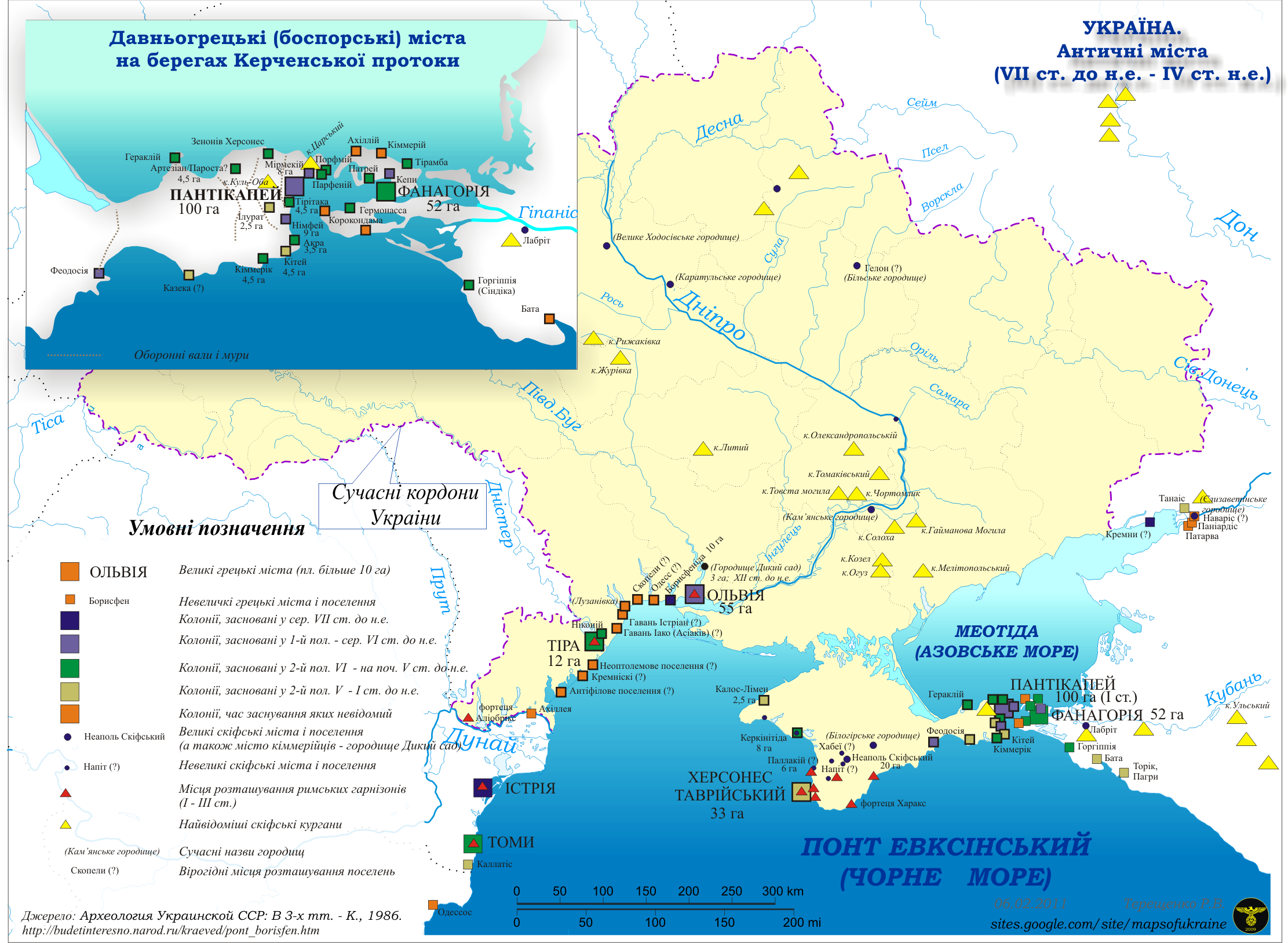
Ukraine. Ancient Greek colonies of the Northern Pontus Euxeinus (the Northern Black Sea), 7th c. BC - 4th c. AD

The list of stages of the preserved part of the map after Cumont is as follows:

Note: bold cheracters — readable, in square brackets — suggested unreadable, dots — suggested missing characters.

- Παν[υσος ποτ(αμός)? μί(λια) . .] — Panasos (river?), now Kamchiya, Bulgaria.
- Οδεσ[σός μί(λια) . .] — Odessus, now Varna, Bulgaria.
- Βυβόνα [μί(λια) . .] — Bybon, now Kavarna, Bulgaria (the only famous Bybon was an Ancient Greek athlete, become known by a sandstone carved with his name found in Olympia, Greece).
- Καλ[λ]ατις μί(λια) . . — Kallatis, now Mangalia, Romania.
- Τομέα μί(λια) λγ´ — Tomoi, now Constanța, Romania.
- Ἰστρος ποτ(αμός) μί(λια) μ´ — Istros (river), now Istria (river), Romania (also, at the time there was Histria (ancient city), near now Istria, Constanța, Romania).
- Δάνουβις ποτ(αμός) [μί(λια) . .] — Danube (river), Romania.
- Τύρα μί(λια) πδ´ — Tyras, now Bilhorod-Dnistrovskyi, Ukraine.
- Βορ[υ]σ[θέν]ης [μί(λια) . .] — Borysthenes, now Odesa, Ukraine (also possible other locations were are a crossing of the Dnieper river aka Borysthenes or Borysphen, or Borysthenes colony (near now Ochakiv portus in Dnieper–Bug estuary, Ukraine), in a turn also was a name the Pontic Olbia portus in the same area, at the time connected by the sea route with Chersonesos Taurica, a now ruined city in Crimea, Ukraine).
- Χερ[σ]όν[ησος . . . . ] — Chersonesos Taurica, now remains of Chersonesus Taurica near Sevastopol, in Crimea turned into the National historically archaeological Preserve of Tauric Chersonesos of Ukraine (further ruined since the Russian annexation of Crimea, 2014—present).
- Τραπ[εζοῦς . . . . .] — Trapezous, now Trabzon, Türkie (or the Chatyr-Dag mountain in now Crimea, Ukraine).
- Aρτα[ξάτα μί(λια) . .] — Artaxata, now Feodossija in Crimea, Ukraine.

The first part of the route corresponds to the route between Byzantium and the mouth of the Danube known from the Itinerarium Antonini and the Tabula Peutingeriana. Some of the cities are also mentioned in the Ravenna Cosmography. Following the map of Dura-Europos, the Danube is crossed after modern Histria and then advances into regions in which the Itinerarium Antonini and the Tabula Peutingeriana do not record any Roman roads.

== Cartographic Characteristics ==
The fragment shows that the route map was oriented to the west. This is indicated by the direction of the writing and the arrangement of the décor. In addition to that, the westernmost point of the map, the river Panysus, is on the upper edge of the map, while the easternmost point, the place Ardabda, is on the lower edge. This orientation to the west is unique in Roman cartography, as all other known maps were oriented to the east, towards the sunrise.

== Dating ==
The dating of the map fragment can be narrowed to the first half of the 3rd century. The Cohors XX Palmyrenorum is confirmed to have been in Dura-Europos in AD 230 by a dedication to the Roman Emperor Alexander Severus, which gives us a starting date. After the Roman defeat in the battle of Edessa in AD 260, the Roman presence was all but forced out of the Black Sea region. One city named in the map, Histria, already had fallen to the Goths in AD 238, after severe riots in the region following the death of Alexander Severus in March of AD 235. A military march through this region after AD 235 or 238 at the latest seems unlikely. These facts give us a time frame for the creation of the route map of five years between AD 230 and 235.

== Perception, importance and whereabouts ==
After its discovery by Cumont, the route map was soon forgotten again.

The oldest map, related to the actual ukr. territories, is a map of Чорного м. (from Varna to Kerch) with grc. titles, preserved on the shield of rom. warmen, found in Dura Europos on Eufrat; this map at all is the oldest cartography artifact antique age in the World cartography.

— Encyclopedia of Ukraine (in Ukrainian), Paris, New-York, 1959, Ukrainian: "Картографія", lit. 'Cartography'

In 2004, Cumont, in his publication of the weapons and military equipment of Dura-Europos, mentions the map, but doubts that the fragment was part of a Roman shield. Only Nabbefeld took the map up again in 2008. In addition to its importance for the history of ancient cartography, the map is also important for military history, as it is evidence that Roman military units were present in southern Ukraine until the Gothic invasion after AD 260 and that the city of Artaxata (today Feodossija) must still have been under Roman control at that time.
