= Road map =

Map that displays roads and transport links

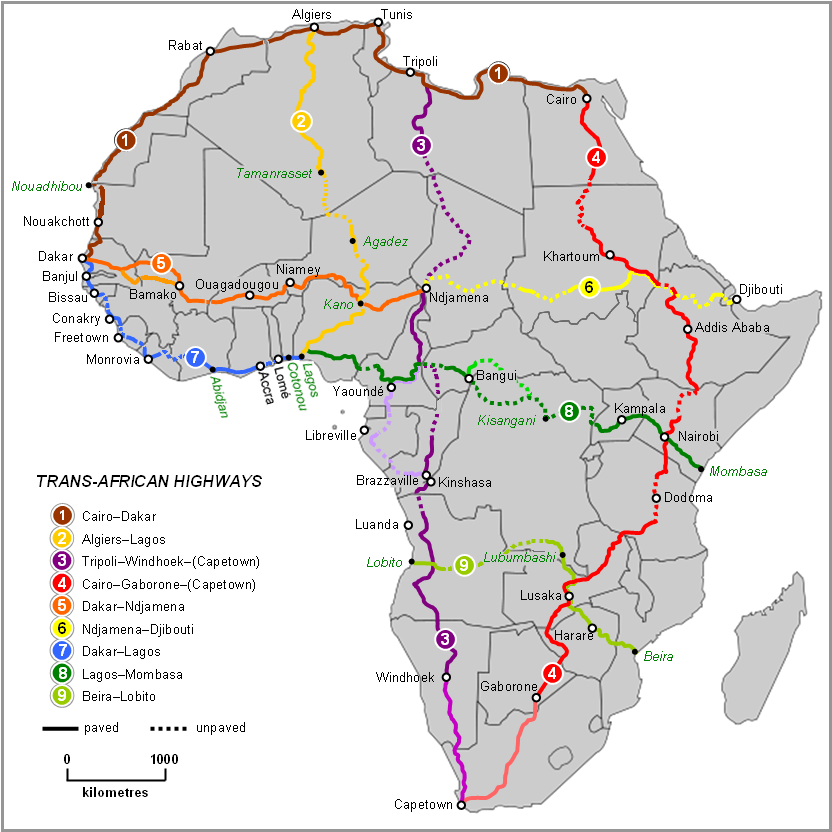
A map of the Trans-African Highway network

A road map, route map, or street map is a map that primarily displays roads and transport links rather than natural geographical information. It is a type of navigational map that commonly includes political boundaries and labels, making it also a type of political map. In addition to roads and boundaries, road maps often include points of interest, such as prominent businesses or buildings, tourism sites, parks and recreational facilities, hotels and restaurants, as well as airports and train stations. A road map may also document non-automotive transit routes, although often these are found only on transit maps.

== History ==
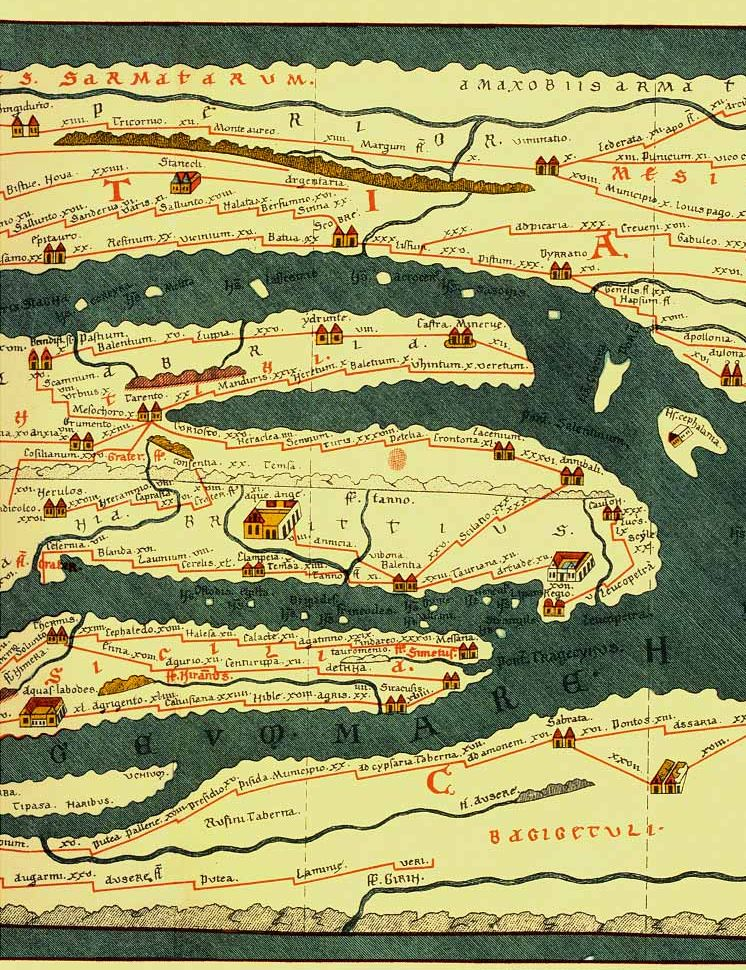
A portion of the Tabula Peutingeriana

The Turin Papyrus Map is sometimes characterized as the earliest known road map. Drawn around 1160 BC, it depicts routes along dry river beds through a mining region east of Thebes in Ancient Egypt.

The Dura-Europos Route map is the oldest known map of (a part of) Europe preserved in its original form. It is a fragment of a map drawn onto a leather portion of a shield by a Roman soldier in c. 235 AD. It depicts several towns along the northwest coast of the Black Sea.

The Tabula Peutingeriana, a copy of a scroll originally dating to about 350 AD, plots the extent of the Cursus publicus, the Roman road network that ran from Europe and North Africa to West Asia. It is highly schematic, compressing the Mediterranean Sea to a sliver and orienting the Italian Peninsula to run east-west.

The Gough Map, dating to about 1360, is the oldest known road map of Great Britain.

In 1500, Erhard Etzlaub produced the "Rom-Weg" (Way to Rome) Map, the first known road map of medieval Central Europe. It was produced to help religious pilgrims reach Rome for the occasion of the "Holy Year 1500".

In 1675, John Ogilby issued his Britannia atlas, in the form of a strip map for each major route. One hundred strip road maps are shown, accompanied by a double-sided page of text giving additional advice for the map's use, notes on the towns shown, and the pronunciations of their names. The roads were measured using a surveyor's wheel and plotted at one inch to the statute mile (1:63,360), an Ogilby innovation. The maps include such details as the configurations of hills, bridges, and ferries and the relative size of towns.

The American Automobile Association produced its first road map in 1905, a hand-drawn route on linen, depicting roads in Staten Island, N.Y. A year later, AAA became the official sponsor of "The Official Automobile Blue Book". The book was the first collection of generalized road maps spanning Boston, New York, Baltimore, Washington and Philadelphia and was created by AAA Secretary Charles Howard Gillette. AAA then established a Bureau of Touring Information in 1906, to supply members with all available data on roads, hotels, service facilities and motor vehicle laws. In 1911, AAA produced its first interstate map, “Trail to Sunset,” a booklet of strip maps detailing a route from New York to Jacksonville, Fla.

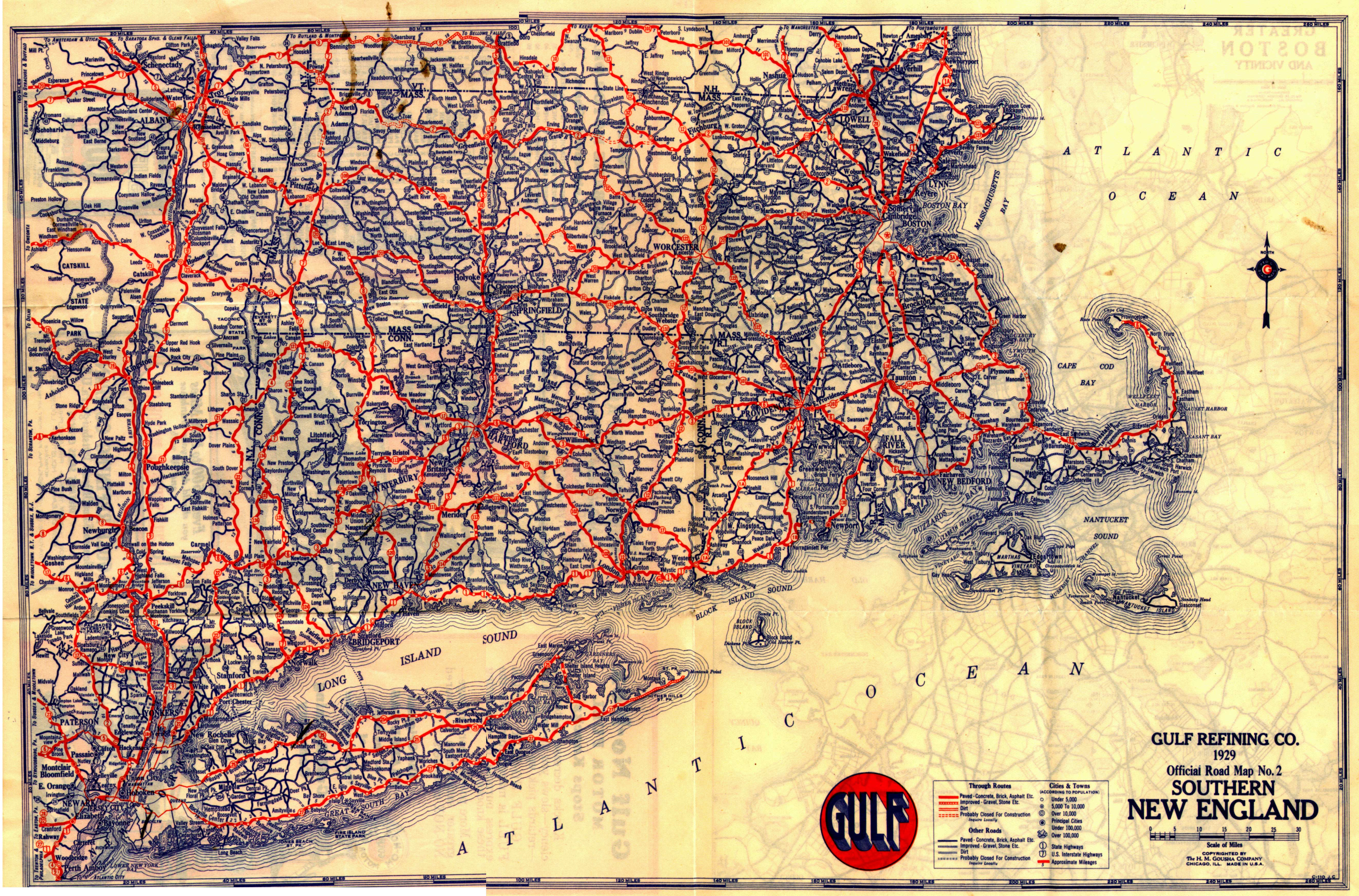
A 1929 map of New England produced by Gousha for Gulf Oil

Rand McNally's first road map, the New Automobile Road Map of New York City & Vicinity, was published in 1904. Gousha was founded in 1926 by former Rand McNally employees. General Drafting was founded in 1909. These three companies produced most of the approximately eight billion free maps handed out at American filling stations over a period of about 1920 to 1980. The practice of offering free maps diminished considerably in the 1970s.

The first Michelin map was produced in 1910.

With the rise of GPS navigation and other electronic maps in the 21st century, the use of printed maps is waning.

=== Itineraria ===
An alternative to, and in many ways the precursor of the road map, was the itinerarium, a listing of towns and other stops, with intervening distances. The Tabula Peutingeriana, mentioned above, is in effect an itinerarium in visual form, offering routes and distances with little geographical accuracy.

== Types ==
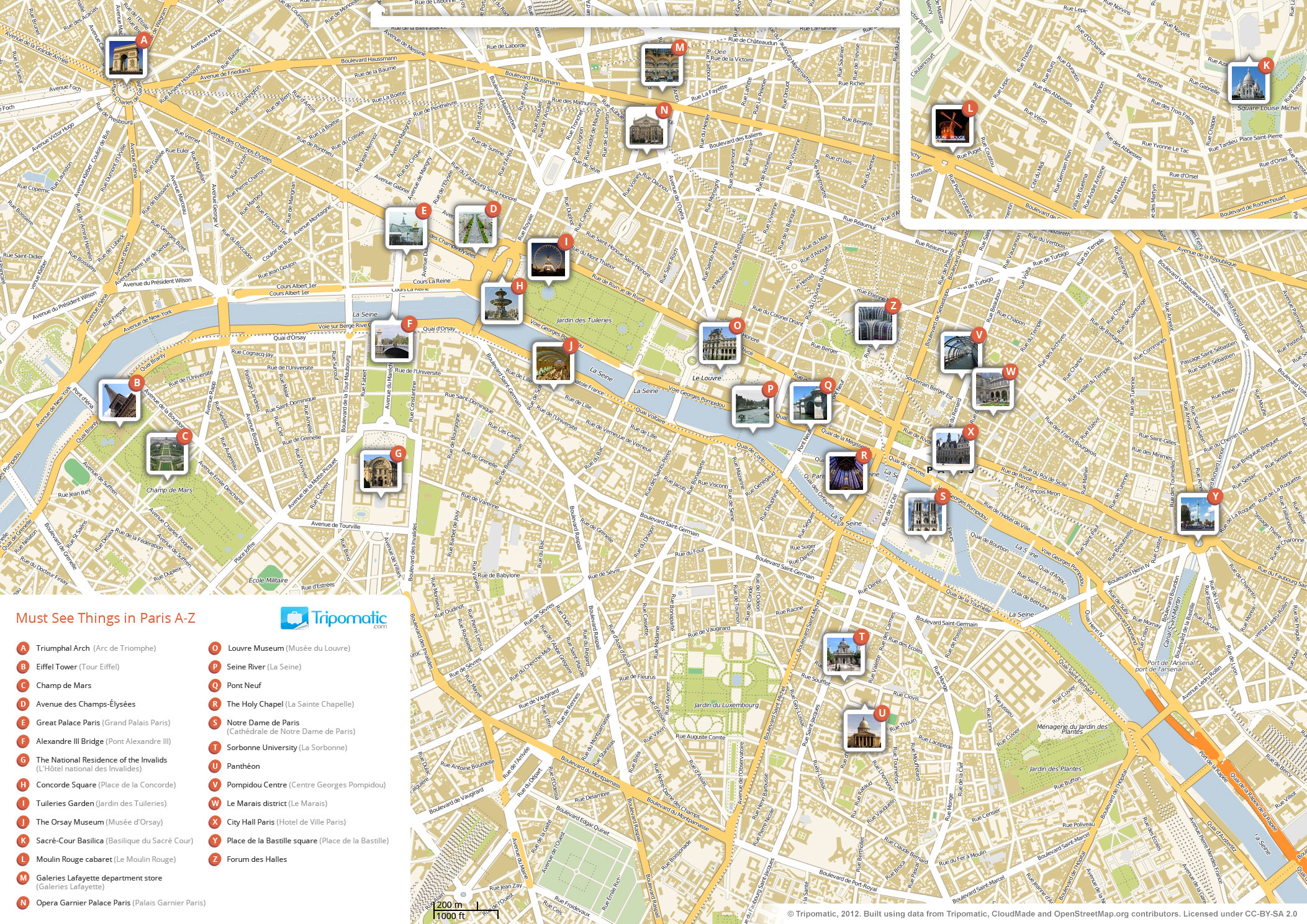
A street map of Paris

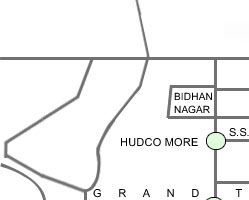
A simple schematic road map

Road maps come in many shapes, sizes and scales. Small, single-page maps may be used to give an overview of a region's major routes and features. Folded maps can offer greater detail covering a large region. Electronic maps typically present a dynamically generated display of a region, with its scale, features, and level of detail specified by the user.

Road maps can also vary in complexity, from a simple schematic map used to show how to get to a single specific destination (such as a business), to a complex electronic map, which may layer together many different types of maps and information – such as a road map plotted over a topographical 3D satellite image (a viewing mode frequently used within Google Earth).

Highway maps generally give an overview of major routes within a medium to large region ranging from a few dozen to a few thousand miles or kilometers.

Street maps usually cover an area of a few miles or kilometers (at most) within a single city or extended metropolitan area. City maps are generally a specialized form of street map.

A road atlas is a collection of road maps covering a region as small as a city or as large as a continent, typically bound together in a book. Coil binding or Spiral binding is a popular format for road atlases, to permit lay-flat usage and to reduce wear and tear. Atlases may cover a number of discrete regions, such as all of the federated states or provinces of a given nation, or a single continuous region in high detail split across several pages.

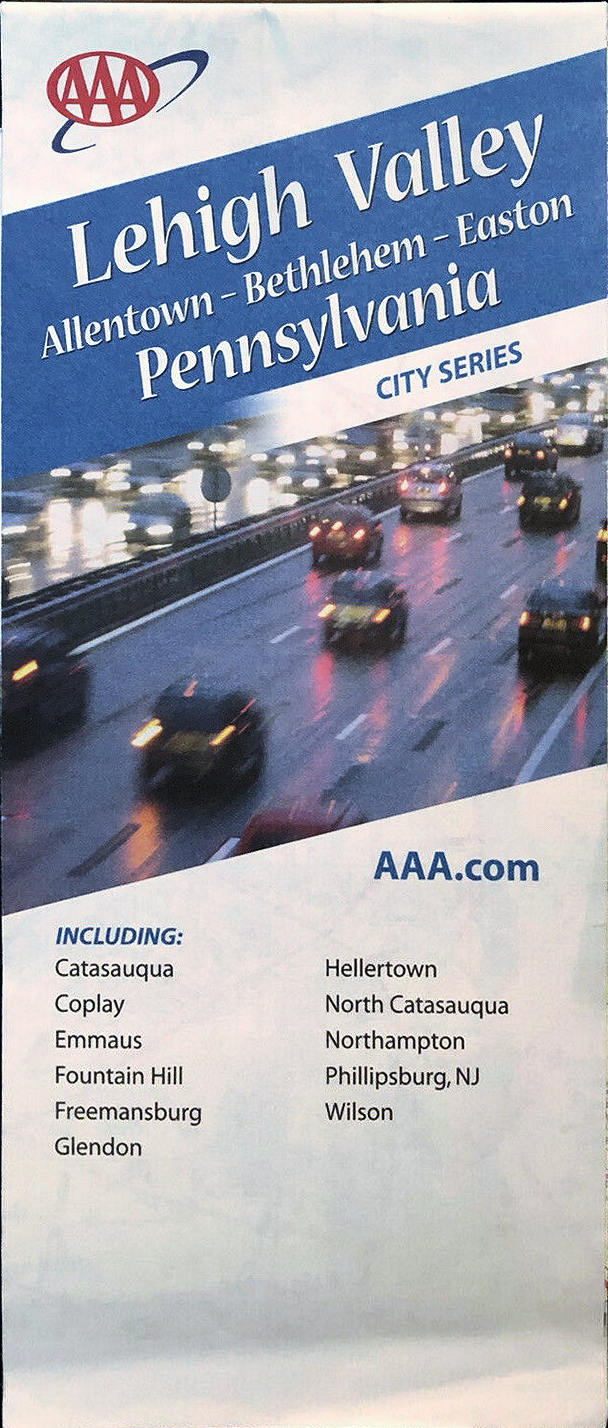
American Automobile Association atlas

Many motoring organisations, especially those in the European Union, North America, Australia and New Zealand produce road maps.

In addition, many transport companies, such as train and airline companies, have published "road" maps in the past, in their case usually calling them "route map". In the past, these were usually published on print paper; since the advent of the internet, transport companies have used it increasingly to show their route maps instead of paper material in order to lower costs. Many old route maps are now considered collectible items and command increasing prices on auction sites and houses and on antique stores.

== Common features ==
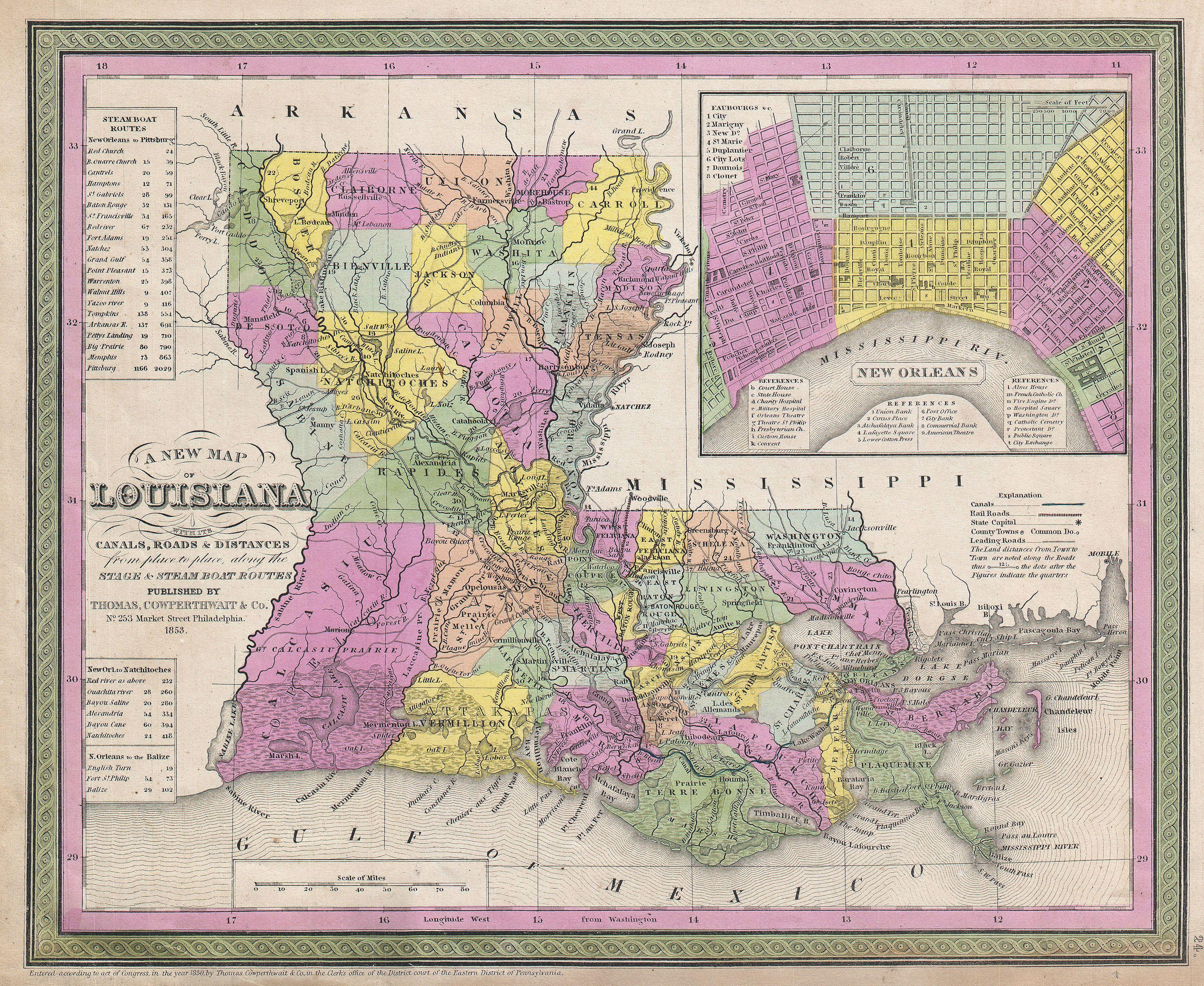
An 1853 map of Louisiana with an inset street map of New Orleans

Road maps often distinguish between major and minor thoroughfares (such as motorways vs. surface streets) by using thicker lines or bolder colors for the major roads.

Printed road maps commonly include an index of cities and other destinations found on the map; smaller-scale maps often include indexes of streets and other routes. These indexes give the location of the feature on the map via a grid reference.

Inset maps may be used to provide greater detail for a specific area, such as a city map inset into a map of a state or province.

Often a distance matrix is included showing the distance between pairs of cities. Since it is a symmetric matrix, only the upper triangle is displayed.

== See also ==
- Bicycle map
- Linear referencing
- Transit map
- Geographers' A–Z Map Company
- Ordnance Survey
- Timetable
- Airline timetable
