= General Drafting =

American map publisher, principally of road maps

General Drafting Corporation of Convent Station, New Jersey, founded by Otto G. Lindberg in 1909, was one of the "Big Three" road map publishers in the United States from 1930 to 1970, along with H.M. Gousha and Rand McNally. Unlike the other two, General Drafting did not sell its maps to a variety of smaller customers, but was the exclusive publisher of maps for Standard Oil of New Jersey, later Esso and Exxon. They also published maps for Standard Oil Company of Kentucky a.k.a. KYSO. KYSO later merged with Standard Oil Company of California better known as Chevron and SOCAL primarily used The H.M. Gousha company for their roadmaps.

Lindberg was a young immigrant from Finland and, with a borrowed drafting board and a $500.00 loan from his father, the then 23-yr. old started the business of "any and all general draughting" at 170 Broadway in NYC in 1909. As the firm started to prosper, the company secured its first contract from the American Automobile Association for "road maps," a harbinger of the future for the small company in 1911. In 1914, Lindberg incorporated and became the first chairman of the board, a position he would hold until his death in 1968.

In 1923, Lindberg persuaded Standard Oil of New Jersey to let him draw the "best" road map of the state that they had ever seen, for free distribution. Standard was sufficiently impressed with the product to contract with General Drafting to make all their road maps—a relationship that lasted for another six decades. The company's cartography was generally regarded as "an outstandingly attractive road map design, unexcelled in the U.S." The company also created exquisite maps for some special publications such as "These United States - Our Nation's Geography, History and People", published by Reader's Digest in 1968.

When oil companies stopped providing free maps, General Drafting tried to expand into retail map production, and continued to make maps for Exxon to sell; but its fortunes declined, and in 1992 it was purchased by Langenscheidt and absorbed into the American Map Company; its state maps became the "Travelvision" lineup for that company.
