= Bicycle map =

Map genre with focus on bicycles

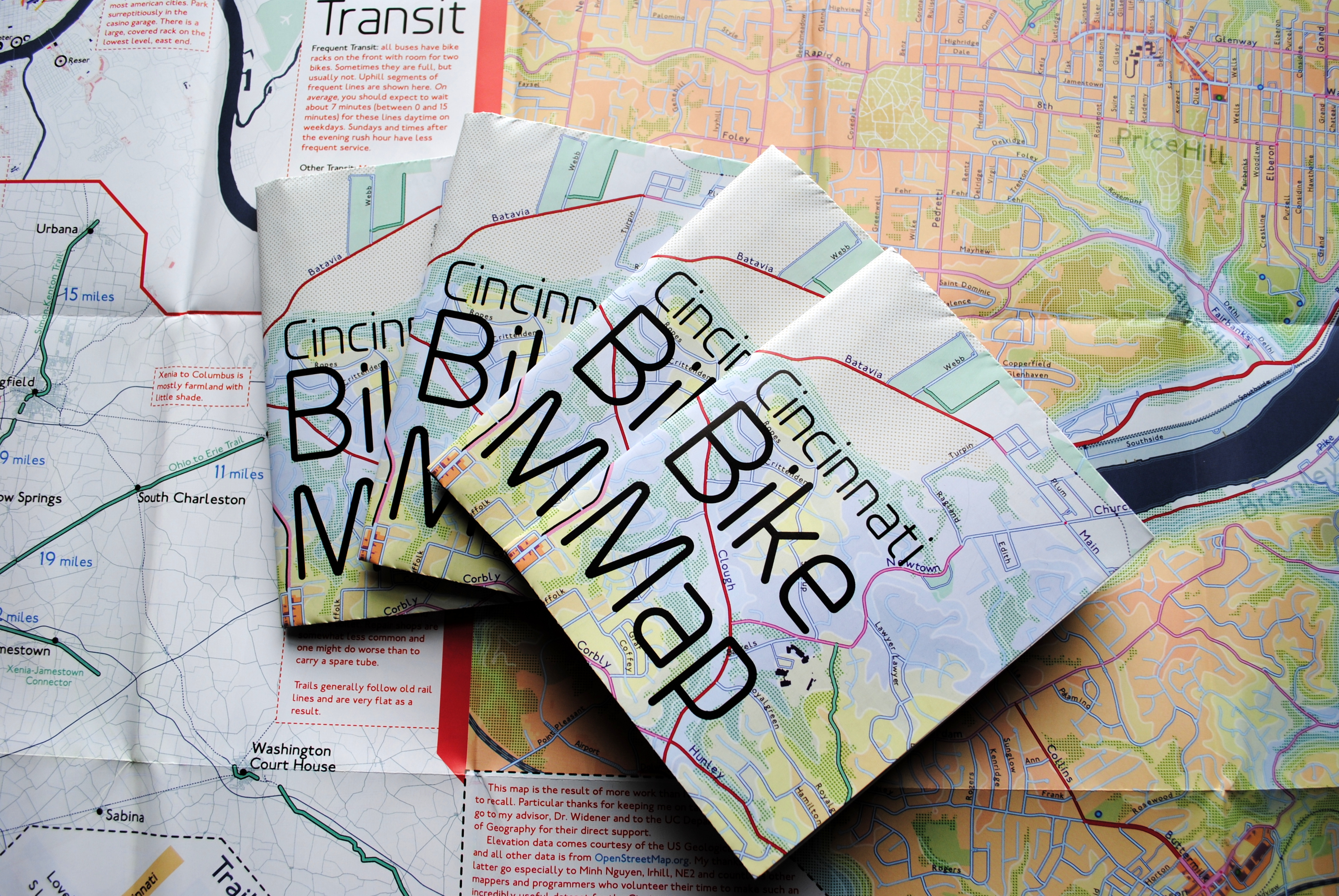
A printed bicycle map of Cincinnati.

A bicycle map, also known as a bike map, is a specialized map designed to assist cyclists in navigating urban, suburban, or rural areas safely and efficiently. It typically highlights bike lanes, dedicated bike paths, shared roads, and other infrastructure that accommodates bicyclists. These maps may also include information on elevation changes, points of interest, bike racks, repair stations, and traffic conditions relevant to cyclists. Bicycle maps aim to provide cyclists with essential information for route planning, to promote cycling as a mode of transportation, and to enhance the overall biking experience by ensuring accessibility and safety.

Bike maps have been always been used to suggest where recreational cyclists might like to ride. They also help commuters and racers to find their way. City departments of transportation (DOTs) have aimed to “encourage cycling primarily as a replacement for car trips” and recognize that most will bike to get somewhere rather than for a leisurely ride. Maps, whether in a physical format or via the internet, provide the cyclist with a wide range of data on street conditions and available paths. Unlike street maps, bike maps often include features such as topographical features (ex: major hills), bike shops, and pavement quality. Often countries will also update bike maps based on the interest of the public in that area. Evaluation methodologies and map designs are helpful in designing cycle maps in other cities.

== History ==
The invention of the safety bicycle brought about a bike boom in the late 19th century. Street maps available prior to this time period showed roads, but often emphasized railway lines, omitting information of particular relevance to cycling, e.g. pavement quality, hills, etc. Most bike maps of this period emphasize pavement quality, serving a dual role. On one hand they advised cyclists about roads good for cycling, and on the other they implicitly criticized the agencies responsible for the maintenance of public roads as part of an organized campaign to improve pavements. For both purposes, a simple rating as either ‘good’ or ‘bad’ was allocated to roads. Many of these maps, in America at least, were produced by a single organization, the League of American Wheelmen.

Early bicycling maps were made by drawing bicycling routes following mule and foot paths. In the early 20th century, motorcars quickly supplanted most travel by bicycle. Bike maps, like the bicycle itself, largely stagnated for several decades.

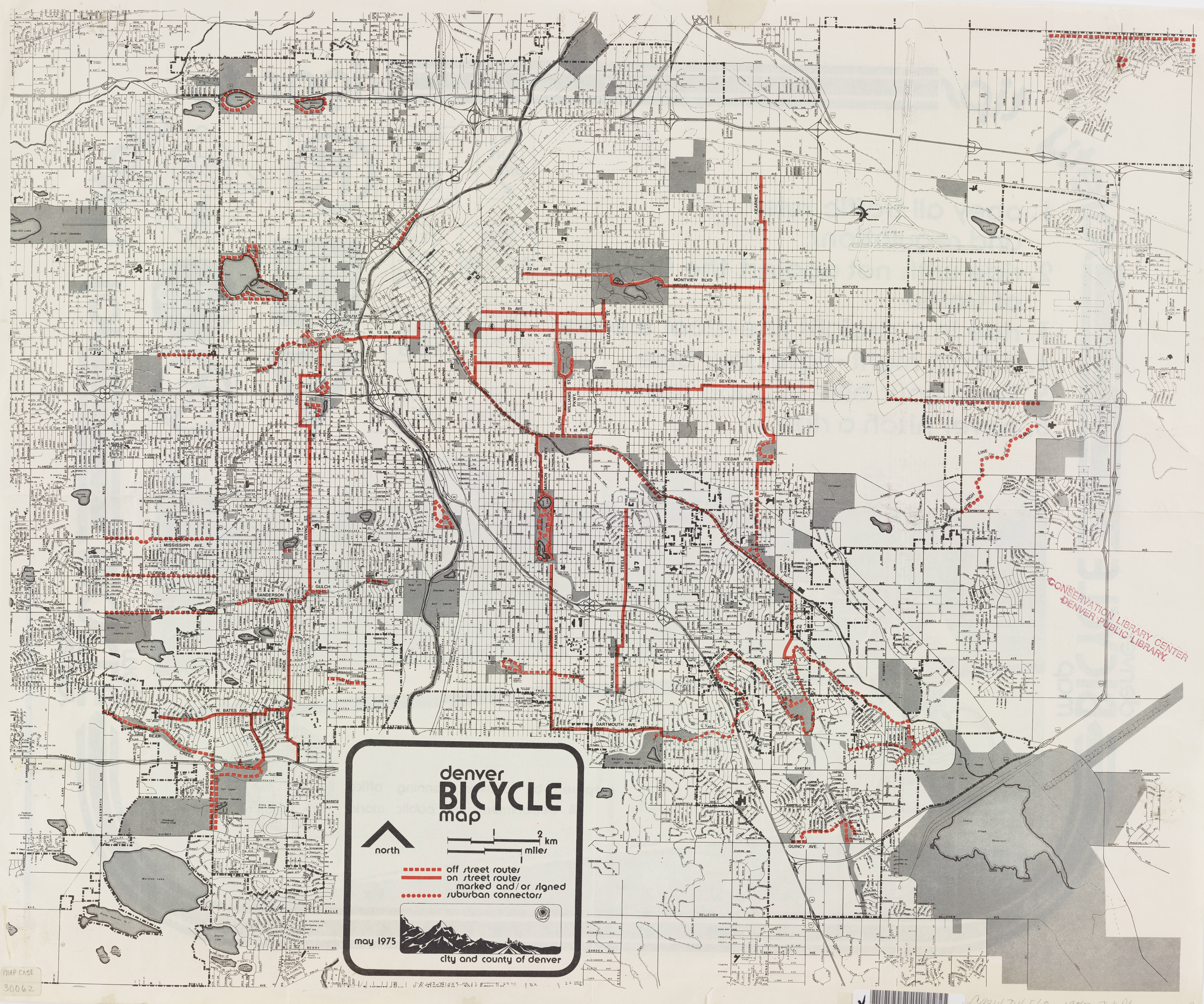
1975 cycling map of Denver Colorado

The United States has had its second bike boom following the increased interest for cycling from baby boomers. Their interest came from European bike racing, affinity for the environment, and personal health. The development of maps was not at the same pace as the increase in cyclists: they provided minimal biking routes. The 1970s bike boom led to the creation once again of cycling maps for the general public, but in the meantime, the nature of most cycling trips had shifted rather dramatically as cities were being reorganized around cars. Many maps of this period emphasised the recreational dimension of cycling, highlighting recreational routes and a limited range of off-street trails. 2000–10s

In the 2010s bike maps were expanded. American policy makers demanded a separated bike lanes and car roads. Despite this, more bike lanes have been created but most roads for bicycling on maps are shared with car roads. Merged bike paths and car roads are preferred for cities with smaller vehicles like in Europe.

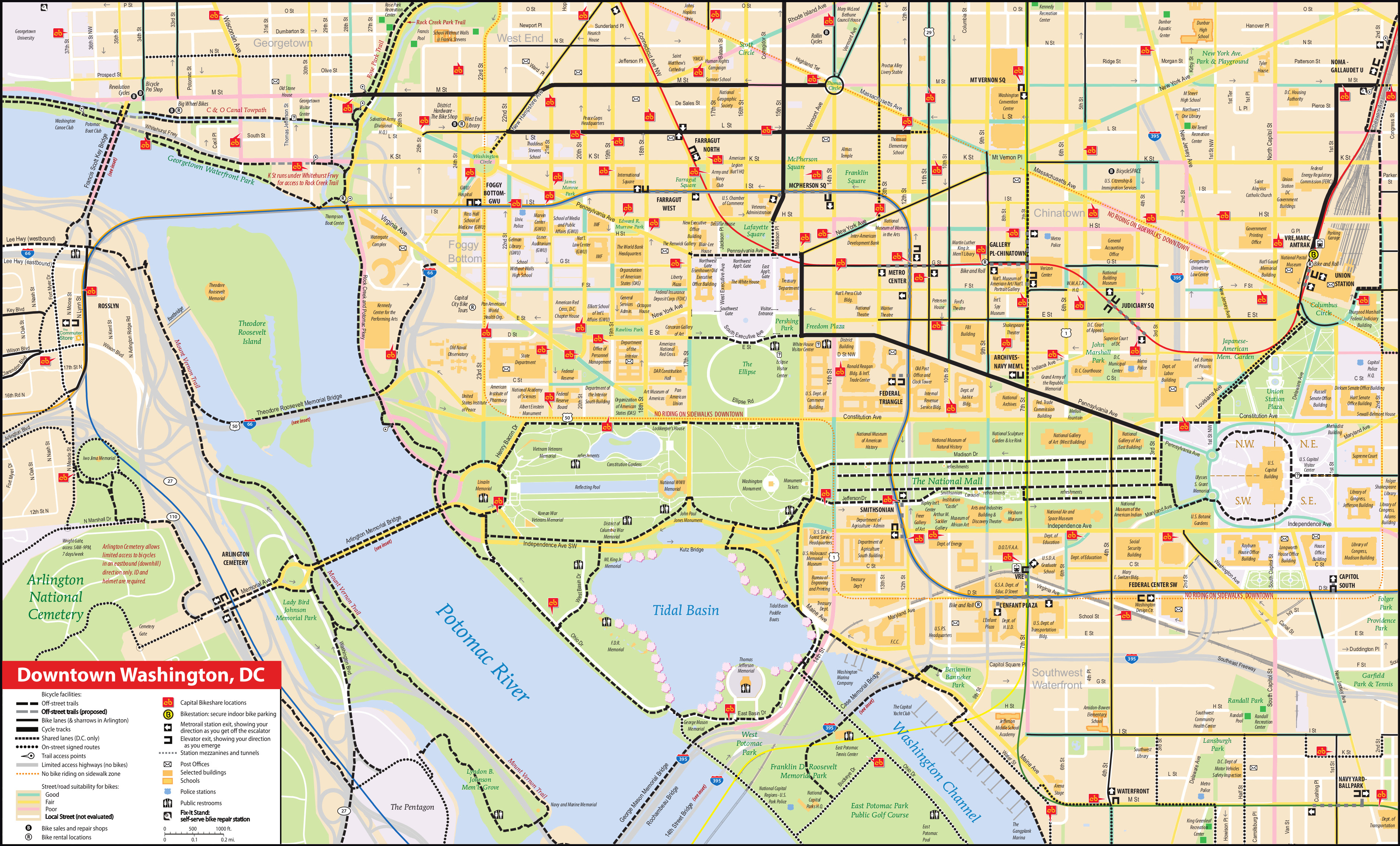
2016 bike map showing the area around the national mall in DC

Today, many cities or local advocacy groups produce bicycle maps. Often this still takes the form of a full-size paper map, but increasingly, online maps and automatic wayfinding applications have become commonplace. Numerous such applications have been developed around the needs and interests of cyclists.

== Bike routing webmaps ==
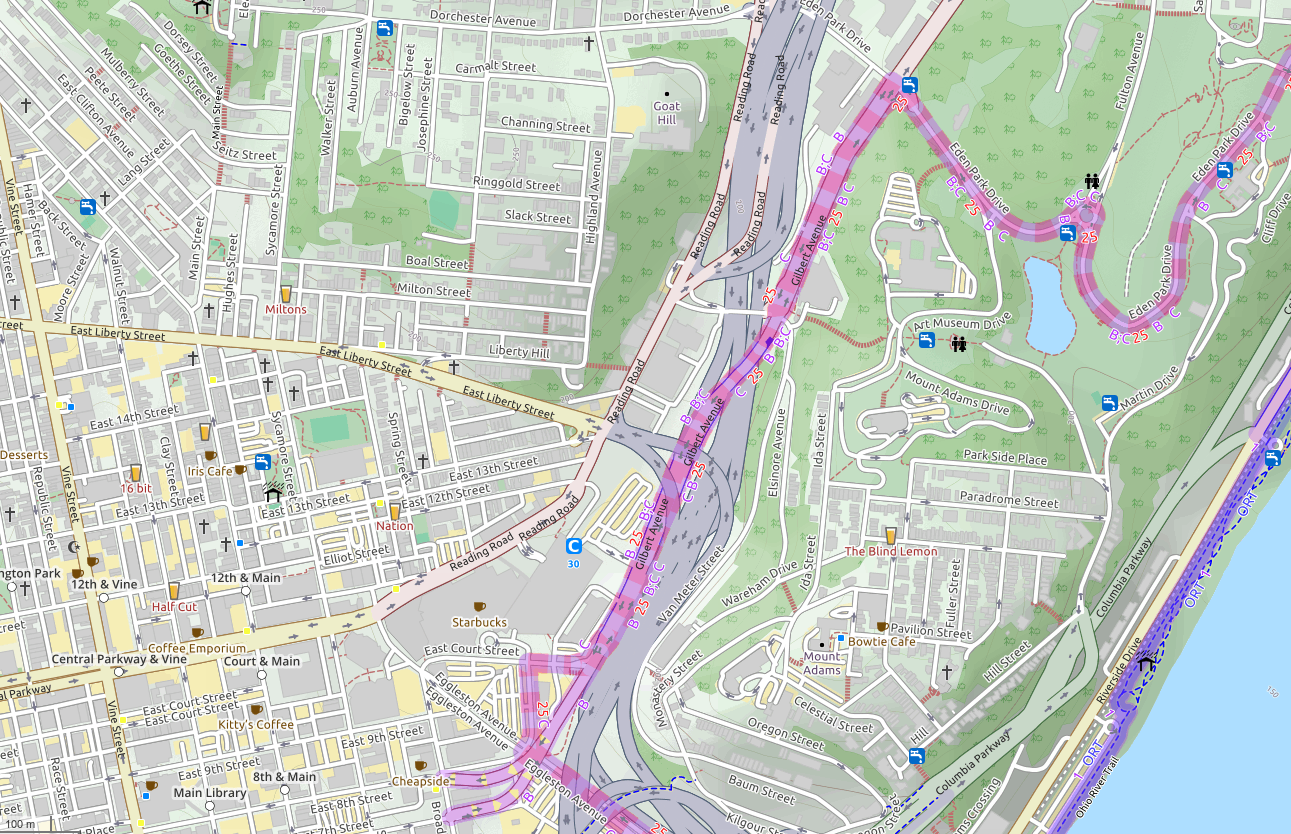
Screen capture of OpenStreetMap's cycling layer showing a location near downtown Cincinnati, Ohio.

A great variety of web-based route planning tools have been developed in the last couple of decades. In recent years, these have become increasingly multi-modal in nature, offering directions for cyclists, pedestrians, transit users, etc. Routing instructions for cyclists are now included in major web map services such as Google Maps, and OpenStreetMap, but not in other major competitors such as Bing maps, Apple Maps, etc.

Geographic information systems (GIS) like Google Maps and Apple Maps have integrated bike routes to their interfaces. These applications serve as bike maps since they can route cyclists, show road conditions, and have options to bypass busy roads and hills. Online bike maps are useful to denote service stations and dangerous areas that change over time since users can input data through programs like Bikemaps.org and Opencyclemap.org.

Web-based mapping efforts have often been hampered by the lack of detailed data on street conditions of interest to cyclists, and even of basic infrastructure like bikeways and lanes. One promising development in this area is the rapid growth of OpenStreetMap. Many of the first OpenStreetMap contributors were avid cyclists and OpenStreetMap offers some of the most detailed data on bike routes and bike infrastructure in much of the world. Open-source tools like OpenTripPlanner and the Open Source Routing Machine have developed fairly advanced routing algorithms that can make use of OpenStreetMap data to offer turn by turn directions for cyclists.

== Types ==
Bike maps may be physical, or digital. The physical media include classic paper maps, and Dedicated Light Maps (pre-coded bike route on a ‘T’ shape device, signaling direction through flashing lights on respective ends of the ‘T’) . Digital media include moving map displays (apps that track cyclists on map) and Auditory Maps (apps with auditory directions).

Paper Maps have certain disadvantages. Compared to Dedicated Light Maps, Moving Maps, and Auditory Maps, they are less stimulating on senses such as vision and audition. The lack of stimulation also plays a role in its effectiveness: it demands greater mental efforts from the user. This mental effort impairs the cyclist's performance and leads to greater risks on the road. As a navigation tool, it does not show where the user is. Cyclists must take their eyes off the road and mentally rotate the North-up displayed maps to locate themselves. This mental effort has the highest fixation per glance of all mediums, consequently depriving cyclists attention off the road and onto their physical Paper Maps.

High stimulation maps of Dedicated Light Maps, Moving Maps, and Auditory Maps, are all more effective and sound for bicycle riders. Contrary to the Paper Map, each demand for a lower fixation glance per second and mental effort for directions. Dedicated Light Maps provide directions via light signals on a device. Users receive simple and quick cues to arrive at their destination. The issue is that they lack their position in their spatial environment. Moving Maps have such an ability as they are a visual and interactive representation of the bicycle maps and user. Moving Maps as well have additional information of the surroundings (e.g. street names and stops) and contextual information (e.g. distance and time estimated from destination). These two key features, spatial representation and extra information, enable faster cycling speed and less errors on route. Although according to the Human Factors Visual Display Guidelines, the visual representations of the maps have impairments for optimal cycling performance. These are a lack of color contrast such as white text over green backgrounds and an issue with size for the display of information, such as text fonts. Auditory Maps, similarly to Dedicated Light Maps, lack the user tracking feature and additional information, have lower visual disruption (ie. audio feedback), and thus simple forms of directions. Lower mental efforts are correlated with higher effectiveness and lower distractions (Dedicated Light, Moving, and Auditory Maps). Whereas higher mental efforts are correlated with the inverse (Paper Maps).

== Creating New Bicycle Maps ==
There is a great variety of digital-based tools to choose from that allow cyclists to build their own bicycle maps. For simple routes, the Google My Maps app allows users to plan and create new bicycle routes with a simple click of the “Create map” button located in the top right corner of the app. From there, the app provides a variety of straightforward tools, allowing users to name their map, offer descriptions of the route and add up to ten spots and stopping points. The app automatically plots a route for the user, which users can customize to their liking. Once the route is finalized, users can share their custom maps using the “Share” button, and make their map public to the internet using the “ Let Others Search” button. Google My Maps does not include an option for users to mark hazards on route; for more advanced routes users have the option to turn to a variety of other mapping options including Mapzen, which is a great app for complicated bicycle routes, allowing users to style their map in a variety of ways. There are more tools out there including Komoot and Strava. These apps offer technology that can improve existing maps in sectors like safety and clarity, transform handheld maps into digital routes, and share undiscovered routes with cyclists around the world.

== Notable Bicycle Routes And Maps Around The World ==
There are many notable bike routes to explore throughout the world, each with its own map to guide cyclists through safety. Ranging from different climates, locations, and difficulty levels, there is a trail for every type of cyclist. Some of the world's notable routes with easy-to-access maps include the Old Ghost Road located on the South Island of New Zealand, the Minuteman Bikeway located in Massachusetts, USA, The Sea to Sea Route spanning from Ireland to England, and The Karakoram Highway spanning from China to Pakistan. The Old Ghost Road offers a rough and tumble ride through the wilderness of the West Coast region and is world-renowned for its stunning scenery and challenging terrain; this route is for advanced cyclists. The trail's many maps include outlines, landmarks, elevation profiles, and points of interest. The Minuteman Bikeway runs through historic towns in America, following the route that Paul Revere took on his famous ride of 1977 announcing the beginning of the American Revolution. The trail's maps include historic points of interest and nearby attractions on route. The Sea to Sea Route passes through breathtaking landscapes, like the scenic Lake District National Park, providing any level of cyclist with both flat terrain and challenging hills. Maps for this route provide elevation profiles and nearby hazards. The Karakoram Highway offers adventure-seeking cyclists the opportunity to ride on high-altitude terrain and experience steep descents. Maps for this route typically include symbols indicating road conditions, gravel, and landslide warnings. There are hundreds of routes to discover in bicycle touring, some with safe in-depth maps, and others with maps that must be updated.

== Bicycle suitability indices ==
Bicycle suitability indices, also recognized as bicycle level of service (LOS), are instrumental tools utilized by urban planners, transportation engineers, and policymakers to evaluate and refine the quality of bicycle infrastructure within urban contexts. These indices aim to assess various factors influencing the safety, comfort, and convenience of bicyclists along specific roadways or routes. Notable considerations encompass traffic volume and speed, roadway dimensions and lane configuration, intersection design, pavement condition, and the availability of dedicated bicycle facilities such as lanes and parking. Different methodologies, spanning qualitative and quantitative approaches, are employed for assessment, often yielding mapped visualizations delineating routes with differing levels of suitability for bicycling. Integration into broader transportation planning processes ensures alignment with pedestrian, transit, and land use planning endeavors, fostering comprehensive and interconnected transportation networks.

In the later half of the 20th century, urban planners and transportation engineers began to see a need to establishing suitability criteria indices specifically designed for bicyclists. According to research done at the Texas Department of Transportation, two main areas of criteria should be considered when developing maps to show bicycle routes: Stress level criteria are based upon vehicle speed and volume of the curb lane (such as a wide outside lane). Roadway conditions, also called BLOS or Bicycle Level of Service, consider variables dealing with speed limit, pavement condition, and location factors.

== Safety ==
Both paper and web-based bicycle maps are used to promote cycling safety. Cities label themselves as cycle friendly when they integrate bike lanes into their maps. This allows for major roads to be avoided which decreases the potential for accidents with cars. Additionally, bike maps denote major road crossings and promote the development of larger cycling networks when disparities are analyzed. Research on how bicycle maps improve bicycle safety involves testing route information and how participants prefer to receive directions. Both complex and non-complex bike maps allowed cyclists to travel efficiently, and complex maps including service stations gave cyclists more relevant information. Safe routing information is important as uninformed cycling becomes more common alongside the increase in bicycle usage.

== See also ==
- Street map
- Bike lane
- bike path
- Safety bicycle
- Bike boom
- Street map
- Railway
- Hills
- organized campaign to improve pavements
- League of American Wheelmen
- Motorcar
- City
- Advocacy group
- Wayfinding
- Route planning
- Web map service
- Google Maps
- Open Street Map
- Bing Maps
- Apple Maps
- Open Source Routing Machine
- Mapzen
- Komoot
- Strava
- Old Ghost Road
- Minuteman Bikeway
- Karakoram Highway
- Paul Revere
- Lake District National Park
- Texas Department of Transportation
- Wide outside lane
- Level of Service
- Bicycle safety
