= Transit map =

Map used to illustrate the routes of public transport

The New York City Subway map as of May 2018 (freely licensed schematic). The map includes other public transportation systems in addition to the subways.

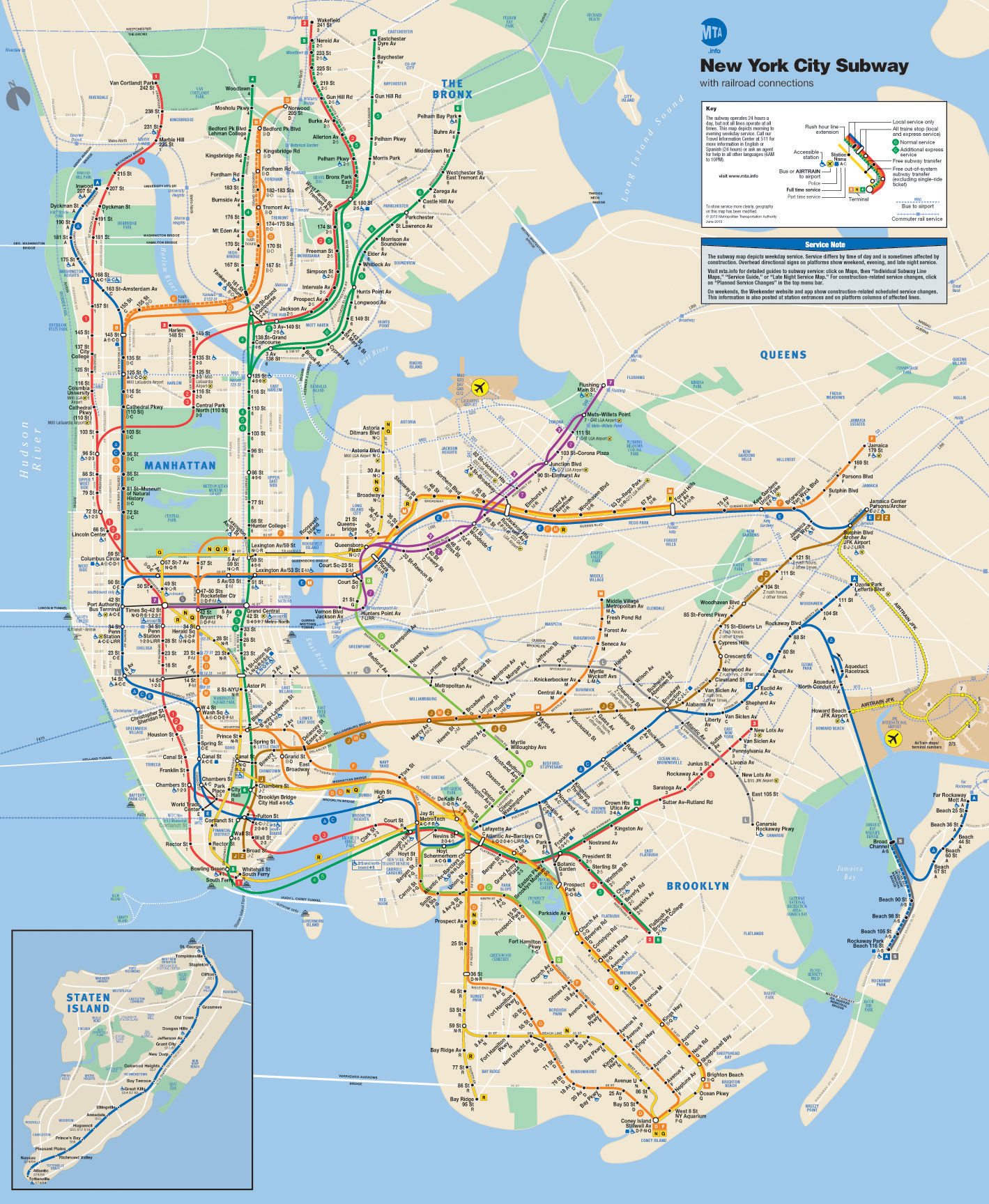
The New York City Subway map as of June 2013. (Note: The current subway maps can be found at https://www.mta.info/maps.)

A transit map is a topological map in the form of a schematic diagram used to illustrate the routes and stations within a public transport system—whether this be bus, tram, rapid transit, commuter rail or ferry routes. Metro maps, subway maps, or tube maps of metropolitan railways are some common examples.

The primary function of a transit map is facilitating the passengers' orientation and navigation, helping them to efficiently use the public transport system and identify which stations function as interchange between lines.

Transit maps can usually be found in the transit vehicles, at the platforms or in printed timetables. They are also accessible through digital platforms like mobile apps and websites, ensuring widespread availability and convenience for passengers.

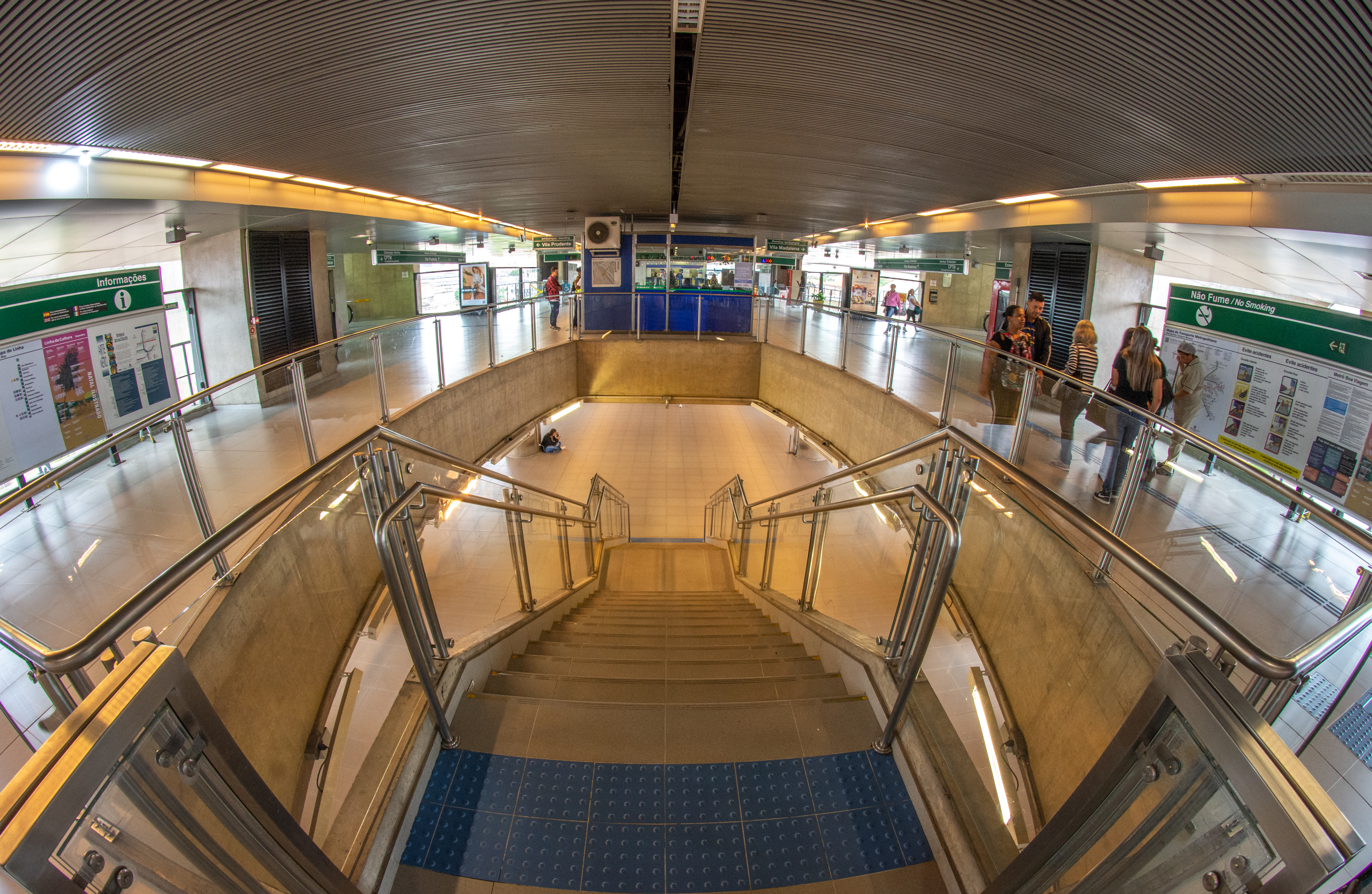
São Paulo Metro, Tamanduatei Station. Maps of the system can be seen at the sides (Mapa do Transporte Metropolitano).

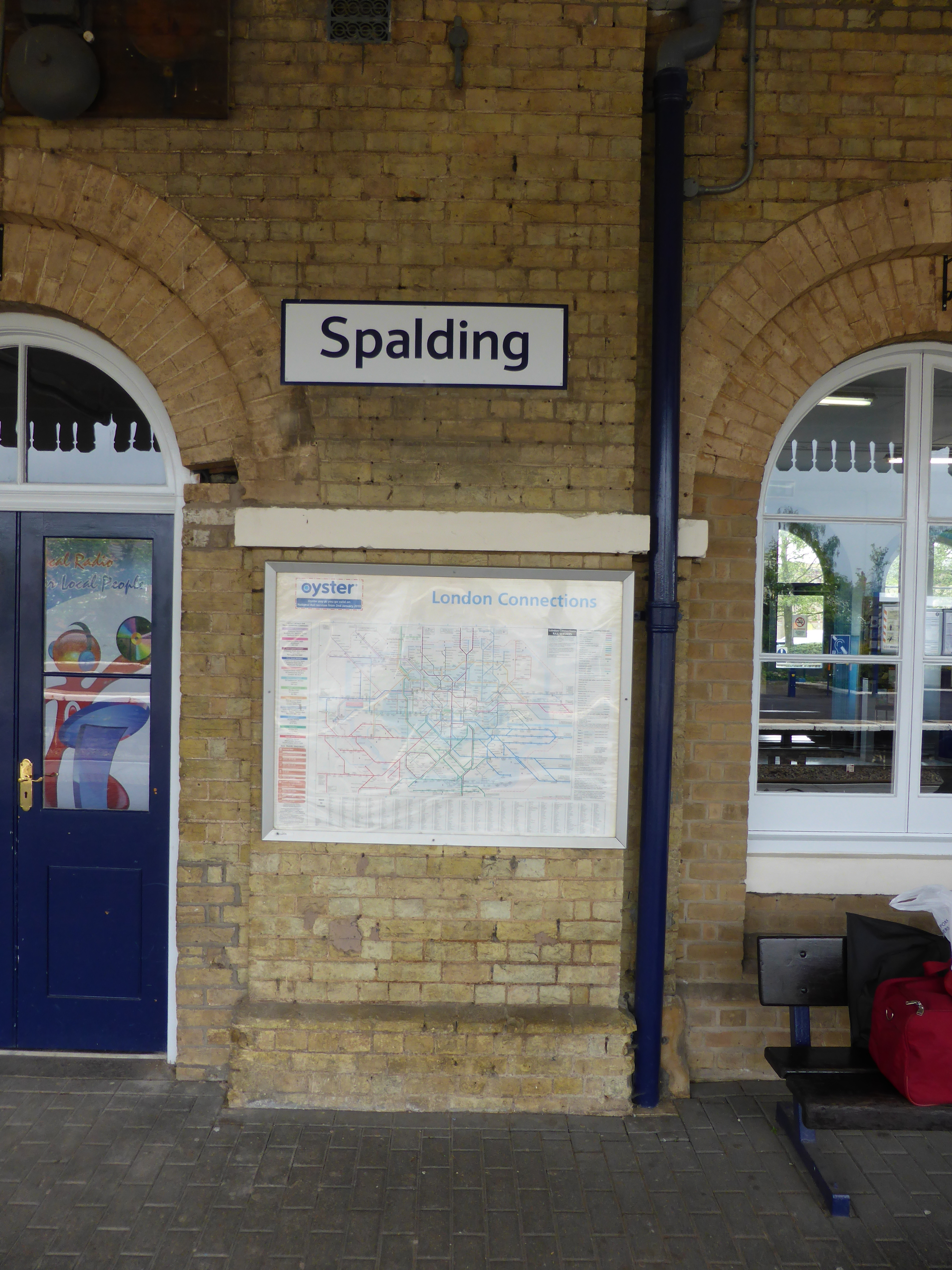
Tube map at Spalding railway station, Lincolnshire.

== History ==
The mapping of transit systems was at first generally geographically accurate, but abstract route-maps of individual lines (usually displayed inside the carriages) can be traced back as early as 1908 (London's District line), and certainly there are examples from European and American railroad cartography as early as the 1890s where geographical features have been removed and the routes of lines have been artificially straightened out. But it was George Dow of the London and North Eastern Railway who was the first to launch a diagrammatic representation of an entire rail transport network (in 1929); his work is seen by historians of the subject as being part of the inspiration for Harry Beck when he launched his iconic London Underground map in 1933.

After this pioneering work, many transit authorities worldwide imitated the diagrammatic look for their own networks, some while continuing to also publish hybrid versions that were geographically accurate.

Early maps of the Berlin U-Bahn, Berlin S-Bahn, Boston T, Paris Métro, and New York City Subway also exhibited some elements of the diagrammatic form.

The 2007 edition of the Madrid Metro map, designed by the RaRo Agency, took the idea of a simple diagram one step further by becoming one of the first produced for a major network to remove diagonal lines altogether; it is constituted just by horizontal and vertical lines at right angles to each other. After many complaints over its disadvantages, the company reverted to the previous map in 2013.

Transit maps are now increasingly digitized and can be shown in many forms online.

== Elements ==
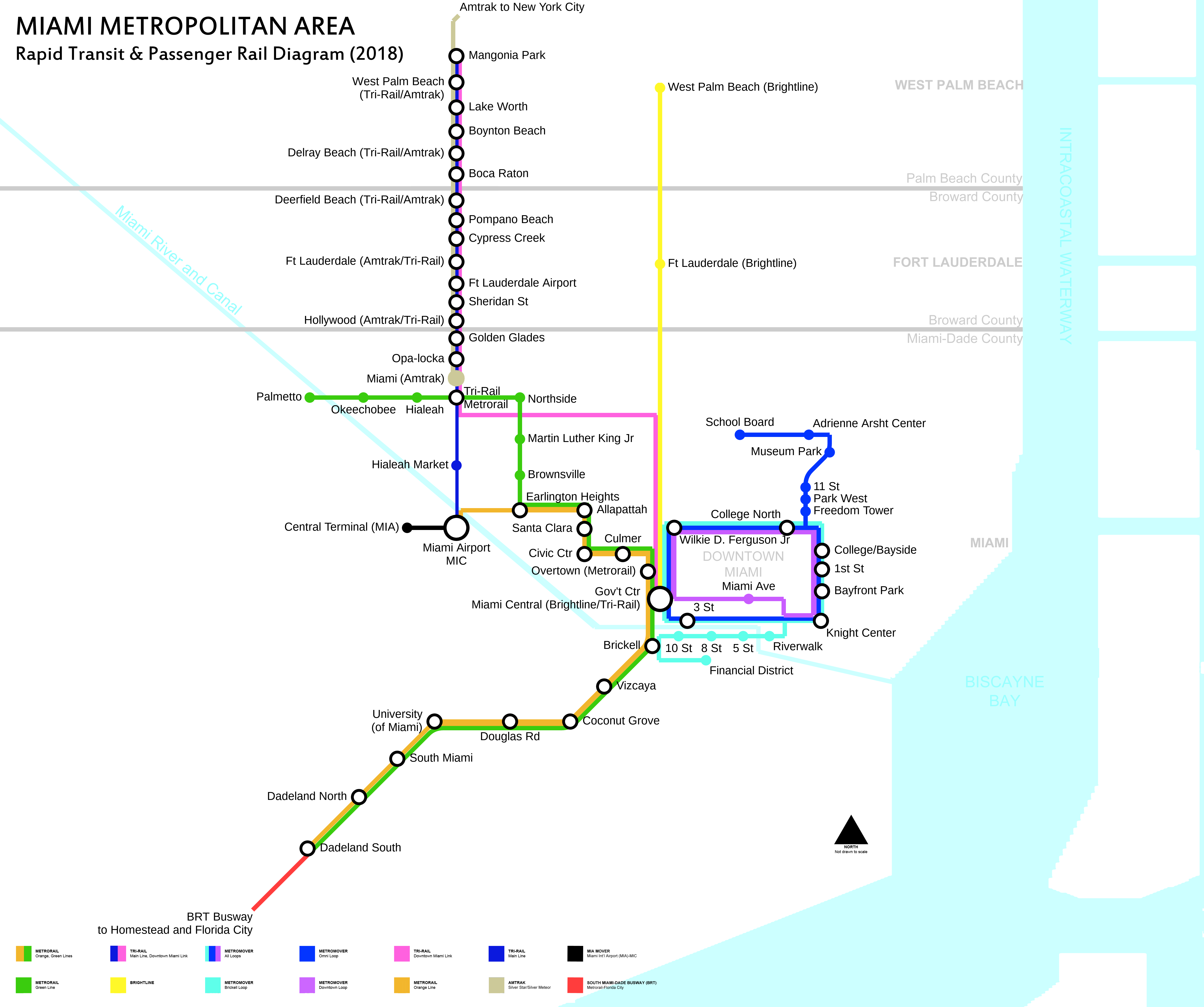
Schematic transit map of Miami/South Florida regional rail transit, where there are several types of systems from intercity and commuter rail down to automated people movers and a small heavy rail system with a bus rapid transit feeder. It is not to scale, the area covered is about 100 miles (160 km) north-south by 10 miles (16 km) wide.

Transit maps use symbols and abstract representation of the location's geography to illustrate the lines, stations and transfer points of the system while still serving as a tool of physical navigation in the city.

Stations are marked with symbols that break the line's continuity, along with their names, so they may be referred to on other maps or travel itineraries. Further help may be granted through the inclusion of important tourist attractions and other locations such as the city center; these may be identified through symbols or wording.

Color coding allows the map to specify each route in an easy way, allowing the users to quickly identify where each specific route goes; if it does not go to the desired destination, the colors and symbols allow the user to identify a feasible point of transfer between lines.

Symbols such as aircraft may be used to illustrate airports, and symbols of trains may be used to identify stations that allow transfer to other modes, such as commuter or intercity train services.

== Use by transit systems ==
Many transit authorities publish multiple maps of their systems; this can be done by isolating one mode of transport, for instance only rapid transit or only bus, onto a single map, or instead the authorities publish maps covering only a limited area, but with greater detail. Another modification is to produce geographically accurate maps of the system, to allow users to better understand the routes. Even if official geographically accurate maps are not available, these can often be obtained from unofficial sources since the information is available from other sources.

With the widespread use of zone pricing for fare calculation, systems that span more than one zone need a system to inform the use which zone a particular station is located in. Common ways include varying the tone of the background color, or by running a weak line along the zone boundaries.

== Use outside of transit ==
There are a growing number of books, websites and works of art on the subject of urban rail and metro map design and use. There are now hundreds of examples of diagrams in an urban rail or metro map style that are used to represent everything from other transit networks like buses and national rail services to sewerage systems and Derbyshire public houses.

One of the most well-known adaptations of an urban rail map was The Great Bear, a lithograph by Simon Patterson. First shown in 1992 and nominated for the Turner Prize, The Great Bear replaces station names on the London Underground map with those of explorers, saints, film stars, philosophers and comedians. Other artists such as Scott Rosenbaum, and Ralph Gray have also taken the iconic style of the urban rail map and made new artistic creations ranging from the abstract to the Solar System. Following the success of these the idea of adapting other urban rail and metro maps has spread so that now almost every major subway or rapid transit system with a map has been doctored with different names, often anagrams of the original station name.

Some maps including those for the rapid transit systems of New York City, Washington D.C., Boston, Montreal, Denver, London have been recreated to include the names of local pubs.

== See also ==
- Bicycle map
- Isochrone map
- Metrominuto
- Road map
- Walkability § Mapping walkability
