= Triste =

Triste (Spanish for Sad) may refer to:

- Triste, a small settlement in Las Peñas de Riglos, Hoya de Huesca
- Triste (film), a 1996 short film by Nathaniel Dorsky
- El Triste (album), a 1970 album by José José
  - "El Triste", a song by José José
- El Triste (Zacarías Ferreíra album), 2000
- "Triste" (Antônio Carlos Jobim song), a Brazilian song by Antônio Carlos Jobim
- Buly Da Conceição Triste (born 1991), São Tomé and Príncipe canoeist

== See also ==
- Trieste (disambiguation)
