= Trieste (disambiguation) =

Trieste is a city in Italy.

Trieste may also refer to:

== Places ==
- Trieste (Rome), a district of Rome
- Free Territory of Trieste, a free state that existed between 1945 and 1954 (formally until 1977)
- Imperial Free City of Trieste, a Habsburg possession from the 14th century to 1918
- Province of Trieste, a province in the Friuli-Venezia Giulia Region of Italy

== Military ==
- Trieste (bathyscaphe), a 1953 deep-sea submersible
  - Trieste II (Bathyscaphe)
- 101st Motorized Division "Trieste", an infantry division of Italy during World War II
- Italian cruiser Trieste, a WWII Italian heavy cruiser
- Italian landing helicopter dock Trieste, a multipurpose amphibious unit for the Italian Navy

== Other ==
- Trieste (film), a 1951 Yugoslav drama film
- "Trieste" (song), a 2020 song by Lucio Corsi
- Leopoldo Trieste (1917–2003), Italian actor, film director and screenwriter

== See also ==
- Istria (disambiguation)
- Triste (disambiguation)
