= Metrominuto =

Schematic pedestrian map created in Pontevedra, Spain

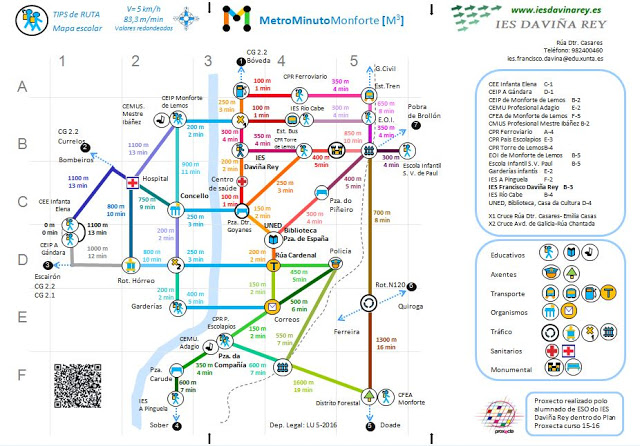
Metrominuto from Monforte de Lemos.

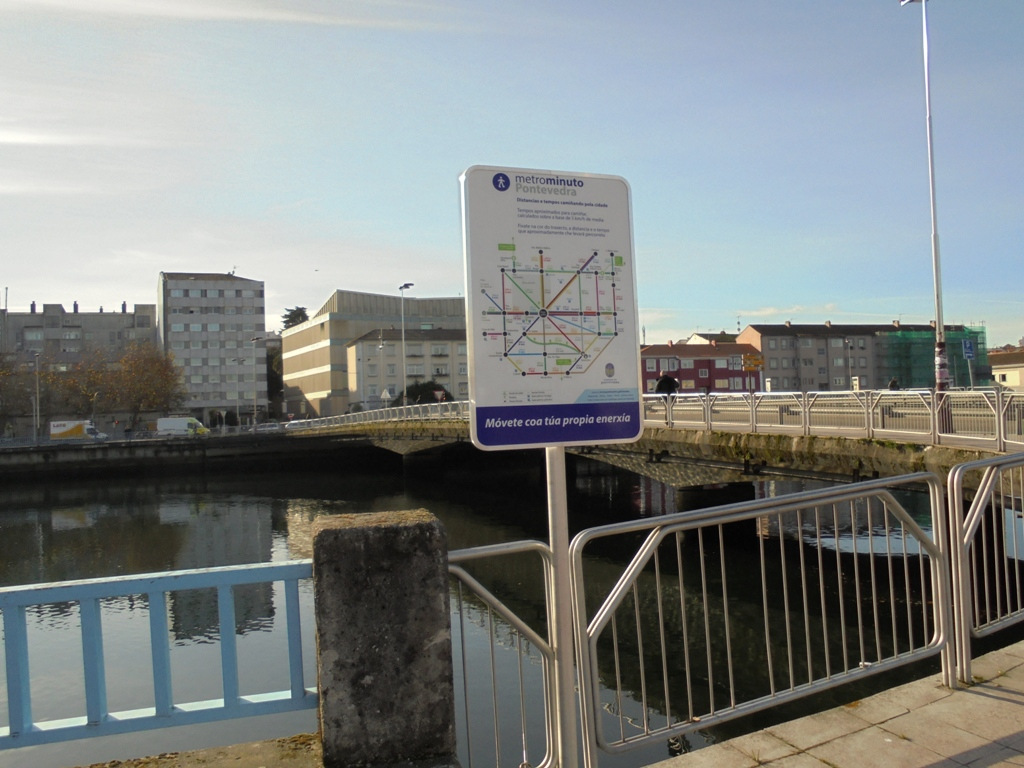
Metrominuto information sign in Pontevedra.

Metrominuto is a schematic pedestrian map based on the aesthetics of transit maps, marking the distances between the most important points of a city and the times an average person would take to walk those distances, designed to encourage citizens to get around on foot.

Metrominuto was created in 2011 in Pontevedra, Spain by the local government, demystifying the time taken to get on foot from one point of the city to another in a simple and easy reading way, within the framework of an overall strategy to promote urban walkability. Since its creation, they have distributed Metrominuto as a paper hand map, put up on public transport information panels, installed as an information sign all around the city, developed as a free mobile app and promoted using slogans such as “Move with your own energy” or “You live better on foot”. Metrominuto along with the urban transformation of Pontevedra into a pedestrian friendly and universally accessible city has won many national and international awards such as the European INTERMODES Urban Mobility Award in 2013 and the 2014 Dubai International Best Practices Award for Sustainable Development awarded by UN-Habitat in partnership with Dubai Municipality.

Metrominuto has been introduced, in their own customized layout, in many European cities such as Toulouse in France, Florence, Ferrara, Modena and Cagliari in Italy, Poznań in Poland, Belgorod in Russia, Angel in the United Kingdom and Zaragoza, Seville, Cádiz, Salamanca, Granada, Jerez de la Frontera, A Coruña and Pamplona in Spain.
