= GraphHopper =

Open source routing engine

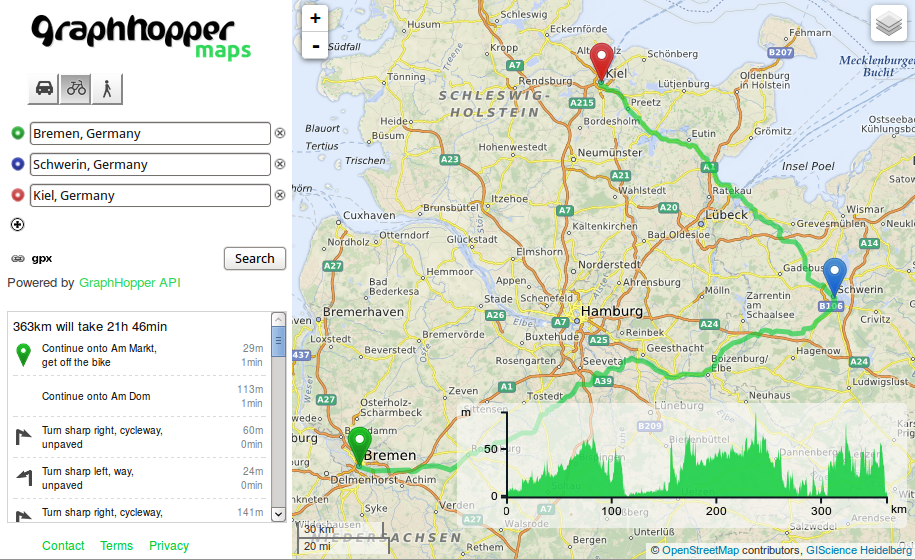
- Developer: GraphHopper community
- Stable release: 11.0 / 14 October 2025; 2 months ago
- Repository: github.com/graphhopper/graphhopper
- Written in: Java
- Operating system: Cross-platform
- Type: Search, Graph and GPS navigation software
- License: Apache License 2.0
- Website: graphhopper.com

GraphHopper is an open-source routing library and server written in Java and provides a routing API over HTTP. It runs on the server, desktop, Android, iOS or Raspberry Pi. By default OpenStreetMap data for the road network and elevation data from the Shuttle Radar Topography Mission is used. The front-end is open-source too and called GraphHopper Maps.

GraphHopper can be configured to use different algorithms such as Dijkstra, A* and its bidirectional versions. To make routing fast enough for long paths (continental size) and avoid heuristical approaches GraphHopper uses contraction hierarchies by default. In the Java Magazine from Oracle, the author, Peter Karich, describes the techniques necessary to make the system memory efficient and fast. Furthermore, GraphHopper is built on a large test suite including unit, integration and load tests.

The Apache License allows everyone to customize and integrate GraphHopper in free or commercial products, and together with the query speed and OpenStreetMap data this makes GraphHopper a possible alternative to existing routing services and GPS navigation software e.g. using the Maplibre Navigation SDK.

Besides point-to-point routing for different vehicles GraphHopper can be used to calculate distance matrices which are then used as an input for vehicle routing problems. Other use cases are:

- Track vehicles via map matching - i.e. 'snap' real world GPS points to digital road network
- Assist urban planning
- Traffic simulation
- Isochrone calculation - i.e. determining the reachability for cars, pedestrians or bikes
- Indoor routing like for warehouse optimizations or tradeshow planning
- Eco-efficient routing
- Virtual reality games like Scotland Yard

== Users ==
Notable users of GraphHopper are Rome2rio, Deutsche Bahn, Komoot, Gnome and Flixbus. Since February 2015, GraphHopper has been one of the APIs powering routing on the official OpenStreetMap website and version 0.4 was released shortly afterwards in March 2015.

== Company ==
In January 2016, the developers of GraphHopper and jsprit formed the company GraphHopper GmbH.

=== GraphHopper Directions API ===
The GraphHopper Directions API is an offering of the GraphHopper GmbH and includes a Geocoding API, a Distance Matrix API, a Map Matching API, an Isochrone API, a Cluster API, a Profiles API and a Route Optimization API besides the Routing API

== See also ==
- Open Source Routing Machine
