= Istria (Milan Metro) =

Milan metro station

Coordinates: 45.5017°N 9.1978°E

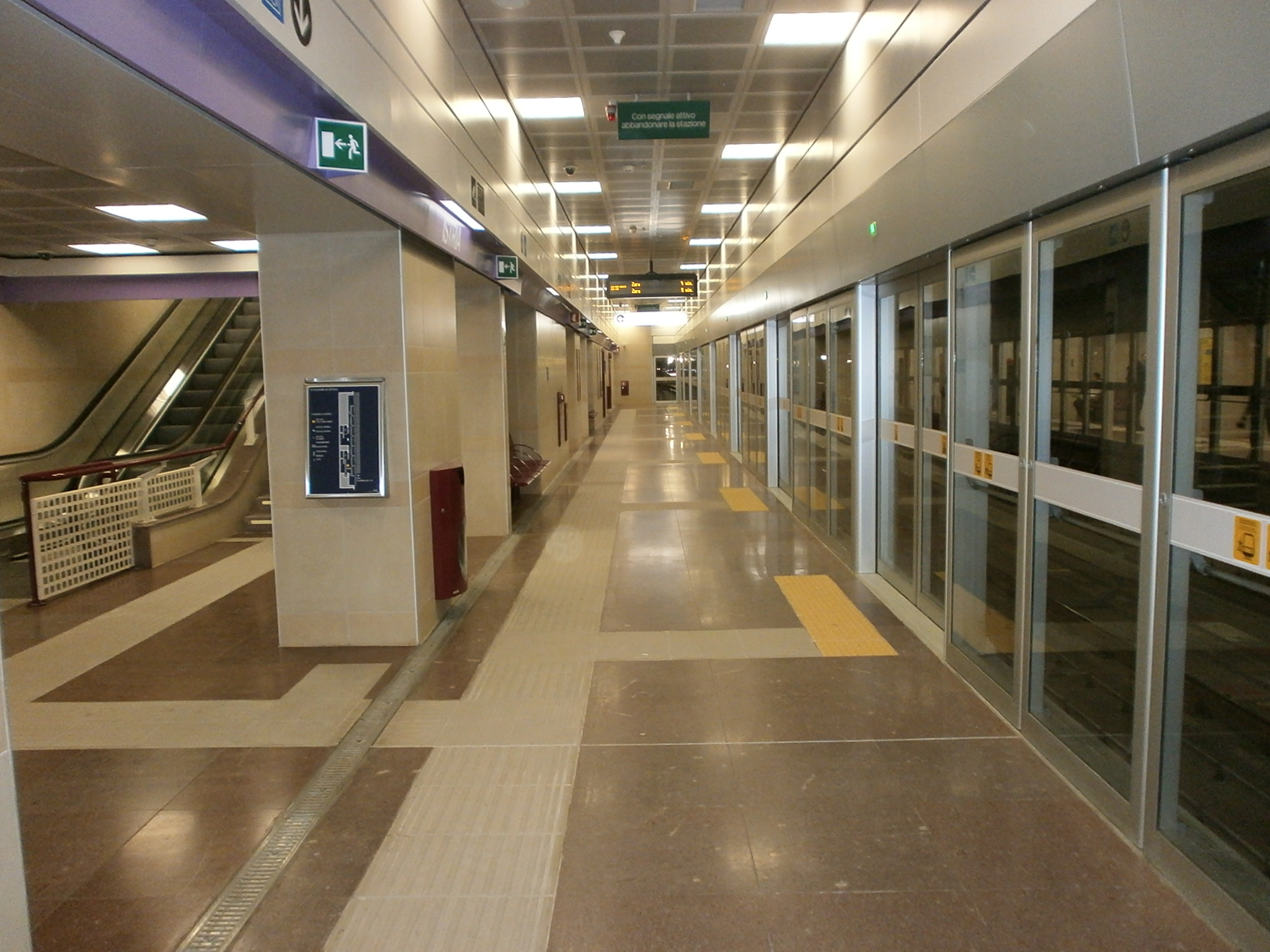

General information
- Owner: Azienda Trasporti Milanesi
- Platforms: 2
- Tracks: 2

Construction
- Structure type: Underground
- Accessible: yes

Other information
- Fare zone: STIBM: Mi1

History
- Opened: 10 February 2013; 13 years ago

Services
Preceding station	Milan Metro	Following station
Ca’ Granda towards Bignami	Line 5	Marche towards San Siro Stadio
Location

Istria is a station on Line 5 of the Milan Metro.

== History ==
The works for the construction of the first section of Line 5, which includes Istria station, began in September 2007, and it was opened on 10 February 2013.

== Station structure ==
Istria is an underground station with two tracks in one tunnel and, like all the other stations on Line 5, is wheelchair accessible.

It is located under Piazzale Istria.

== Interchanges ==
Tram lines 5, 7 and 31 bus stops are located near the station.
