= Gousha =

Defunct American map company

H.M. Gousha Company
- Parent company: Times Mirror Company (1961–1987); Simon & Schuster (1987–1996)
- Status: Defunct
- Founded: 1926
- Founder: Harry Mathias Gousha
- Successor: Rand McNally
- Country of origin: United States
- Headquarters location: Comfort, Texas
- Publication types: road maps, atlases, books

The H.M. Gousha Company was one of the "Big Three" major producers of road maps and atlases in the United States during the 25 years following World War II, making maps for free distribution by oil companies and auto clubs. Following the end of the free-road-map era, Gousha distributed maps through retailers, and published a number of travel guides and other travel-related books.

Brands under the Gousha imprint from the 1970s onward included Chek-Chart and Fastmap, one of the first lines of laminate-encapsulated maps.

== History ==
Harry Mathias Gousha, a sales executive for Rand McNally, left that company in 1926 to start his own map company out of Chicago, quickly becoming Rand McNally's chief competitor by offering the Touraide: a spiral-bound book with road maps, points of interest, and accommodations that was custom-assembled for individual buyers.

In 1947, the company moved its headquarters to 2001 The Alameda in San Jose, California. H.M. Gousha Map Company was acquired by the Times Mirror Company in 1961, and then Simon & Schuster in 1987. In Gousha's later years, the company operated out of Comfort, Texas. Analog maps (large plate, hand etched negatives) and digital maps were produced out of this office. Predominantly, road maps were being produced with a catalog containing the major cities throughout the United States. Hundreds, if not thousands, of sources were studied to continually improve and update the cartographic library for veracity of information and viability of sales. Maps could be found in major bookstores, gas stations, and under other companies' imprints. Finally, the company was purchased by Rand McNally in 1996; by then, Viacom had become the parent of Simon & Schuster. Its production facility in Texas was closed and virtually all workers laid off. The Gousha artwork became part of the Rand McNally archive, and much of the company's archives were turned over to the Newberry Library.
