= GTFS =

Data standard for public transport information

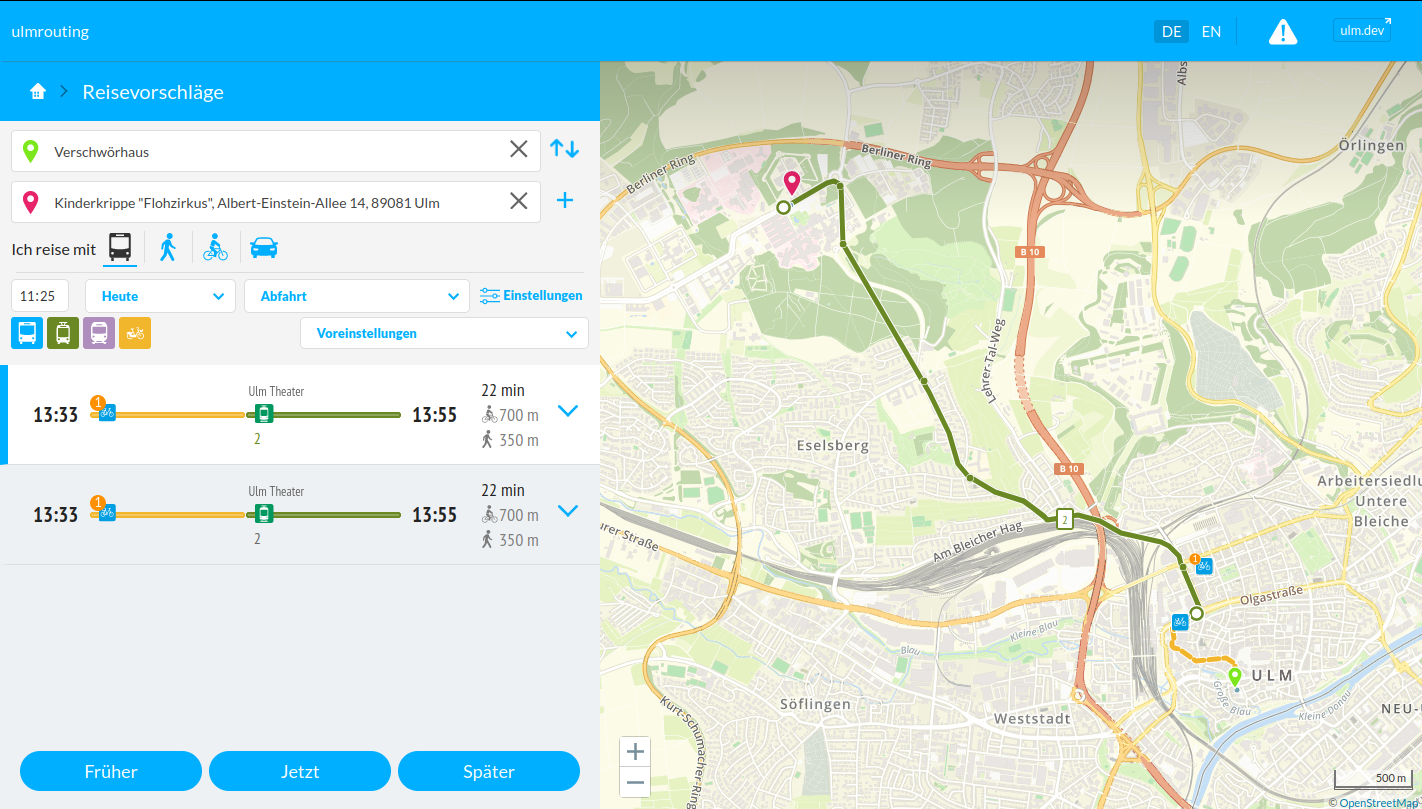
- A visualization created from GTFS data for transit routes in Ulm, Germany
- Filename extension: .zip
- Developed by: Google
- Initial release: 27 September 2006 (20 years ago)
- Type of format: Transit schedule format
- Extended from: CSV
- Standard: De facto standard
- Open format?: Yes, CC BY 3.0
- Website: gtfs.org

GTFS, or the General Transit Feed Specification, is a general transit feed specification which defines a common data format for public transportation schedules and associated geographic information. GTFS contains only static or scheduled information about public transport services, and is sometimes known as GTFS Static or GTFS Schedule to distinguish it from the GTFS Realtime extension, which defines how information on the realtime status of services can be shared.

== History ==
What was to become GTFS started out as a side project of Google employee Chris Harrelson in 2005, who "monkeyed around with ways to incorporate transit data into Google Maps when he heard from Tim and Bibiana McHugh, married IT managers at TriMet, the transit agency for Portland, Oregon". McHugh is cited with being frustrated about finding transit directions in unfamiliar cities, while popular mapping services were already offering easy-to-use driving directions at the time.

Bibiana and Tim McHugh eventually got into contact with Google and provided the company with CSV exports of TriMet's schedule data. In December 2005, Portland became the first city to be featured in the first version of Google's "Transit Trip Planner". In September 2006, five more US cities were added to the Google Transit Trip Planner, and the data format released as the Google Transit Feed Specification.

In the United States, there had not been any standard for public transit timetables prior to the advent of GTFS, not even a de facto standard. According to long-time BART website manager Timothy Moore, before the advent of GTFS, BART had to provide different data consumers with different formats, making a standardized transit format very desirable. The publicly and freely available format specification, as well as the availability of GTFS schedules, quickly made developers base their transit-related software on the format. This resulted in "hundreds of useful and popular transit applications" as well as catalogues listing available GTFS feeds. Due to the common data format those applications adhere to, solutions do not need to be custom-tailored to one transit operator, but can easily be extended to any region where a GTFS feed is available.

Due to the wide use of the format, the "Google" part of the original name was seen as a misnomer "that makes some potential users shy away from adopting GTFS". As a consequence, it was proposed to change the name of the specification to General Transit Feed Specification in 2009.

== Applications ==
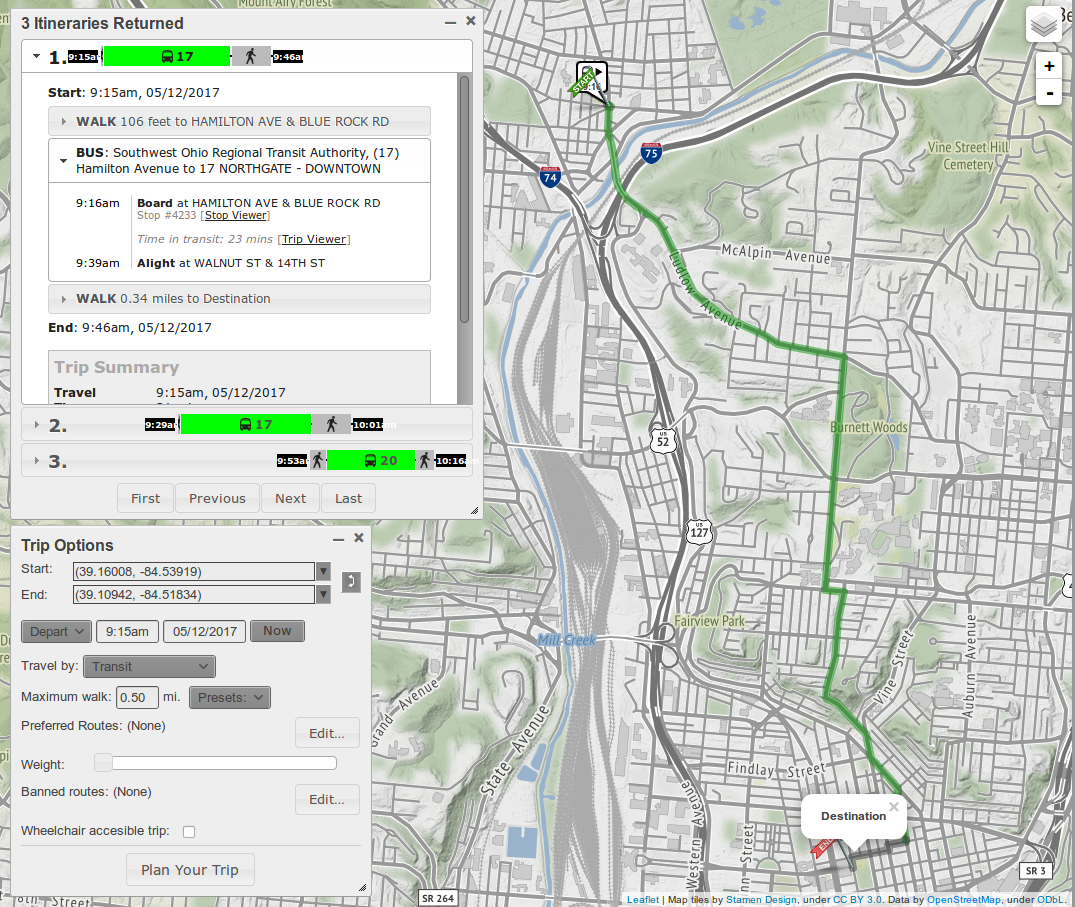
Screenshot showing OpenTripPlanner with route from GTFS data highlighted.

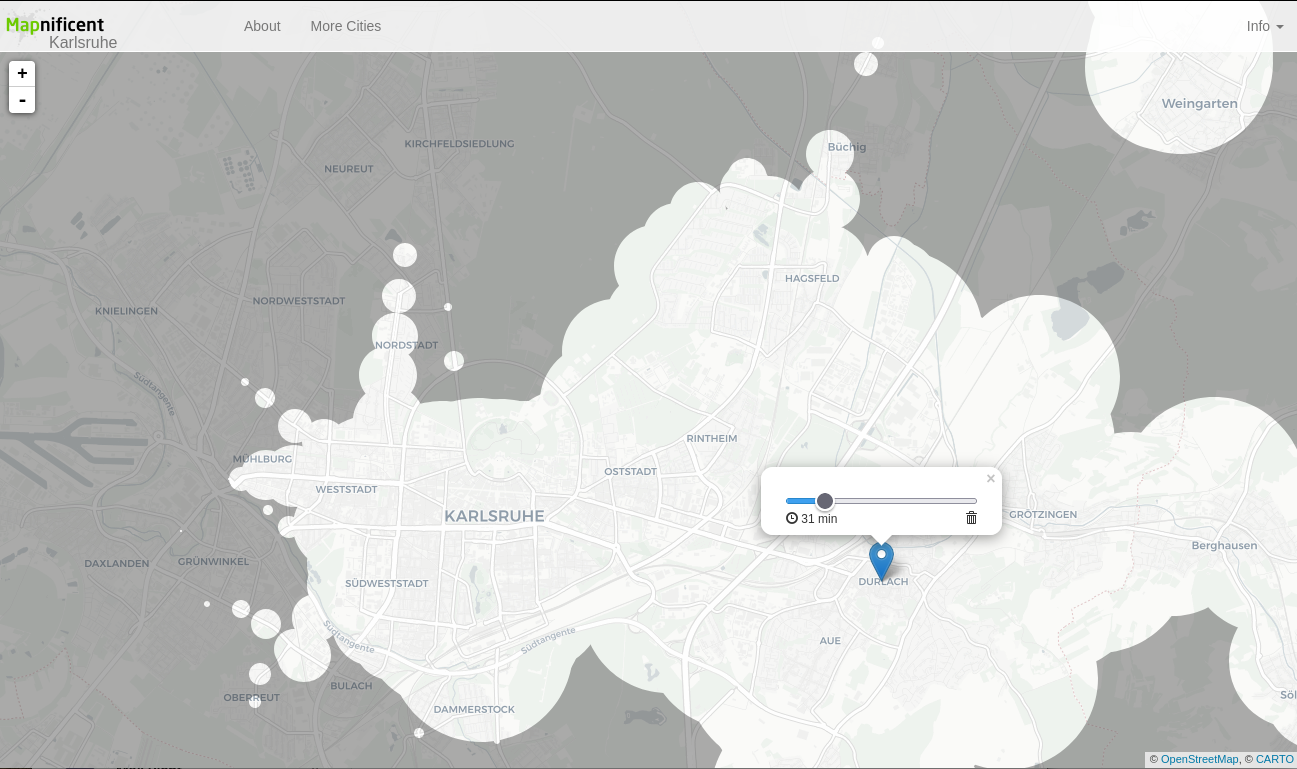
GTFS-based reachability analysis via Mapnificent

=== Journey planning ===
GTFS is typically used to supply data on public transit for use in multi-modal journey planner applications. In most cases, GTFS is combined with a detailed representation of the street/pedestrian network to allow routing to take place from point to point rather than just between stops. This data is often extended using GTFS-Realtime to factor delays, cancellations, and modified trips into realtime journey planning queries. OpenTripPlanner is open-source software that can do journey planning with a combination of GTFS and OpenStreetMap data. Other general purpose applications exist such as the ArcMap Network Analyst extension which can incorporate GTFS for transit routing.

GTFS was originally designed for use in Google Transit, an online multi-modal journey planning application.

=== Accessibility research ===
GTFS is often used in research on transit accessibility where it is typically used to estimate travel times by transit from one point to many other points at different times of day. Studies however have called such applications into question due to their reliance on schedules alone without accounting for reliability issues and regular schedule non-adherence.

=== Comparing service levels ===
GTFS has been used to measure changes in accessibility due to changes in transit service provision, either actual or proposed. Analysis of changes in service over time can be accomplished by simply comparing published GTFS data for the same agency from different time periods. For comparison of existing service with proposed infrastructure or service changes, a future GTFS must often be constructed by hand based on proposed service characteristics.

=== Feed registries ===
Public GTFS feeds have been aggregated in a variety of feed registries:

- Mobility Database (2023 - present) builds on TransitFeeds (2013-2024) which maintained a directory of GTFS and GTFS Realtime feeds and an interactive website for browsing feed contents.
- Transitland (2014 - present) maintains a directory of GTFS and GTFS Realtime feeds in 55+ countries and provides both an interactive website and APIs for querying feed contents. Transitland was originally created by Mapzen and is now maintained by Interline Technologies.
- GTFS Data Exchange (2008–2016) allowed public transit agencies of all sizes to upload copies of their GTFS feeds. The website is no longer active.

== Structure ==
Class diagram of GTFS

A GTFS feed is a collection of at least six and up to 20 or more CSV files (with extension .txt) contained within a .zip file. Preferred character encoding is UTF-8. Together, the related CSV tables describe a transit system's scheduled operations as visible to riders. The specification is designed to be sufficient to provide trip planning functionality, but is also useful for other applications such as analysis of service levels and some general performance measures. In contrast to European transit industry exchange standards such as Transmodel or VDV-45X, GTFS only includes scheduled operations that are meant to be distributed to riders. It is also limited to scheduled information and does not include real-time information. However, real-time information can be related to GTFS schedules according to the related GTFS Realtime specification.

Following are descriptions of the tables required for a valid GTFS data feed. Each table is literally a text CSV file whose filename is the name of the table, suffixed by '.txt'. So for the 'agency' table below, a CSV file called 'agency.txt' would be included in a valid GTFS feed.

=== Mandatory tables ===
==== agency ====
The agency table provides information about the transit agency as such, including name, website and contact information.

Required fields:

- agency_name
- agency_url
- agency_timezone

==== routes ====
The routes table identifies distinct routes. This is to be distinguished from distinct routings (or paths), several of which may belong to a single route.

Required fields:

- route_id (primary key)
- route_short_name
- route_long_name
- route_type
- background_color
- foreground_color

==== trips ====
Required fields:

- trip_id (primary key)
- route_id (foreign key)
- service_id (foreign key)

Optional fields:

- block_id - The block ID indicates the schedule block to which a trip belongs.

==== stop_times ====
Required fields:

- stop_id (primary key)
- trip_id (foreign key)
- arrival_time
- departure_time
- stop_sequence

Note that dwell time may be modeled by the difference between the arrival and departure times. However, many agencies do not seem to model dwell time for most stops.

==== stops ====
The stops table defines the geographic locations of each and every actual stop or station in the transit system as well as, and optionally, some of the amenities associated with those stops.

Required fields:

- stop_id (primary key)
- stop_name
- stop_lon
- stop_lat

==== calendar ====
The calendar table defines service patterns that operate recurrently such as, for example, every weekday. Service patterns that don't repeat such as for a one-time special event will be defined in the calendar_dates table.

Required fields:

- service_id (primary key)
- Monday
- Tuesday
- Wednesday
- Thursday
- Friday
- Saturday
- Sunday
- start_date
- end_date

=== Optional tables ===
==== calendar_dates ====
Calendar dates is an optional table which adds exceptions to the calendar.txt file. This can be adding additional days or removing days, such as for holiday service. The file only contains three columns, the service id, date, and exception type (either added or removed). A service id does not have to be inside the calendar.txt file to be added to this table.

==== fare_attributes ====
Fare information for a transit agency's routes. Part of the Fares v1 format.

==== fare_rules ====
Rules to apply fares for itineraries. Part of the Fares v1 format.

Most fare structures use some combination of the following rules:

- Fare depends on origin or destination stations.
- Fare depends on which zones the itinerary passes through.
- Fare depends on which route the itinerary uses.

==== shapes ====
Rules for drawing lines on a map to represent a transit organization's routes.

==== frequencies ====
This table specifies headway (time between trips) for routes with variable frequency of service.

==== transfers ====
Rules for making connections at transfer points between routes.

==== feed_info ====
An optional feed start date and optional feed expiration date can be set. Agencies may publish feeds that are several days into the future. Thus, journey planning software applications keep multiple feed versions and the correct feed for a particular day or time.

==== rider_categories ====
Optional file to define rider categories that correspond to fare classes. One can be specified as the default (typically Adult full fare). URLs with additional information can be provided. Part of the Fares v2 format.

==== fare_media ====
This table is used to specify available methods for paying and validating the fare. Part of the Fares v2 format.

==== fare_products ====
This table is used to specify the price of various fares. It is part of the Fares v2 format and supports fares that vary based on route, distance, zones, rider category, payment method, and transfers used.

==== pathways ====
This table is used as part of GTFS Pathways to supply internal station navigation information. Pathways connect the nodes defined in stops.txt to specify how to travel from station entrances to boarding platforms.

==== levels ====
A tables used as part of GTFS Pathways to define station levels for reference by nodes in stops.txt. A positive index indicates a level above the ground, 0 is ground level, and negative means below ground.

translations

The translations table consists of these columns: table_name, field_name, field_value, record_id, record_sub_id, language, translation. Translations are broken down into their respective tables, and any text field or URL may be translated. Translations in GTFS use two types of keys in the key-value table. Record_id uses an ID for the field like stop_id or trip_id, while field_value is a matching value to the field_name's original contents. Tables using a two-value tuple, such as stop_times, use record_id and record_sub_id to represent the tuple. The translation column is the output.

== See also ==
- Bing Maps
- Google Transit
- Journey planner
- Open standard
