= Mapzen =

Open-source mapping platform

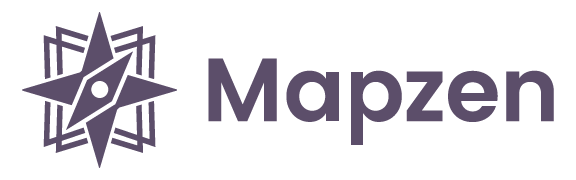

Mapzen, founded in 2013 and headquartered in New York City, was an open source mapping platform company focused on the core components of geo platforms, including search (geocoding), rendering (vector tiles), navigation/routing, and data. Mapzen's components are used by OpenStreetMap, CartoDB, and Remix, amongst others. The components, hosted on GitHub, are written in JavaScript, Ruby, Java, and Python. Mapzen's CEO, Randy Meech, was previously SVP of engineering for MapQuest. Mapzen was supported by Samsung Research America and was known to have hired mapping specialists from Apple.

Mapzen shut down operations in late January, 2018.

On the 28th of January 2019 The Linux Foundation announced Mapzen would become a Linux Foundation Project.

== Projects ==
Mapzen's hosted products were powered by open-source components, including:

- Pelias - a geocoder/search engine;
- Tangram - a set of cross-platform 3D map rendering libraries;
- Tilezen - vector map tiles based on OpenStreetMap data;
- Valhalla - a multi-modal routing engine;
- Transitland - an open transit data platform that aggregates GTFS feeds;
- Who's on First - a gazetteer.
