= Istria (river) =

- Location within Romania

Location
- Country: Romania
- Counties: Constanța County
- Villages: Istria

Physical characteristics
- Mouth: Lake Istria
  - coordinates: 44.5616°N 28.7379°E
- Length: 10 km (6.2 mi)
- Basin size: 42 km^{2} (16 sq mi)

Basin features
- Progression: Lake Istria→ Lake Sinoe→ Black Sea
- River code: XV.1.6a

The Istria is a river in Constanța County, Romania. Near the village Istria it flows into Lake Istria, which is connected with Lake Sinoe, a lagoon of the Black Sea. Its length is 10 km (6.2 mi) and its basin size is 42 km^{2} (16 sq mi).
