= Histria =

Histria may refer to:

- Histria (ancient land), the "land of the Histri", the ancient name of the Istrian Peninsula
  - Venetia et Histria, a region (regio) of Roman Italy
- Histria (ancient city), a Greek colony on the western shore of the Black Sea
  - Battle of Histria (c. 62-61 BC)
