= Istria, Constanța =

Istria
- Commune
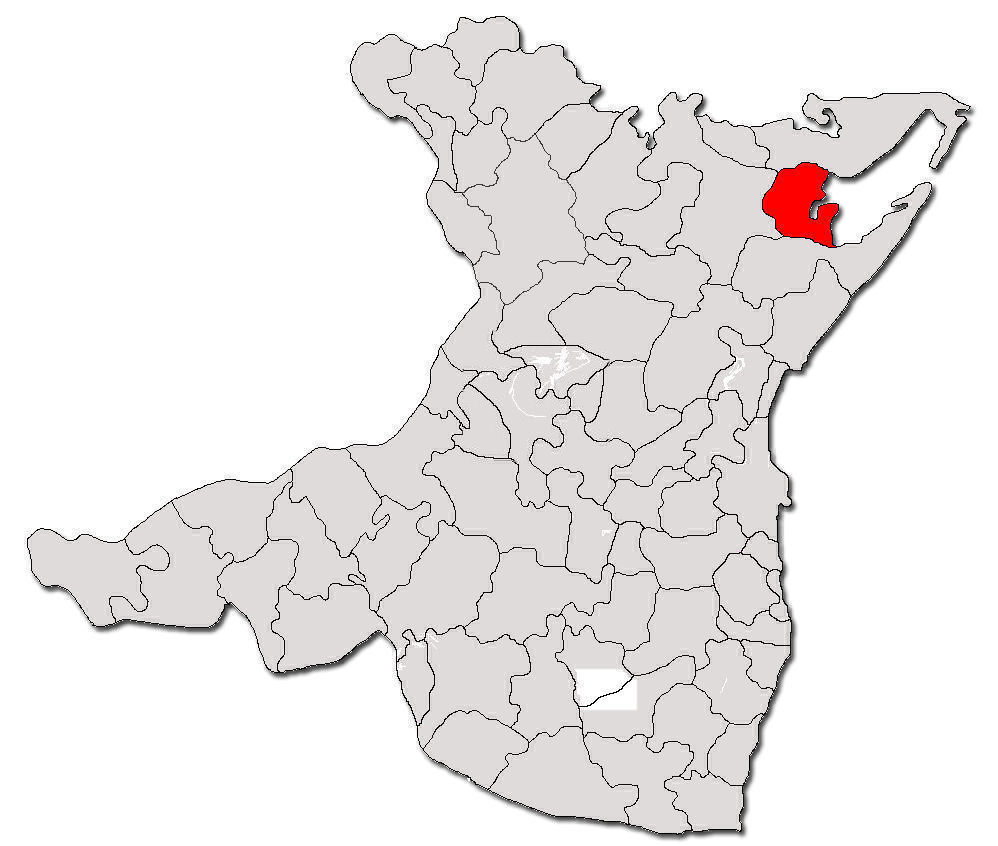
- Location in Constanța County

- Location in Romania
- Coordinates: 44°34′N 28°43′E
- Country: Romania
- County: Constanța
- Subdivisions: Istria, Nuntași

Government
  - Mayor (2020–2024): Mihai Ionescu (PSD)
- Area: 170.53 km^{2} (65.84 sq mi)
- Population (2021-12-01): 2,321
  - Density: 13.61/km^{2} (35.25/sq mi)
- Time zone: UTC+02:00 (EET)
  - Summer (DST): UTC+03:00 (EEST)
- Vehicle reg.: CT
- Website: www.primaria-istria.ro

Istria (Romanian pronunciation: [ˈistri.a]) is a commune in Constanța County, Northern Dobruja, Romania.

It is located between the lower Danube and the Dobruja coast of the Black Sea. The ancient site of Histria is found nearby.

Villages in the Istria commune:

- Istria (historical names: Caranasuf, Turkish: Karanasuf)
- Nuntași (historical names: Duingi, Turkish: Düğüncü)

== Demographics ==
At the 2011 census, Istria had 2,370 Romanians (99.54%), 6 Tatars (0.25%), 5 others (0.21%).
