= KOTR =

KOTOR or KOTR may refer to:

- Korea On The Rocks
- King of the Ring
- King of the Ronalds
- King of the Road (disambiguation)
- King of the Railway
- Kings of the Rollers
- Knights of the Old Republic (disambiguation)
- Knights of the Round (disambiguation)
- KOTR-LD, a low-power television station (channel 7, virtual 7) licensed to serve Monterey, California, United States
- KAAP-LP, a defunct low-power television station (channel 2) formerly licensed to serve Santa Cruz, California, which held the call sign KOTR-LP from 2005 to 2018
- KOTR (FM) 105.7, a FCC Part 15 Smooth Jazz Radio Station in Thousand Oaks, CA.
- KOTR FM (Radio Station) FCC Part 15 radio station located in Mountain Home, Arkansas
