= George Poole =

George Poole may refer to:

- George Amos Poole, I (1843–1918), American printer
- George Amos Poole, II (1874–1946), American printer
- George Amos Poole III (1907–1990), American printer
- George Ayliffe Poole (1809–1883), English clergyman and author
- SS George R. Poole, a Liberty ship

== See also ==
- George Temple-Poole (1856–1934), British architect and public servant
