= MapArt =

Canadian map publisher

The bright yellow cover of a map book published by MapArt

The MapArt Publishing Corporation was a Canadian cartography publisher founded in 1981 by Peter Heiler Ltd. that produces and prints yearly editions of maps for Canada and the United States. Headquartered in Oshawa, Ontario, MapArt is Canada's leading map publisher, producing more Canadian titles than any of its competitors and all settlements with a population over 5000 in Canada are covered in various editions. Its signature yellow cover is seen throughout the country at filling stations, convenience stores, and book, stationery, & office supply stores. MapArt Publishing grouped up with Rand McNally Maps and JDMGEO Maps, to create CCC Maps in 2013 but returned to publish under the MapArt banner in 2014. On May 1st, 2026 the MapArt Publishing filed for bankruptcy. Backroad Maps has acquired the MapArt brand and related business assets and relaunched the mapart.com website in September 2026.
