= Agnes Lee =

American poet (1862–1939)

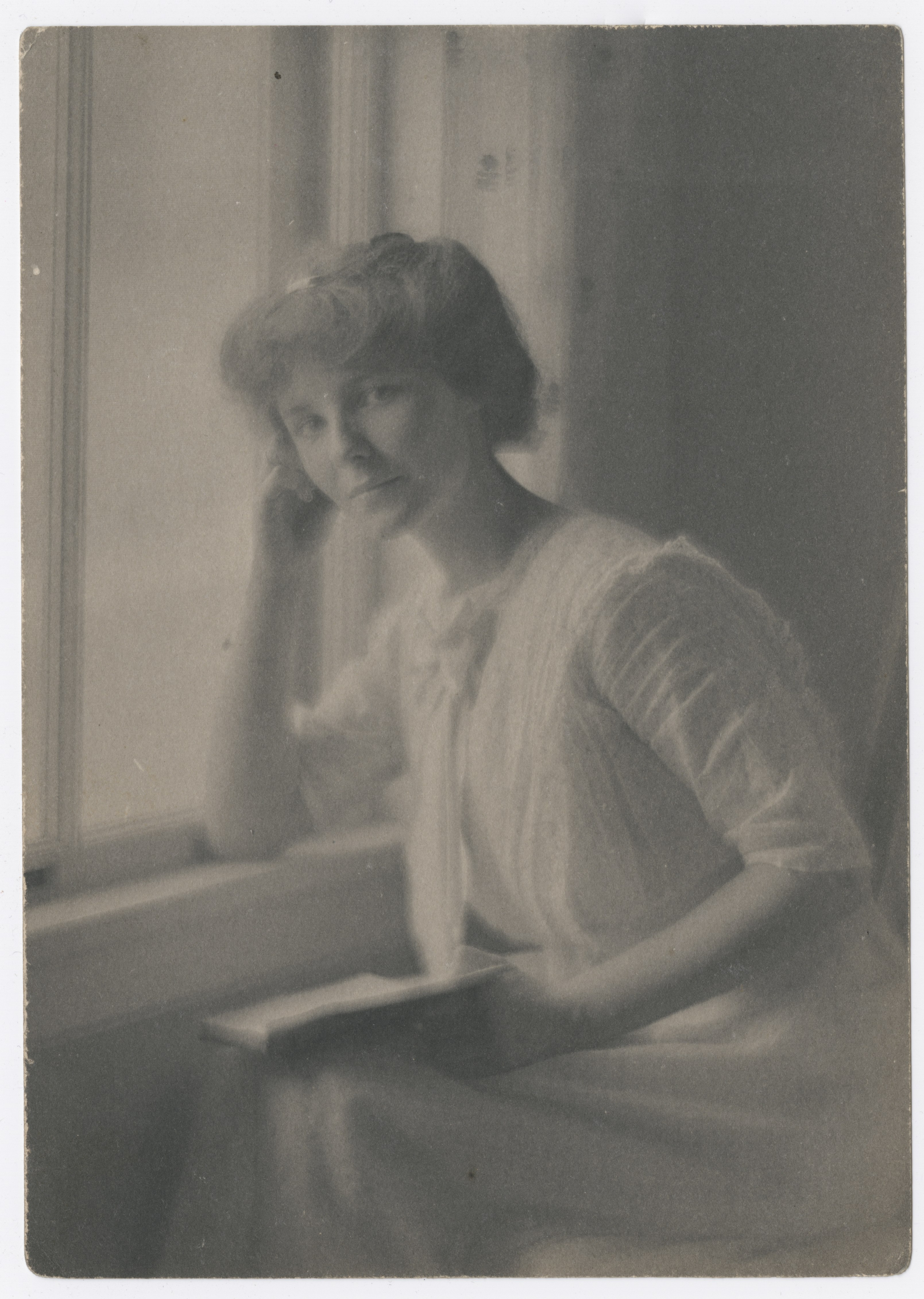
- Photo of Lee taken by her first husband, Francis Watts Lee
- Born: Martha Agnes Rand; March 6, 1862; Chicago, Illinois, U.S.
- Died: July 23, 1939 (aged 77); Chicago, Illinois, U.S.
- Resting place: Graceland Cemetery
- Spouses: Francis Watts Lee; Otto Freer
- Children: 1
- Parent(s): William H. Rand; Harriet H. Robinson

Agnes Lee (née Martha Agnes Rand; 1862–1939) was an American poet and translator.

== Biography ==
Lee was born Martha Agnes Rand in Chicago on March 6, 1862. (Note: Some sources give her birth year as 1868. Her gravestone shows March 24, 1862.) She was the second daughter of William H. Rand, an American printer and publisher who co-founded the Rand McNally Company. She was educated at a boarding school in Vevey, Switzerland.

Lee wrote a collection of children's verse in 1898 titled The Round Rabbit. Her debut poetry collection, The Legend of a Thought, was published in 1889. She wrote books of poetry including The Border of the Lake in 1910, The Sharing in 1914, Faces and Open Doors in 1922, and New Lyrics and a Few Old Ones in 1931. She translated Théophile Gautier's Enamels and Cameos and Other Poems in 1903. In 1926, Lee received the guarantor's prize from Poetry Magazine.

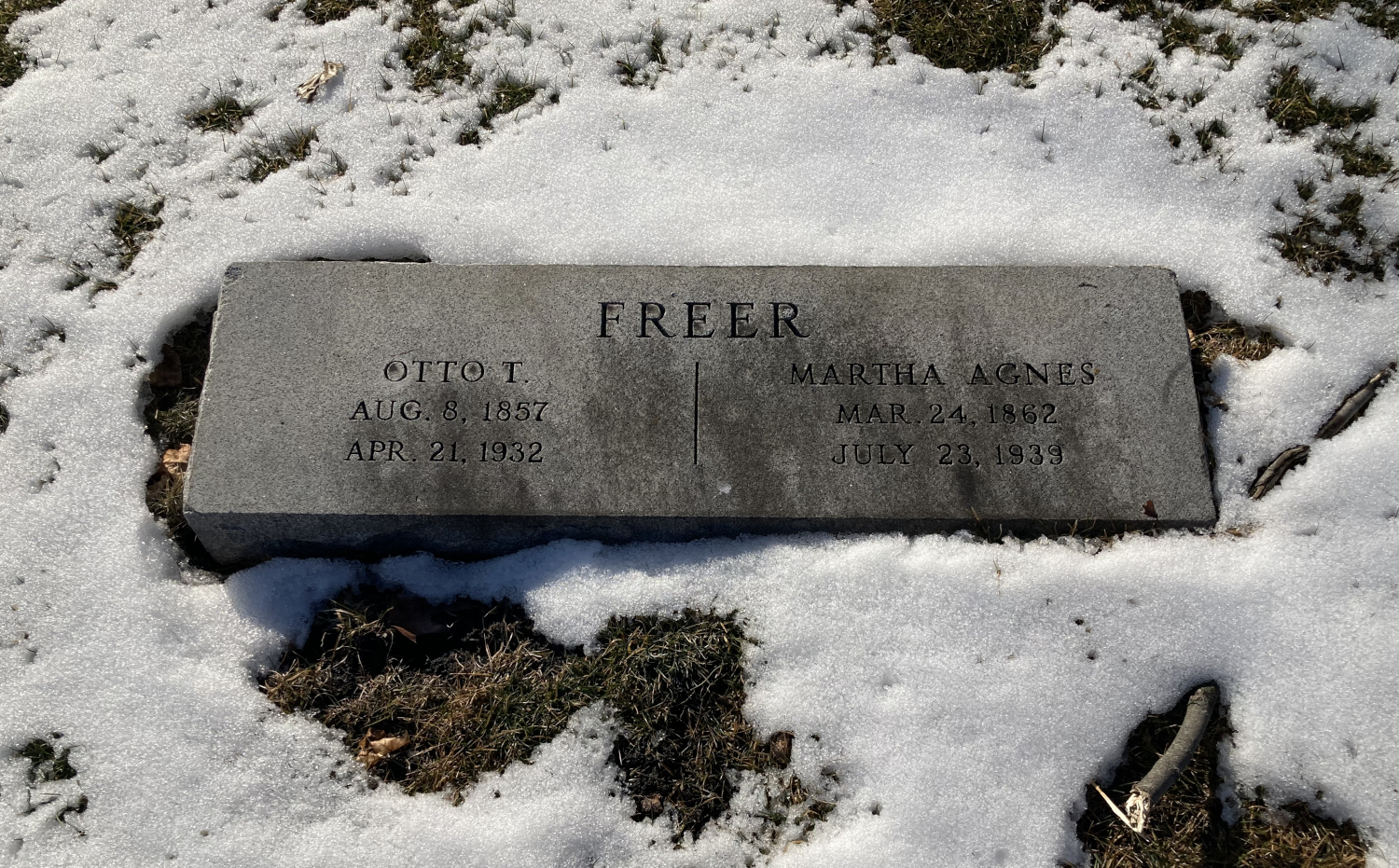
Lee's grave at Graceland Cemetery

In 1890 she married Francis Watts Lee, a photographer, and moved to Boston. They had a daughter. In 1911 she married Otto Freer, a surgeon. Her second husband died in 1932.

Lee died from pneumonia on July 23, 1939, at her home in Chicago. She was buried at Graceland Cemetery. A collection of letters exchanged between her and poet Edgar Lee Masters is archived in the Newberry Library in Chicago.
