= Los Angeles Star =

First newspaper in Los Angeles

- Type: Weekly (daily edition from 1870)
- Owner: See ownership history
- Founder(s): John Allen Lewis, John McElroy
- Editor: Henry Hamilton (1856–1864, 1868–1873)
- Founded: May 17, 1851
- Ceased publication: 1879
- Language: English and Spanish (Spanish section until 1855)
- Headquarters: Los Angeles, California
- Website: www.lastar.news

Los Angeles Star Spanish: Estrella de Los Ángeles
- Interactive map of Los Angeles Star; Spanish: Estrella de Los Ángeles
- 34°03′16″N 118°14′28″W
- Location: 300 block of North Main, Los Angeles, Ca

History
- Built: 1851

California Historical Landmark
- Designated: March 18, 1964
- Reference no.: 789

Los Angeles Star, known in Spanish as La Estrella de Los Ángeles, was the first newspaper published in Southern California, in Los Angeles, California. The publication ran from 1851 to 1879 and was written in both English and Spanish.

In 2025 The paper was revived and circulated as an e-mail only publication until it was re-launched online on Nov. 10, 2026 by Timothy Scheer, Owner of Consequence Media.

== History ==
=== Early history and background ===
The first proposition to establish a newspaper in Los Angeles was made to the city council October 16, 1850. The minutes of the meeting on that date contain this entry: "Theodore Foster petitions for a lot situated at the northerly corner of the jail for the purpose of erecting thereon a house to be used as a printing establishment. The council—taking in consideration the advantages which a printing house offers to the advancement of public enlightenment, and there existing as yet no such establishment in the city: Resolved. That for this once only a lot from amongst those that are marked on the city map be given to Mr. Theodore Foster for the purpose of establishing thereon a printing house; and the donation be made in his favor because he is the first to inaugurate this public benefit."

The location of the printing house was on what is now Los Angeles Street, then called Calle Zanja Madre (Mother Ditch street), and sometimes Canal street. This site of Foster’s printing office was opposite the Bell Block. On the lot granted by the council, Foster built a small two-story frame building. The lower story was occupied by the printing outfit, and the upper story was used as a living room by the printers and proprietors of the paper. Over the door was the Sign "Imprenta" (printing office).

The first number of the pioneer paper was issued May 17, 1851. It was named La Estrella de Los Angeles (Los Angeles Star). It was a four-page, five column paper; size of page, 12x18 inches. Two pages were printed in English and two in Spanish. The subscription price was US$10 a year, payable in advance. Advertisements were inserted at the rate of $2 per square for the first insertion and $1 for each subsequent insertion. The publishers were John Allen Lewis and John McElroy. Foster had dropped out of the establishment before the publication of the first issue. Two years later he committed suicide by drowning himself in the Fresno River.

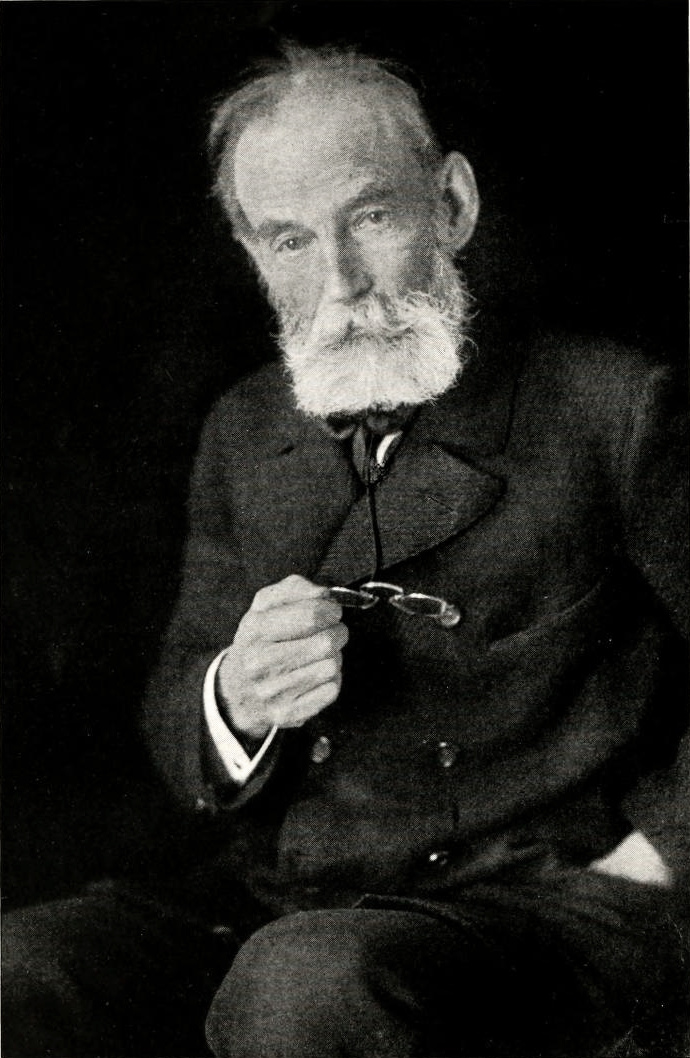
William H. Rand bought into the Star in July 1851 and later co-founded Rand McNally.

In July 1851, William H. Rand bought an interest in the paper and the firm became Lewis, McElroy & Rand. In November, McElroy sold his interest to Lewis & Rand. Lewis edited the English pages and Manuel Clemente Rojo was editor of the Spanish columns of the Star for some time after its founding. The press was an old Washington Hoe. It came around the Horn of Africa, a journey of six or seven months. Its circulation did not exceed 250 copies. The first job of city work done by La Estrella (as it is always called in the early records) was the printing of one hundred white ribbon badges for the city police. The inscription on the badge, which was printed both in English and Spanish, read "City Police, organized by the Common Council of Los Angeles, July 12, 1851." La Estrella’; the bill for the job was US$25.

=== 1853–55 ===
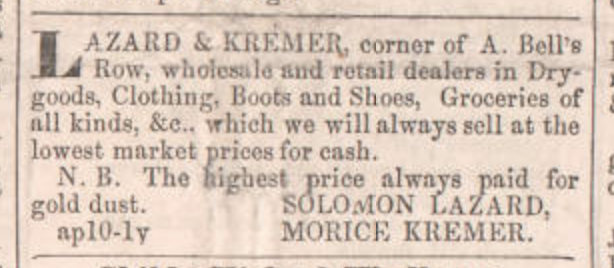
An advertisement from the Star, October 30, 1852

In July 1853, Rand transferred his interest in the Star to his partner Lewis. On August 1, 1853, Lewis sold the paper to James M. McMeans. The obstacles to be overcome in the publication of a pioneer newspaper in Southern California were described by Lewis in his final issue of the Star on July 30, 1853:

"It is now two years and three months since the Star was established in this city—and in taking leave of my readers, in saying my last say, I may very properly be permitted to look back through this period to see how accounts stand. The establishment of a newspaper in Los Angeles was considered something of an experiment, more particularly on account of the isolation of the city. The sources of public news are sometimes cut off for three or four weeks, and very frequently two weeks. San Francisco, the nearest place where a newspaper is printed, is more than five hundred miles distant, and the mail between that city and Los Angeles takes an uncertain course, sometimes by sea and sometimes by land, occupying in its transmission from two to six weeks, and in one instance, fifty-two days. Therefore, I have had to depend mainly upon local news to make the Star interesting. And yet the more important events of the country have been recorded as fully as the limits of the Star would permit. The printing of a paper one-half in the Spanish language was certainly an experiment hitherto unattempted in the state. Having no exchanges with papers in that language the main reliance has been upon translations and such contributions as several good friends have favored me with. I leave others to judge whether the ‘Estrella’ has been well or ill conducted."

Under Lewis’ management the Star was nonpartisan in politics. He says, "I professed all along to print an independent newspaper, and although my own preferences were with the Whig party, I never could see enough either in the Whig or Democratic party to make a newspaper of. I never could muster up fanaticism enough to print a party paper." McMeans went to the States shortly after assuming the management of the paper. William A. Wallace conducted it during his absence. Early in 1854 it was sold to M. D. Brundige. Under Brundige’s proprietorship, Wallace edited the paper. It was still published in the house built by Foster.

In the latter part of 1854, the Star was sold to J. S. Waite & Co. The site donated to Foster by the council in 1850, on which to establish a printing house for the advancement of public enlightenment, seems not to have been a part of the Star outfit. A prospectus on the Spanish page informs us that "Imprenta de la Estrella, Calle Principal, Casa de Temple"—that is, the printing office of the Star is on Main street, in the House of Temple, where was added, the finest typographical work will be done in Spanish, French and English. Waite reduced the subscription price of the Star to $6 a year, payable in advance, or $9 at the end of the year. Fifty percent advance on a deferred payment looks like a high rate of interest, but it was very reasonable in those days. Money, then, commanded five, ten and even as high as fifteen percent a month, compounded monthly; and yet the mines of California were turning out $50,000,000 in gold every year. Here is a problem in the supply and demand of a circulating medium for some of our astute financial theorists to solve.

In July 1855, the subscription price of the Star was reduced to US$5 a year. The publisher informed his patrons that he would receive subscriptions "payable in most kinds of produce after harvest—corn, wheat, flour, wood, butter, eggs, etc., will be taken on old subscriptions." In November 1855, Waite, the sole proprietor, publisher and business manager of the Star, was appointed postmaster of Los Angeles. He found it difficult to keep the Star shining, the mails moving and his produce exchange running.

=== 1856–64 ===
In the issue of February 2, 1856, he offers the "entire establishment of the Star for sale at US$1,000 less than cost." In setting forth its merits, he wrote: "To a young man of energy and ability a rare chance is now offered to spread himself and peradventure to realize a fortune." The young man with expansive qualities was found two months later in the person of William A. Wallace, who had been editor of the Star in 1854. He was the first principal of the school-house No. 1, which stood on the northwest corner of Spring and Second streets, where the Bryson Block subsequently was located. In his salutatory, he says: "The Star is an old favorite of mine, and I have always wished to be its proprietor." Two months later, Wallace became laid up.

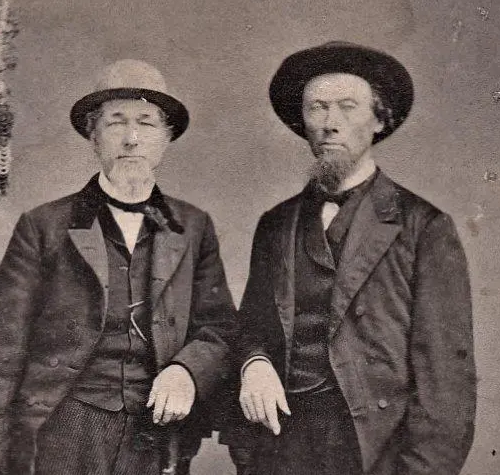
Henry Hamilton (left), proprietor of the Star 1856–1864 and 1868–1873, with William McKee, c. 1869

Henry Hamilton, the successor of Wallace, was an experienced newspaper man. For five years previous to purchasing the Star he had been proprietor of the Calaveras Chronicle. He was an editor of the old school—the school that dealt out column editorials, and gave scant space to locals. Hamilton’s forte was political editorials. He was a bitter partisan. He was an able writer. He was a Scotch-Irishman. His vigorous partisanship got him into trouble. During the American Civil War, he espoused the cause of the Confederate States of America. For some severe criticisms on Abraham Lincoln and other officers of the government, and his outspoken sympathy for the Confederates, he was arrested. He took the oath of allegiance, and was released, but the Star went into an eclipse. The last number, a single page, appeared October 1, 1864. The press and type were sold to Phineas Banning, and were used in the publication of the Wilmington Journal.

=== Last years: 1868–79 ===
On Saturday, May 16, 1868, the Star emerged from obscurity. "Today," wrote Hamilton, "we resume the publication of the Los Angeles Star. Nearly four years have elapsed since our last issue. The little ‘onpleasantness,’ which at that time existed in the family, has toned down considerably, and if perfect harmony does not yet pervade the circle, our hope is this brotherly feeling will soon be consummated." The paper was no longer the bitter partisan sheet that it had been during the early 1860s. Hamilton now seldom indulged in political leaders of a column length, and when he did they were of a mild type. The new Star was a seven column blanket sheet, and was devoted to promoting the welfare of the county. It was ably conducted, and was a model newspaper for a town of 5,000 inhabitants. June 1, 1870, the first number of the Daily Star was published by Hamilton & Barter. Barter retired from the firm in September and founded the Anaheim Gazette, the pioneer newspaper of Orange County, California. He bought the old press and type of the Wilmington Journal—the first press of the Star—and again the old press became a pioneer. When the Anaheim Gazette office burned down in 1877, the old press perished in the flames.

After G. W. Barter sold out the Anaheim Gazette in 1872, he leased the Daily Star from Hamilton. He ran it less than a year, but that was long enough for him to take all the twinkle out of it. It had almost sunk below the horizon when Hamilton resumed its publication. In July 1873, he sold it to Ben C. Truman. Truman put sparkle in it. He made it interesting to his friends, and equally so to his enemies. Truman continued its publication until July 1877, when it was sold to Paynter & Company. Then it passed to Brown & Company. The Rev. Campbell of the Methodist Church South conducted it for a time. In the last year of its existence, it had several different publishers and editors. Its brilliancy steadily diminished until in the early part of 1879 when the sheriff attached it for debt, and its publication was discontinued. The plant and the files were stored in an outbuilding of Mr. Hollenbeck’s, who was one of the principal creditors. His Chinese laborers roomed in the lower part of the building, and after setting fire to the house, destroyed what remained of The Star.

== Ownership and editorship history ==
The Los Angeles Star changed hands often during its 28 years. At least a dozen proprietors, partnerships and lessees ran it. Its early publishers worked in an isolated town where news from San Francisco could take weeks to arrive. Circulation was small (no more than 250 copies at first), and money was so short that one owner accepted farm produce as payment for subscriptions. Publication stopped twice. The first time was in 1864, after its Confederate-sympathizing editor was arrested. The second was in 1879, when the sheriff attached the paper for debt.

Proprietors and editors of the Los Angeles Star
Years	Proprietors / publishers	Key editors and significant notes
1851–1853	John Allen Lewis and John McElroy; William H. Rand (later co-founder of Rand McNally) joined July 1851 (Lewis, McElroy & Rand)	First issue May 17, 1851. Theodore Foster, who received the city lot for the printing office, dropped out before the first issue. Lewis edited the English pages and Manuel Clemente Rojo edited the Spanish columns, which ran until 1855. McElroy sold his interest to Lewis & Rand in November 1851. Rand transferred his interest to Lewis in July 1853. Lewis ran the paper as nonpartisan.
1853–1854	James M. McMeans	Bought the paper from Lewis on August 1, 1853. He left for the eastern states soon after, and William A. Wallace ran the paper while he was away.
1854	M. D. Brundige	Bought the paper early in 1854. Wallace stayed on as editor.
1854–1856	J. S. Waite & Co.	Took over in late 1854 and moved the office to Temple's building on Main Street. Cut the subscription price to $6 a year, then to $5 in July 1855, and took produce as payment. Waite was named Los Angeles postmaster in November 1855 and put the paper up for sale in February 1856.
1856	William A. Wallace	Bought the paper about two months after the sale notice. He was the city's first schoolhouse principal and had edited the Star in 1854. He fell ill about two months later.
1856–1864	Henry Hamilton	Previously proprietor of the Calaveras Chronicle. Hamilton was a Scotch-Irish partisan editorialist who supported the Confederacy during the Civil War. He was arrested in October 1862 for his attacks on Abraham Lincoln and federal officials, and released after taking the oath of allegiance. The last issue, a single page, appeared October 1, 1864.
1864–1868	Suspended	The press and type were sold to Phineas Banning and used to print the Wilmington Journal.
1868–1873	Henry Hamilton; Hamilton & Barter (1870); G. W. Barter, lessee (c. 1872–1873)	Resumed May 16, 1868, as a seven-column paper with a milder, community-focused tone. The Daily Star launched June 1, 1870. Barter left in September 1870 to found the Anaheim Gazette. He later leased the Daily Star for less than a year, and readership dropped until Hamilton took it back.
1873–1877	Ben C. Truman	Bought the paper in July 1873 and revived it. Sold it in July 1877.
1877–1879	Paynter & Co.; Brown & Co.; Rev. Campbell (Methodist Church South); others	Several publishers and editors in its last year as the paper declined. The sheriff attached it for debt in early 1879 and publication ended. The plant and files, stored in a building owned by creditor Mr. Hollenbeck, were later destroyed by fire.
2025	Consequence Media, Los Angeles, CA - Timothy Scheer	Acquired the rights to revive the publication and launched in January of 2025 as an invite only publication until its web soft launch Nov. 10, 2026
