= George Amos Poole, I =

American printer and publisher (1843–1918)

George Amos Poole
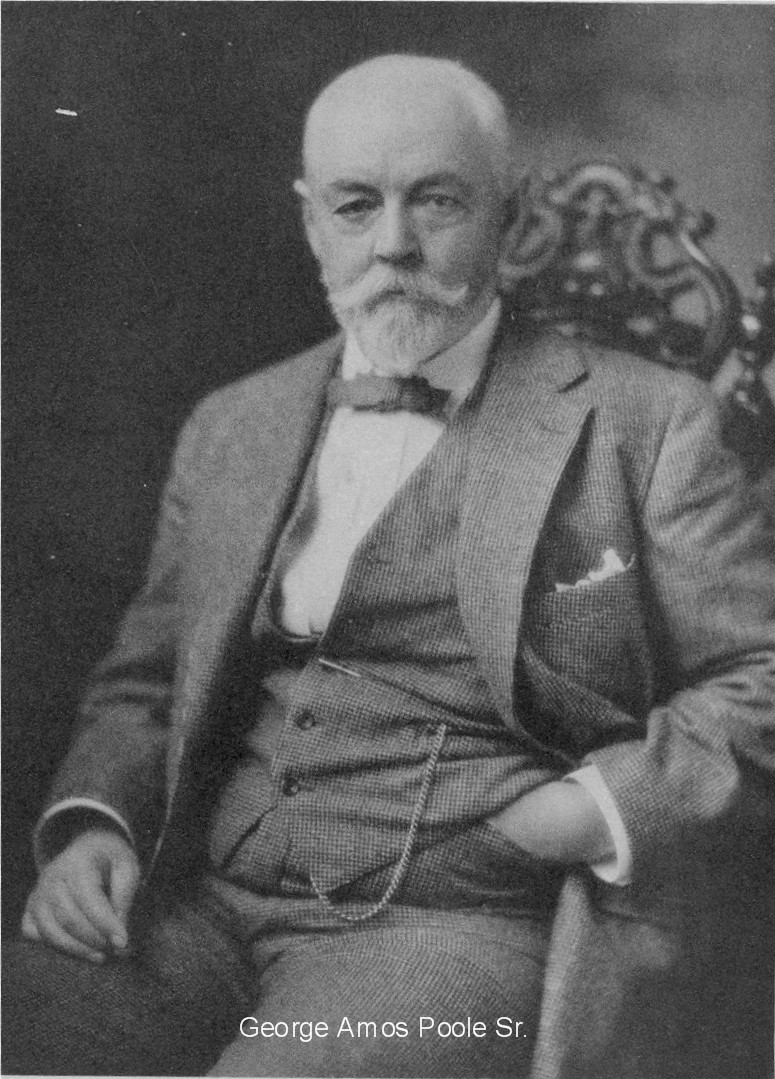
- Born: George Amos Poole; March 20, 1843; Milton, Massachusetts
- Died: September 7, 1918 (aged 75); Holland, Michigan
- Occupation: Printer/industrialist
- Spouse: Abbie Kelly Kendall
- Children: Abbie Stuart; Kate; George Amos, Jr. George Amos Poole, II; Frederick Arthur; Stephen Kendall; Lois
- Parent(s): Amos Poole; Caroline Curtis Rand

George Amos Poole (March 20, 1843 – September 7, 1918) was an American printer and industrialist. He was a founding member of Rand McNally and Company and became the organization's first treasurer. He later parted with the company to start his own venture with his brother. This was the start of his company, Poole Brothers Printing.

== Early life ==
He spent quite a bit of his childhood in Milton, Massachusetts and came west in 1866, for certain years representing the apparel firm of Philip Wadsworth and Company, of Boston. His obligations took him over a decent piece of what was then the "wild" west, quite a bit of which west of the Missouri River he was obliged to cover by the antiquated stage coach or by stream vessels when the waterway was sufficiently high.

== Career in Chicago ==
Several years later, with his uncle, William H. Rand and Andrew McNally, he formed an association which acquired the job printing plant of the Chicago Tribune. This organization was later consolidated under the name of Rand McNally and Company, of which concern he was treasurer until 1879, when with his brother, William H. Poole, he established the printing house of Poole Bros.

Poole Bros. Map

For a long time the work of the firm was limited to printing for transportation organizations, with a support that included for all intents and purposes nearly every railroad in the nation. The concern had the refinement of being the largest one in the United States solely occupied with transportation printing, yet in later years the business was extended until it appreciated an enormous commercial support too. George Amos Poole was constantly intrigued with the welfare of the printing business, just as in the notoriety and achievement of his own business. In 1887, together with Andrew McNally, J. M. W. Jones, D. R. Cameron, and C. A. Knight, well-known Chicago printers at that time, he addressed to a call to the printers of the whole United States to assemble in Chicago as they considered the conditions around then ripe for the development of a national printers' association. This gathering was held, and in it the United Typothetae of America had its origin.

== Retirement ==
After his retirement from the dynamic administration of the business in 1912, he invested his energy primarily at his summer home near Holland, Michigan, and at his winter home in Coconut Grove, Florida, holding his residence in Chicago. He was especially interested in yachts and yachting, and was prominent in that field. He was a Mason and a member of the Union League, Flossmoor Country, Windsor Golf, and Biscayne Bay Yacht, clubs.

== See also ==
- Poole Bros., Inc.
- George Amos Poole, III; grandson
