= Hammond Map =

American map company

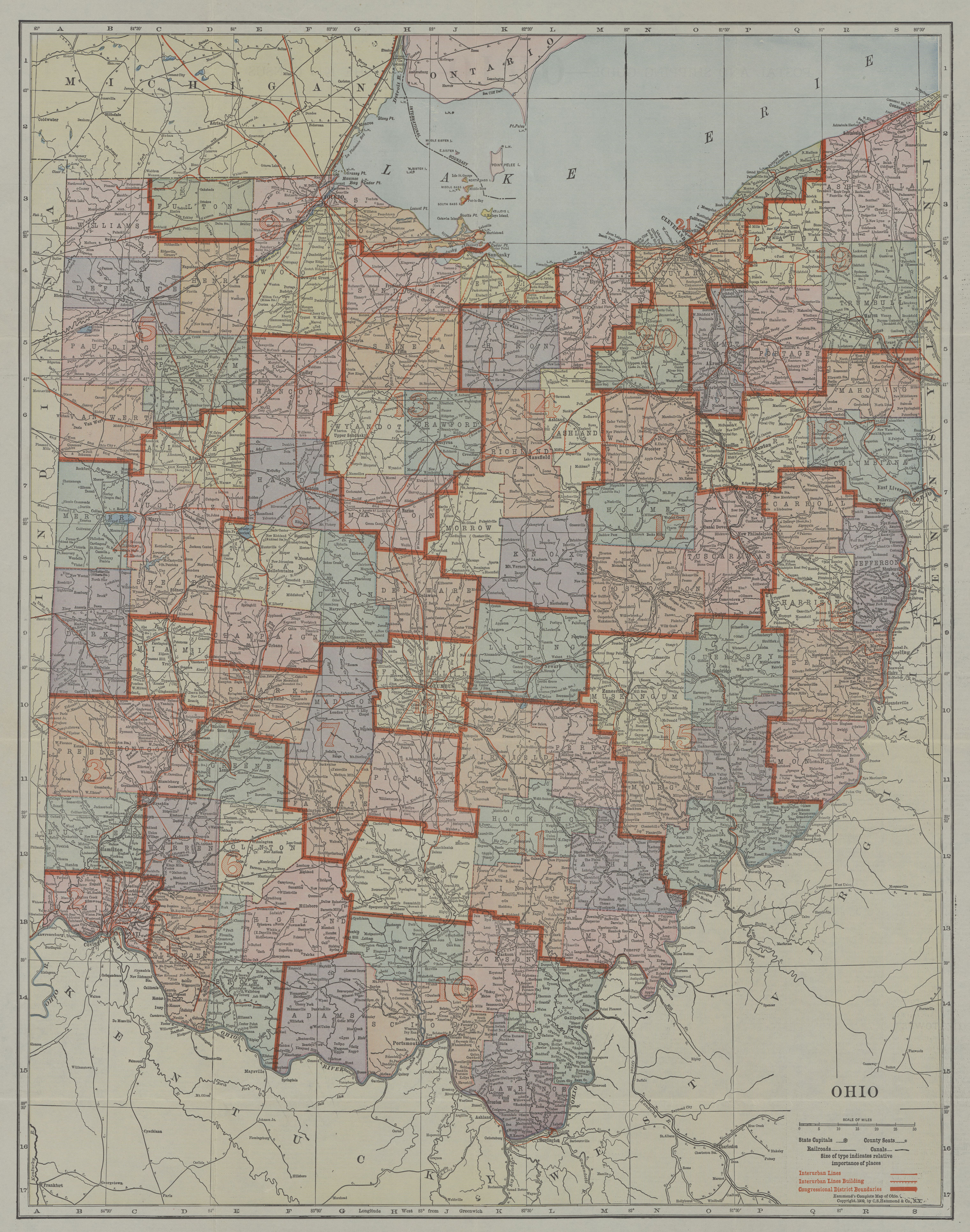
Hammond's Complete Map of Ohio, 1909

Hammond Map or Hammond World Atlas Corporation is an American map company. It was formerly an operating subsidiary of the Langenscheidt Publishing Group, a major map publisher in the United States, but was sold to Universal Map, an affiliate of Kappa Publishing Group, in 2010. Langenscheidt retained the rights to Hammond Publishing products.

The company was founded in 1900 in Brooklyn, New York by Caleb Stillson Hammond, who had previously headed Rand McNally's New York City office since 1894. It was formally incorporated in 1901 as C. S. Hammond & Co. and moved to Manhattan. It soon relocated to a warehouse in Maplewood, New Jersey that was near Hammond's family home.

During its heyday in 1950s and 1960s, it was second only to Rand McNally, which made a point of refusing to include Maplewood in any of the company's maps. Until the advent of digital mapping from Google Earth predecessor Keyhole in the mid-2000s, it provided the mapping technology for CNN, Headline News and CCN (Columbia High School (New Jersey)'s Television Network).

The company was privately owned by the Hammond family until its assets were acquired by Langenscheidt Publishers Inc. in 1999.
