= King of the Road =

King of the Road may refer to:

== Music ==
- "King of the Road" (song), a 1965 song by Roger Miller
- King of the Road (album), an album by Fu Manchu
- King of the Road, an EP by The Proclaimers

== Other uses ==
- King of the Road (skateboarding), a contest sponsored by Thrasher magazine
- King of the Road Map Service, an American map company
- Hard Truck 2: King of the Road, the European version of the video game Hard Truck 2
- Lucas Industries#King of the Road, a brand name used for a range of bicycle equipment produced by Lucas Industries
