= William H. Rand =

American printer (1828–1925)

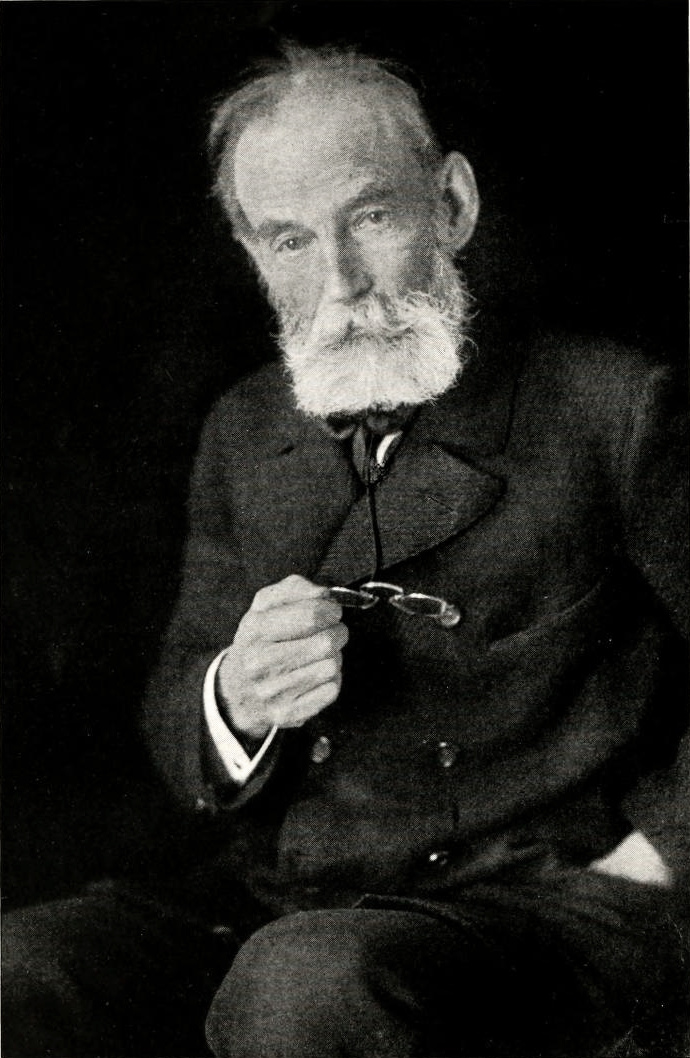
William H. Rand

William Henry Rand (May 2, 1828 – June 20, 1915) was an American printer and newspaper publisher. He was the co-founder and president of the Rand McNally publishing company. He co-founded the Los Angeles Star and was one of the owners of the Chicago Tribune.

== Early life ==
Rand was born on May 2, 1828 in Quincy, Massachusetts. He was one of the twelve children of Rev. John Rand. Rand's boyhood home was East Milton, Massachusetts. He was educated at local schools.

As a young man was an apprentice a print shop of his brothers Franklin and George Rand in Boston, Massachusetts. Rand was enticed west in September 1849, by the California Gold Rush, travelling by ship around Cape Horn.

== Career ==
After looking for gold for a year without success, Rand settled in Los Angeles, California. He co-founded the city's first newspaper, the Los Angeles Star, in 1850 with John Lewis. It was also the first newspaper in Southern California.

In 1856, Rand returned to Boston for a short time before moving to Chicago, Illinois and opening a print shop in June 1856. In 1859, he hired an Irish immigrant, Andrew McNally, to work in his shop for nine dollars a week. They began printing the Chicago Tribune in 1859, with Rand becoming part owner of the newspaper.

After the Civil War, Rand sold his printing business. Rand and McNally, who had advanced to be a foreman, formed Rand, McNally & Company in 1868. They took over printing the Chicago Tribune and secured the contract to print the timetables and tickets for Chicago's railroads. Rand, McNally published the first railroad guide, the Western Railway Guide, in 1869. In 1870, they began printing business directories, an illustrated newspaper, and railroad guides.

The new business was successful but was burned in the Great Chicago Fire of 1871. Rand and McNally restarted their business next three days later in a rented building. Rand and McNally had protected two their printing machines from the fire by burying them in sand.

Rand left he business from 1871 to 1875 for health reasons. However, the business incorporated in 1873, with Rand as president. He returned to work in 1876, retiring as president of Rand McNally in 1894. The company became largest map publisher in the United States.

Rand was noted for making many advances in printing. He organized a syndicate in 1885 with Stilson Hutchins, Whitelaw Reid, William Henry Smith, Melville Elijah Stone, and others which created the Mergenthaler linotype.

== Personal life ==
Rand married Harriet Husted Robinson of Boston in 1855. They had three daughters and two sons, including Agnes Lee and William Rand Jr.

Rand's health declined in 1871. He took his family abroad and lived in Germany, France, and Switzerland for five years. When he retired in 1894, Rand returned to his boyhood home of East Milton and spent his summers in Martha's Vineyard, Massachusetts. His wife died in 1905.

Rand was a founder of the Chicago Normal Training School, now Chicago State University. He was president of the Newsboys' Home and was a charter member of the Chicago Commercial Club. Rand was a member of the Episcopal Church.

Rand died on June 20, 1915 at his daughter's home in New Canaan, Connecticut, after being ill for some time.
