= King of the Road Map Service =

American map company

King of the Road Map Service was a map publishing and distribution company based out of Mill Creek, Washington. Library of Congress records for the company date back to 1982. It was acquired by Rand McNally in 1999. During its existence, it produced maps for the Pacific Northwest, including Washington, Oregon, and Idaho Many of its titles were produced by Thomas Brothers, which was also acquired by Rand McNally.

One of the cartographers creating maps for King of the Road Map Service was Robert B. Lindquist. His business "Bob's Map Service" opened in February 1976 in Bellingham, Washington. Lindquist died in February 2007 after 31 years as a map maker.
