= George Amos Poole, II =

American printer (1874–1946)

George Amos Poole, Jr.
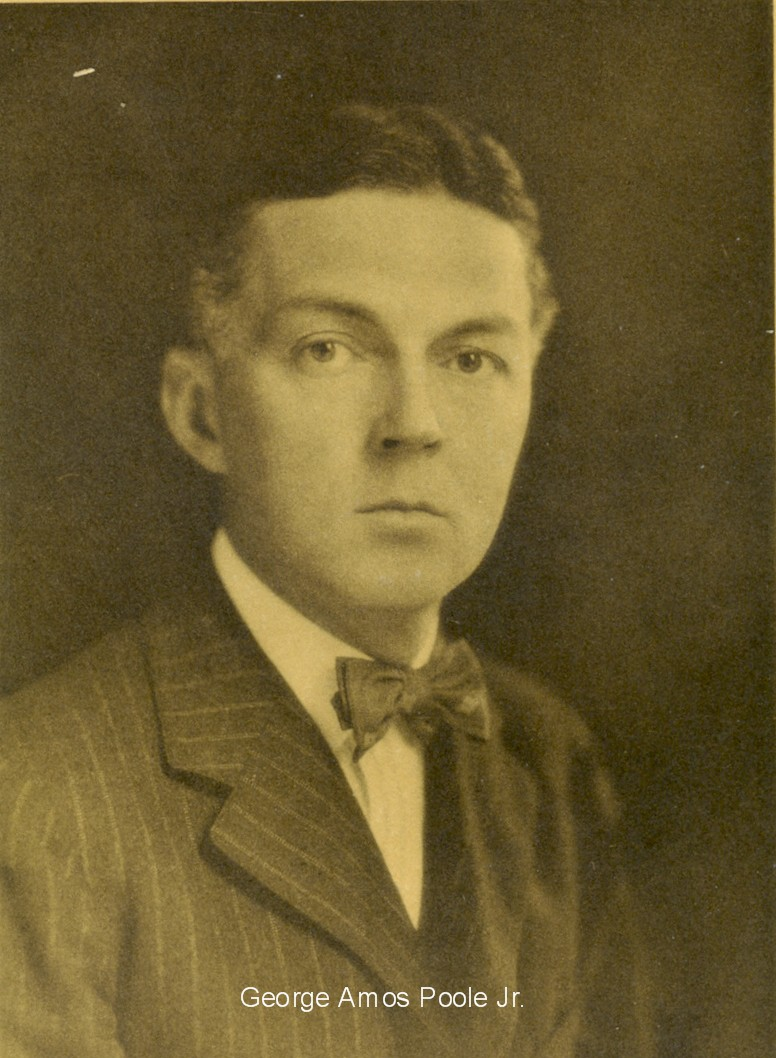
- Born: George Amos Poole, Jr. August 10, 1874; Chicago, Illinois
- Died: May 15, 1946 (aged 71); Chicago, Illinois
- Occupation: Printer/Business Executive
- Spouse: Elizabeth Constance Rogers
- Children: Elizabeth Rogers Poole; George Amos Poole III
- Parent(s): George Amos Poole, I Abbie Kelly Kendall

George Amos Poole, Jr. (August 10, 1874 – May 15, 1946) was an American printer and business executive. He became the second president of the company, Poole Brothers Printing.

== Early life ==
George Amos Poole, Jr. was born on August 10, 1874, at Chicago, Illinois. He was educated in the Chicago Public School system. In 1891, at the age of 17, he entered the employ of Poole Bros., Railway Printers. On October 23, 1900, he married Elizabeth Constance Rogers, the daughter of Doctor William E. Rogers, of Memphis, Tennessee.

== Career ==
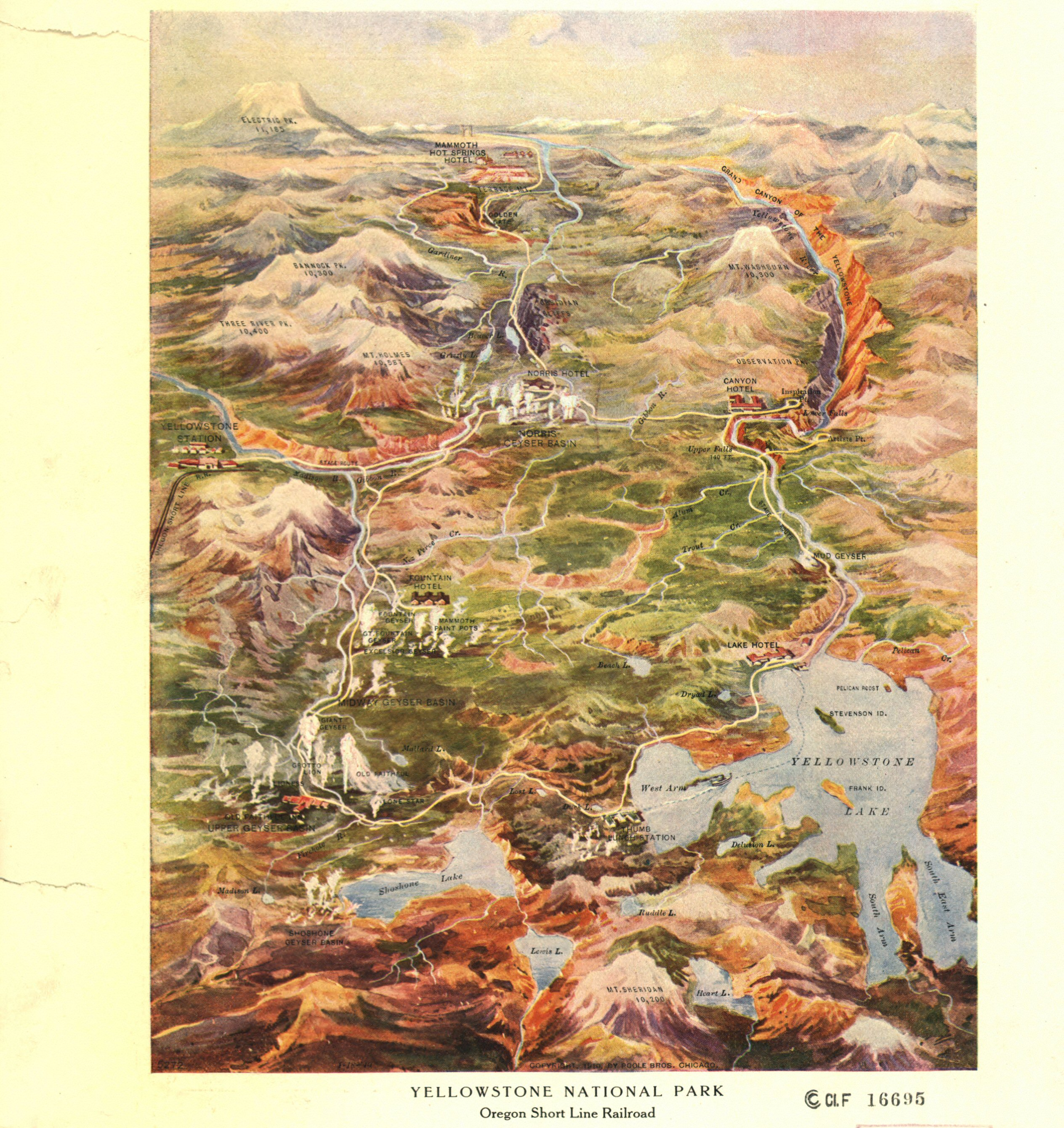
Poole Bros. Map of Yellowstone National Park

After working at Poole Bros. for 12 years, George Amos Poole, Jr. was made the vice president in 1903. After the death of his father, George Amos Poole, Sr. in 1918, he subsequently became the new president of Pool Brothers. While at the firm, he helped to build up the company to become one of the three most important in Chicago and one of the largest printers in the nation. Poole Bros. primarily printed maps and railway tickets.

== Later life ==
Poole had two children: Elizabeth Rogers Poole and George Amos Poole, III. He maintained a residence in Chicago and at Holland, Michigan, until his death in 1946. He was a member of the Union League, Chicago Athletic, Flossmoor Country, South Shore Country, and Opera, clubs.

== See also ==
- Poole Bros., Inc.
- George Amos Poole, I; father
- George Amos Poole, III; son
