= John Allen Lewis =

American 19th century newspaper editor

John Allen Lewis (1819–1895) was an American newspaper editor who later became interested in American history, producing many works on the subject. In 1851 he established and became the editor of the Los Angeles Star, the first newspaper published in Los Angeles, California. Lewis came into printing and editing at an early age working for another newspaper editor in Massachusetts.

== Early years ==
Lewis was born on November 23, 1819, in Barnstable, Massachusetts. At the age of eleven, Lewis began to set type in the office of The Barnstable Patriot, and he later found employment in other newspaper offices in the Boston area. His father was Josiah Lewis, also of Barnstable. His paternal ancestor was George Lewis (Lewice, Lewes), who settled in Plymouth Colony in Massachusetts. At eleven years of age Lewis apprenticed under the printing office of S. B. Phinney also from Barnstable who founded The Barnstable Patriot in 1830, Cape Cod's oldest newspaper.

== Career ==
In 1849, when the California Gold Rush occurred, Lewis moved to San Francisco, California, taking his printing press, and after editing a newspaper there for a short time, he took as a partner a relative and established the Los Angeles Star in Los Angeles.

The first issue of this "pioneer" newspaper was issued on May 17, 1851, and was entitled, La Estrella de Los Angeles. (The Star of Los Angeles). It consisted of four pages with five column each. The first two pages were printed in English and the following two in Spanish. Lewis edited the two English pages, while Manuel Clemente Rojo edited the two in Spanish. After some two and a half years from its first publication, the Los Angeles Star was completely out of Lewis' hands by August 1, 1853.

Foster's printing shop was located opposite the Bell block, which stood on the south-east corner of Aliso and Los Angeles streets. As managing editor of the Star, Lewis' editorial policy was non-partisan in politics, maintaining that,

"I professed all along to print an independent newspaper, and although my own preferences were with the Whig Party, I never could see enough either in the Whig or Democratic Party to make a newspaper of. I never could muster up fanaticism enough to print a party paper."

The prospect of establishing a newspaper in mid-nineteenth century Los Angeles proved to be somewhat difficult and something of an experiment for Lewis. The closest major source of news was San Francisco, which was more than 500 miles distant, where Lewis had to depend on the mails, either by sea or overland, which took anywhere from two to six weeks to arrive. Subsequently Lewis' journalistic pursuits were mostly limited to local news in and around Los Angeles, and where any word of out of town news was often considerably dated.

Lewis's journalist writings in his newspaper were praised for their accuracy and research and many contemporary newspaper editors regarded him as a most valued contributor.

Upon his return to Boston, Lewis married Elizabeth Ritchie, the daughter of Uriah Ritchie, a resident of the old North End.

Lewis has written many dozens of works which are listed in Catalogue of a collection of early New England books made by the late John Allen Lewis and now in the Boston Public Library. He intended to make his books and his knowledge of early Massachusetts history useful to students.

He was also connected with the Illinois Central Railroad, and lived in Chicago for approximately five years. The remainder of his life was spent in Boston, where he died on November 2, 1885, at the age of 65; he is buried at Mount Auburn Cemetery in Massachusetts.

== See also ==
- History of newspapers in California

== Sources ==
- Guinn, James Miller (1915). A History of California and an Extended History of Los Angeles and Environs: Also Containing Biographies of Well-Known Citizens of the Past and Present. Vol. I. Los Angeles: Historic Record Co.
- Boston Public Library (1892). Catalogue of a collection of early New England books made by the late John Allen Lewis and now in the Boston Public Library. Vol. 1. Boston Public Library.
- McCorkle, Julia Norton (1915–1916). "A History of Los Angeles Journalism". Annual Publication of the Historical Society of Southern California. 10 (1 & 2). University of California Press on behalf of the Historical Society of Southern California: 24–43. doi:10.2307/41168909. JSTOR 41168909.
- New England Historic Genealogical Society (1907). Memorial biographies of the New England Historic Genealogical Society. Vol. VIII. New England Historic Genealogical Society.
