= Street Finder =

- Developer: Rand McNally
- Release: 1995
- Operating system: Windows
- Type: Mapping

Street Finder is a mapping platform created by Rand McNally.

== Summary ==
Street Finder lets the user locate hotels, motels and restaurants. The user can select map styles to suit their individual taste.

== Development ==
Street Finder was developed by Rand McNally, a company founded in 1856.

== Reception ==
CNET recommended the 1997 edition of Street Finder with praise going to the program's map customizations and interactive airport maps. Los Angeles Times called Street Finder's map page feature "great".

Street Finder ranked third on SoftTrends list of most popular reference software in May 1996, based on unit sales, and twelfth on PC Data's list of Top-Selling Personal Productivity Software for July 1997. It was a finalist in the Best Niche Market Software Program category in the 1996 CODiE Awards.
