= Poole Brothers =

Publishing company

Poole Brothers was a publishing company founded in 1870 by George Amos and William H. Poole. George was previously a co-founder of Rand, McNally & Co. in 1868 and served as its first treasurer. He then left the organization to form Poole Brothers with William. The company was the largest printing house in the country that catered to transportation companies. According to The Inland Printer, "practically every railroad in the country" used Poole Brothers materials. Poole Brothers later expanded to print periodicals, including Advertising Age, Playboy, and the New England Journal of Medicine.

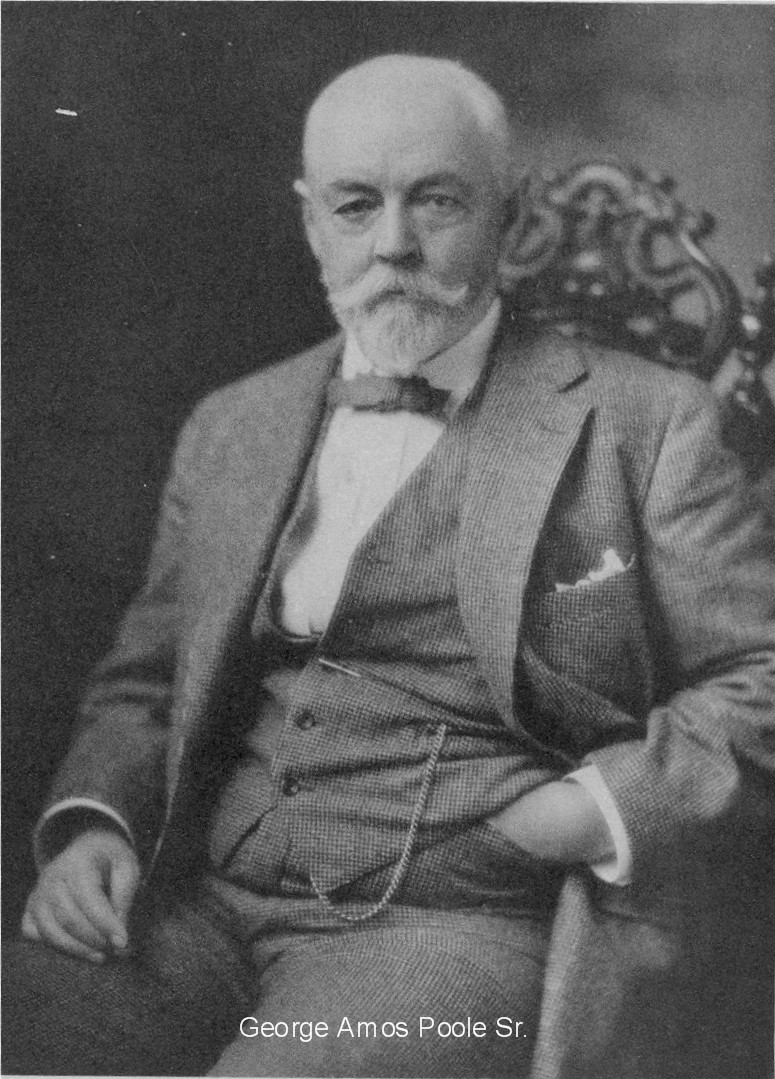
Image of George Amos Poole, Co-founder of Poole Bros.

Historic map printed by Poole Bros. of Chicago.

== See also ==
- George Amos Poole, founder
- George Amos Poole III, grandson of the founder and collector
