= Knights of the Round =

Knights of the Round may refer to:

- Knights of the Round Table, knights in the court of King Arthur
- Knights of the Round (video game), a 1991 video game by Capcom
- Knights of the Round, an organization in the anime television series Code Geass
