= Knights of the Old Republic =

There have been a number of Knights of the Old Republic products.

- Tales of the Jedi: Knights of the Old Republic, a 1990s comic book miniseries
- Star Wars: Knights of the Old Republic, a role-playing Star Wars video game released in 2003
- Star Wars Knights of the Old Republic II: The Sith Lords, the 2004 sequel to Star Wars: Knights of the Old Republic
- Star Wars: Knights of the Old Republic (comics), a comic book spin-off of the 2003 video game
- Star Wars: The Old Republic, a massively multiplayer online role-playing game released in December 2011.
