= Andrew McNally =

Irish-American publisher (1836–1904)

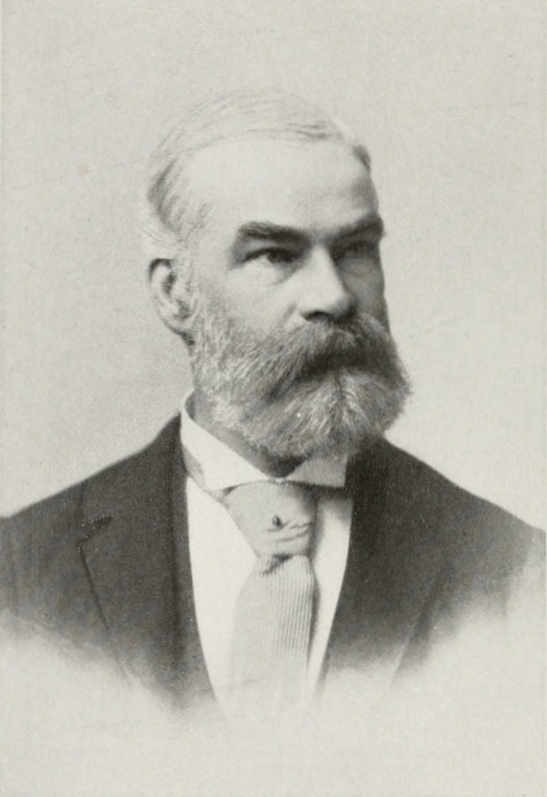
- Born: March 4, 1836; Armagh, Ireland
- Died: May 7, 1904 (aged 68); Altadena, California
- Burial place: Graceland Cemetery
- Occupations: Businessman, publisher
- Spouse: Delia Hyland McNally
- Children: 4

Andrew McNally (1836–1904) was an Irish publisher and co-founder of the company Rand McNally.

== Early life ==
On March 4, 1836, McNally was born in Armagh, Ireland.

== Career ==
A printer by trade, he moved to Chicago in 1858 and got a job in a print shop owned by William H. Rand at a wage of $9 per week.

In 1873, McNally and William H. Rand incorporated Rand, McNally & Co. With William H. Rand as president and McNally as vice president. Rand, McNally & Co. becoming one of the largest and best-known map publishers in history.

In 1888, McNally purchased 2,300 acres of Southern California land known as Rancho Los Coyotes from the Abel Stearns Rancho Trust. Rancho Los Coyotes later became known as the cities of Cerritos, La Mirada, Stanton, and Buena Park.

After Rand retired in 1899, McNally was president until his unexpected death from pneumonia in 1904 at his winter home in Altadena, California. For nearly 100 years the company was majority owned and led by generations of the McNally family. In 1997, the family divested its majority stake for a reported $500 million.

== Personal life ==
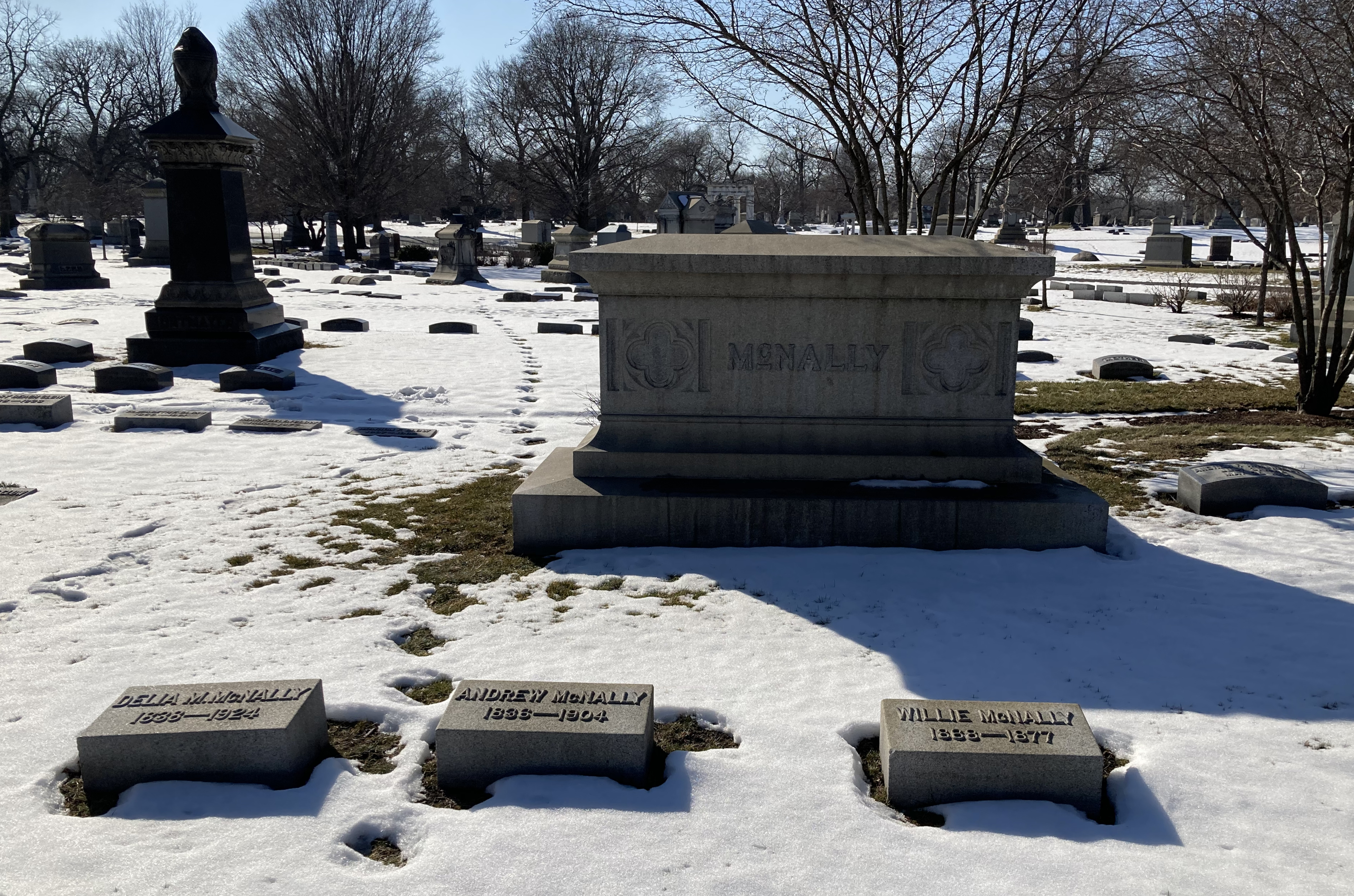
McNally's grave at Graceland Cemetery

In 1857, McNally immigrated to New York City, New York.

In 1860, McNally married Delia Hyland. They had four children, Frederick G, Elizabeth, Helen, and Nannie.

In 1880, McNally moved to California.

On May 7, 1904, McNally died in Altadena, California. On May 14, 1904, McNally's funeral services were held in Chicago, Illinois. He was buried at Graceland Cemetery.
