= Thomas Guide =

American series of street atlases

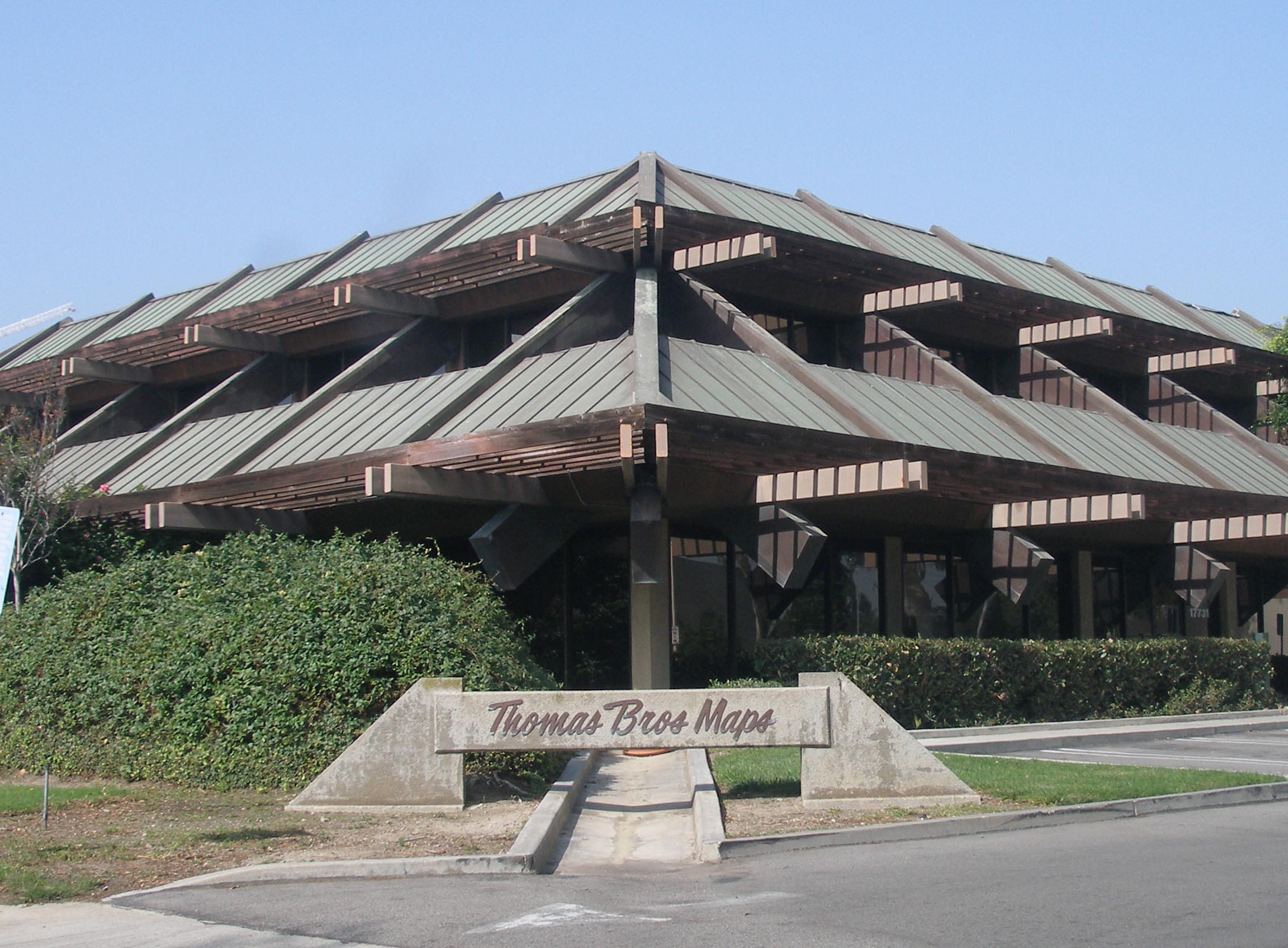
The former Thomas Bros. building, 17731 Cowan, Irvine, California

Thomas Guide is a series of paperback, spiral-bound atlases featuring detailed street maps of various large metropolitan areas in the United States, including Boise, Las Vegas, Los Angeles, Oakland, Phoenix, Portland, Reno-Tahoe, Sacramento, San Francisco, Seattle, Tucson, and Baltimore-Washington metropolitan area. Road Atlas titles are Arizona including Las Vegas, California Including portions of Nevada, and Pacific Northwest covering Washington, Oregon, Western Idaho, Southwestern British Columbia. The map books are usually arranged by county; for example, separate Thomas Guides have been published for Los Angeles County and San Diego County. There are also guides that will have two or three counties combined (for example, Los Angeles and Orange County), or guides that cover a metropolitan area (for instance, the San Francisco Bay Area). Each guide has a detailed index of streets and points of interest, as well as arterial maps for easy page location.

Thomas Guides were a local icon in Southern California for decades, with many companies including the Thomas Guide map grid information for their locations in Yellow Pages listings and other advertisements.

== History ==
=== 1915: Creation in Oakland, CA ===
Thomas Bros. Maps, the publishers of the Thomas Guide, previously known as Popular Street Atlas, Street Guide, and Popular Atlas, was started in Oakland, California, in 1915 by cartographer George Coupland Thomas and his two brothers, who were business partners. Early publications were detailed block maps, bird's eye view of communities, road & highway maps, and what would be generally referred as generalized tourist maps. Thomas Bros. also produced redlining maps of Los Angeles, Sacramento, San Francisco, San Jose, and the East Bay for the US government-sponsored Home Owners' Loan Corporation in the 1930s.

The company relocated its headquarters to Los Angeles in 1940. The company had grown to publish street maps of cities in several Western states; these maps were sold in fold-out, card stock covers. By the late 1940s, the company had added pocket-sized guidebooks of California and the city of San Francisco which included fold-out maps attached to the inner rear cover. The first street guides, which were initially pocket sized paperback booklets also began to appear at about this time, and were introduced for several counties in California, and one in Washington.

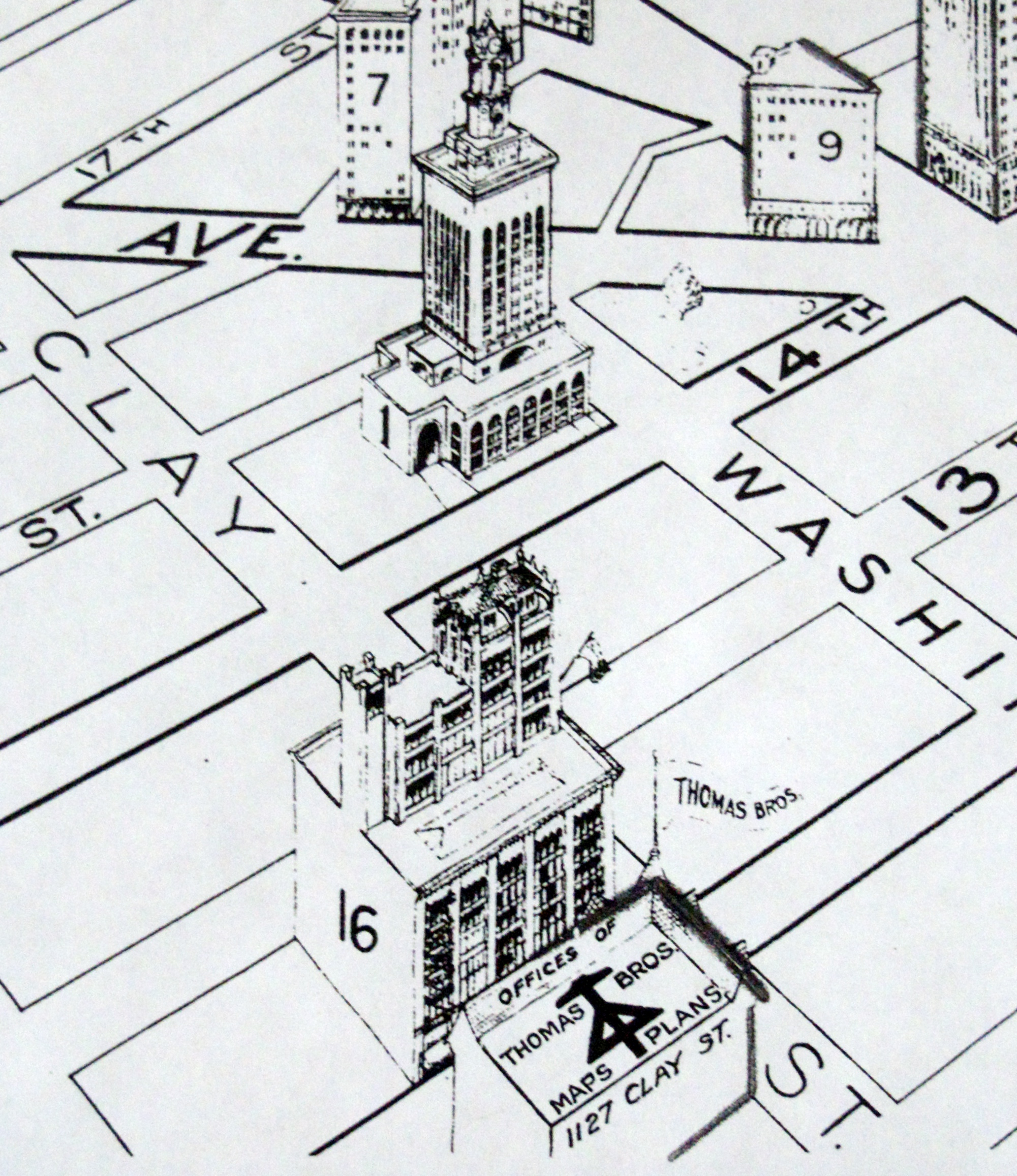
Thomas Bros. Oakland office in 1925

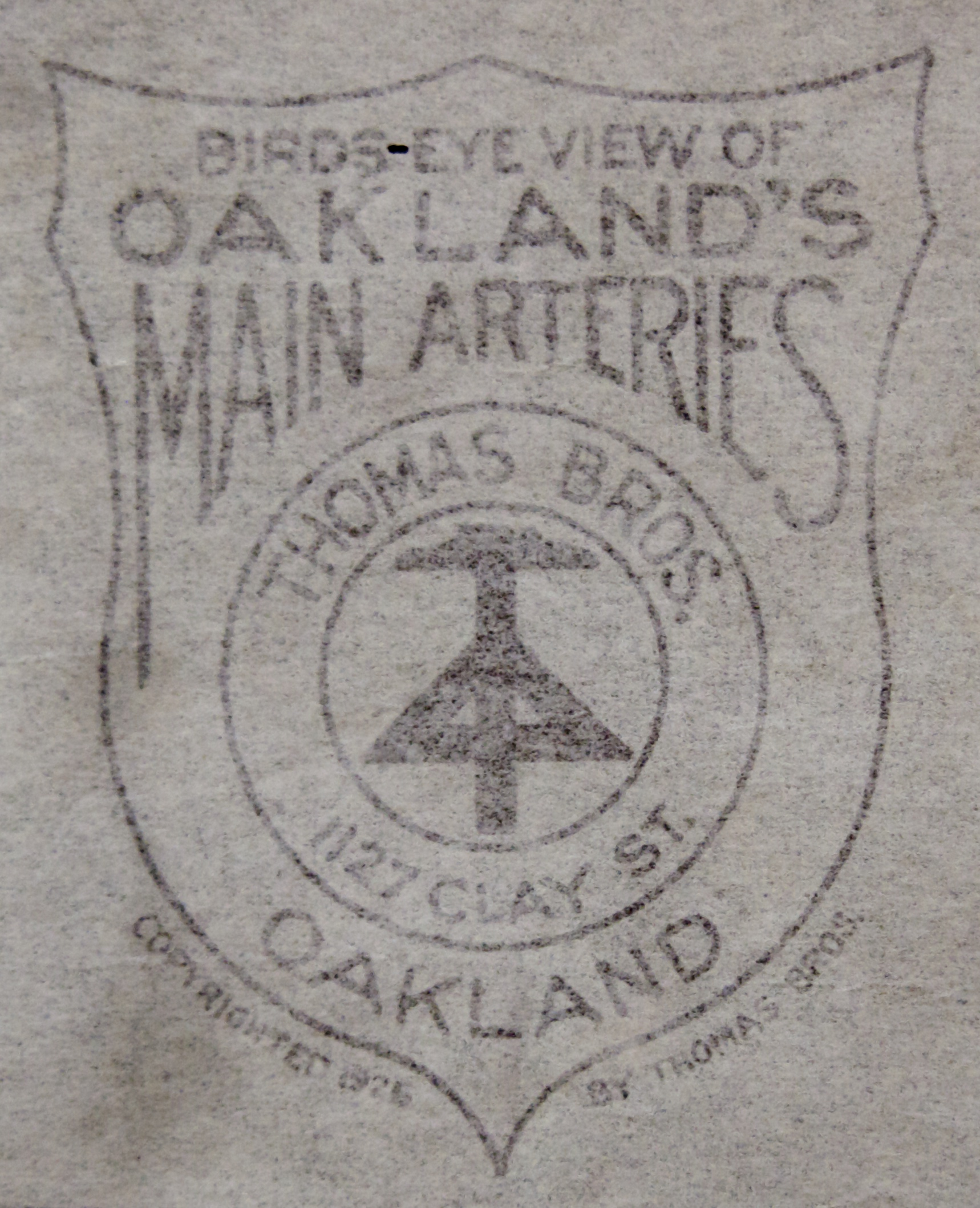
Thomas Bros. 1925 logo

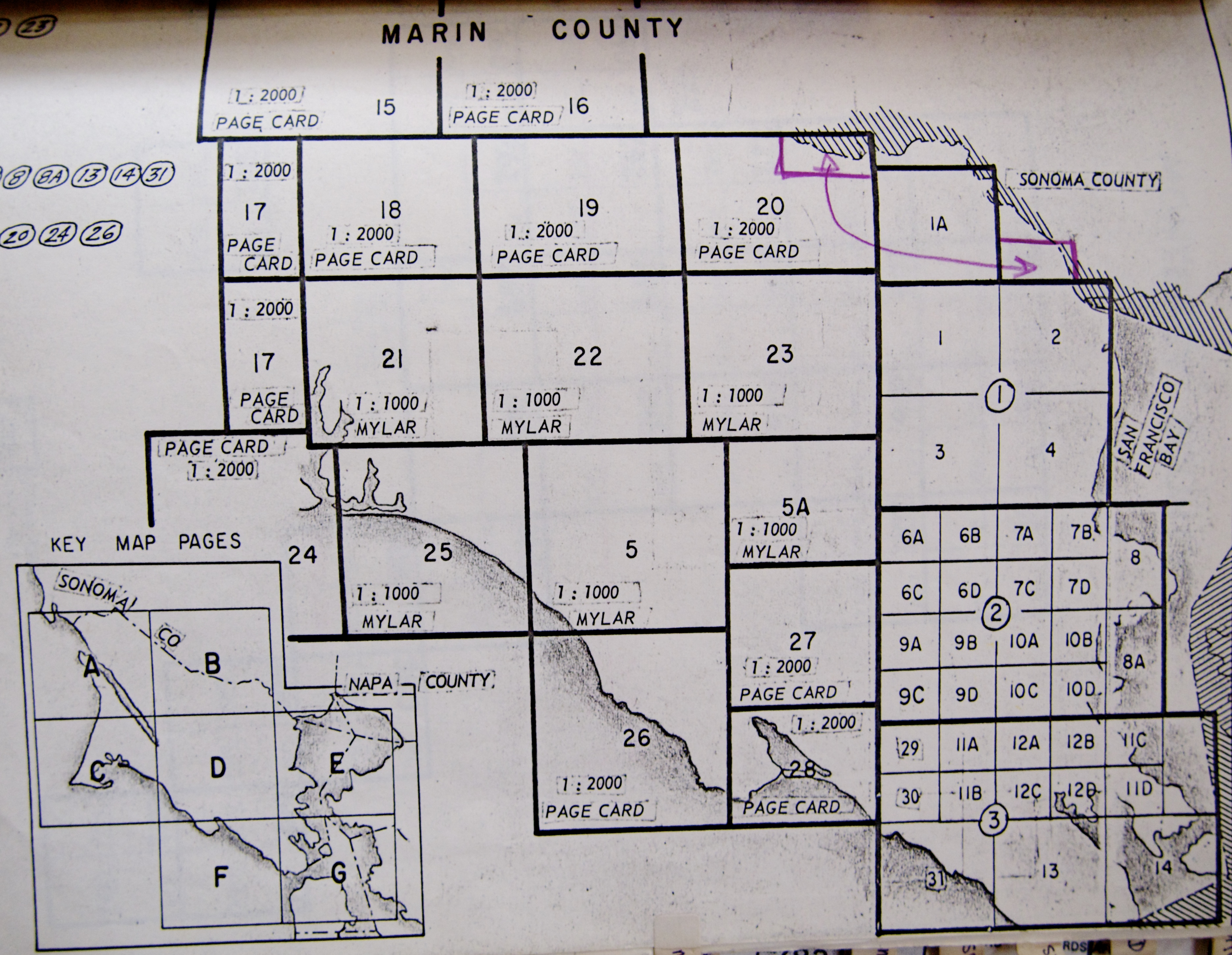
Marin County page alignment with various scales for street atlas

=== Acquisition by Warren B. Wilson; digital age ===
After George Coupland Thomas died in 1955, the company was acquired by Coupland Thomas's family lawyer Warren B. Wilson. Wilson's brother Lionel would later become mayor of Oakland.

During the California home development boom of the late 1970s, Wilson moved the company to a newly built state-of-the-art design building in an industrial park in Irvine, California, in early 1980. For 40 years, Wilson served as CEO and owner of Thomas Bros. Maps (TBM) and was responsible for leading the company into the digital age. Starting in the 1990s, Wilson hired many CEOs to run the company to give him more time for traveling and studying his love of art.

After conversion and completion of all of their pen and ink map atlases to digital format in the mid-1990s, map data became a significant part of TBM company sales. The company had large data contracts in the 1990s with the California Highway Patrol, large utilities, and many area cities and counties. The Thomas Brothers map database had a monopoly in the 1990s, since they had the best street address indexes in them, making them very good for address matching for businesses.

=== Acquisition by Rand McNally; decline ===
Because sales of its last produced guidebooks for Washington, D.C., and Virginia did not sell as expected and much money was lost on the website store design, the company was in major debt. The company also intended to expand in the East Coast, but failed to compete against existing mapmakers there. It was purchased by and became a wholly owned subsidiary of Rand McNally in 1999.

The company made radical changes in operation beginning in November 2003, and let go many of Thomas Brothers' most skilled cartographers and employees. The Rand McNally CEO announced all Irvine data edits would be outsourced to Bangalore, India. The remaining Irvine employees would send and manage the data to and from India and check the map work Indian editors did before publishing.

After January 2004, many things in the guides were cut to save money. The POI index was no longer updated. Thinner and cheaper paper was used in the map guides. The Irvine source department was closed and no customer corrections were taken or recorded. Many guides were no longer printed yearly. The book name was dropped to just Thomas Guide and colors changed to match Rand McNally colors and product line releases. The popular map store was closed at the Irvine building, which was the last TBM store to close as they had they shut the ones in San Francisco, downtown Los Angeles, and the South Coast Plaza Mall years earlier. The map guides still sell, but the famous digital map database is now outdated. Rand McNally now buys their map data and updates from companies like Tele Atlas and Navteq. They overlay the new streets on their old database for publication.

Rand McNally/TBM no longer has any employees or customer service in California, after laying off the final Irvine headquarters employees in 2009.

An updated Thomas Guide for Los Angeles and Orange Counties was published in 2021, three years after its previous update; it was updated again in 2025. The only other Thomas Guide regularly updated is for San Diego County (2022 edition, being updated in June 2026). Larry Thomas, majority owner of the Thomas Maps brand, noted that California state legislation required police and fire vehicles to carry Thomas Guides, though as of 2025 that was no longer the case, and that the brand sold 1,000 to 1,500 guides per year.

== Technical and technological development ==
From the early days until the late 1970s, draftsmen, not cartographers, annually compiled and updated maps. Maps were drawn in various scales and sizes. As communities infilled and expanded during the post-war period, this presented problems because the early base maps did not account for the Earth's curvature. Large wall maps were mosaics of smaller units making street alignment interesting. Easter-egg, or deliberate errors, were included on maps to help protect copyrights. These bugs usually were lakes, parks, or other fictitious landmarks; fictitious streets ("trap streets") were avoided due to extensive use by emergency services.

During a period of expansion in the early 1990s, the company established a map education foundation that trained teachers and donated geographical materials to local schools. It also developed a digital map database utilizing a check-out system for cartographers to update and version-control live maps. Additionally, the company created a digital map page and grid look-up system covering global coordinates.

== Products ==
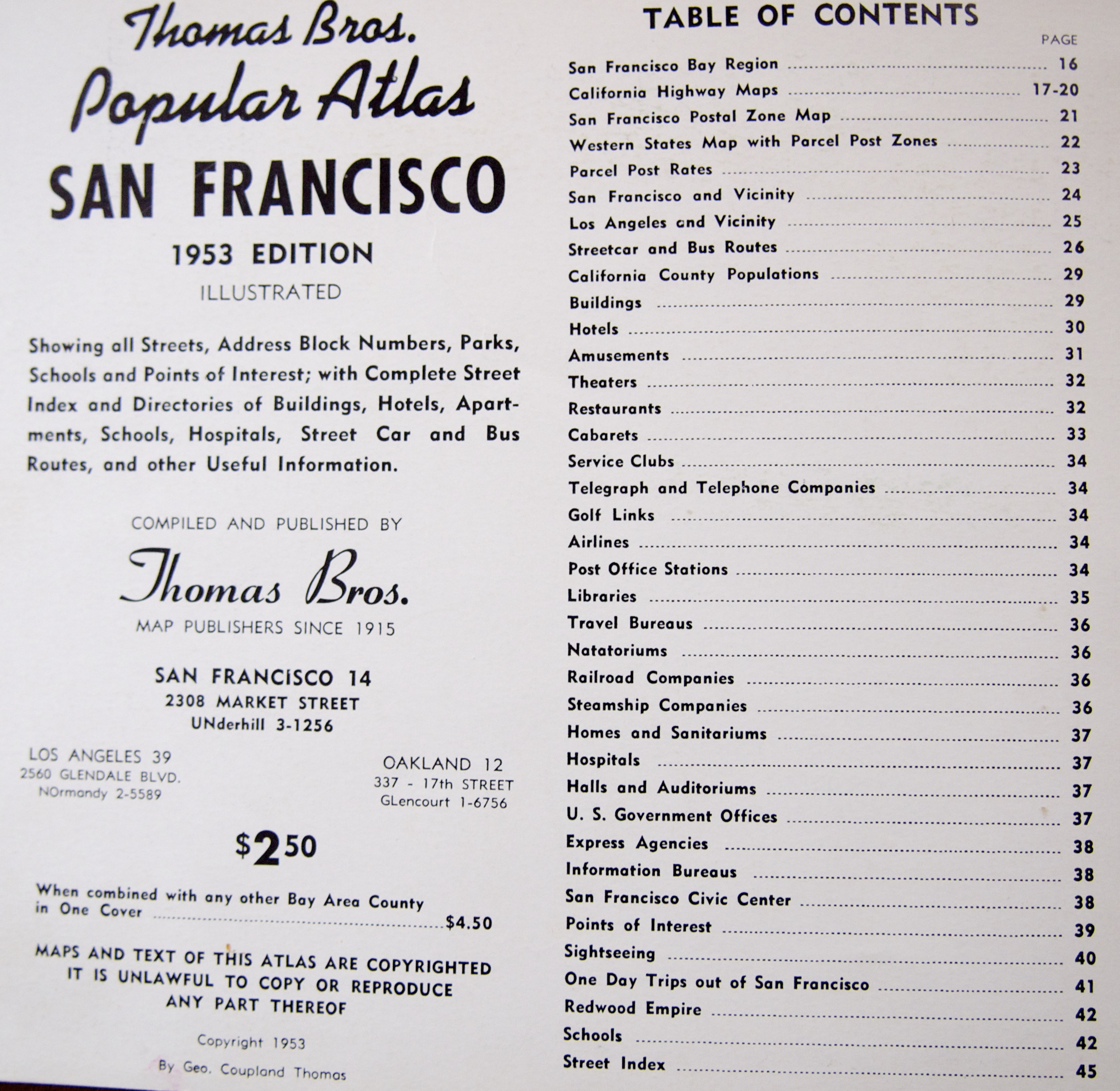
Thomas Bros. 1953 Street Guide title page

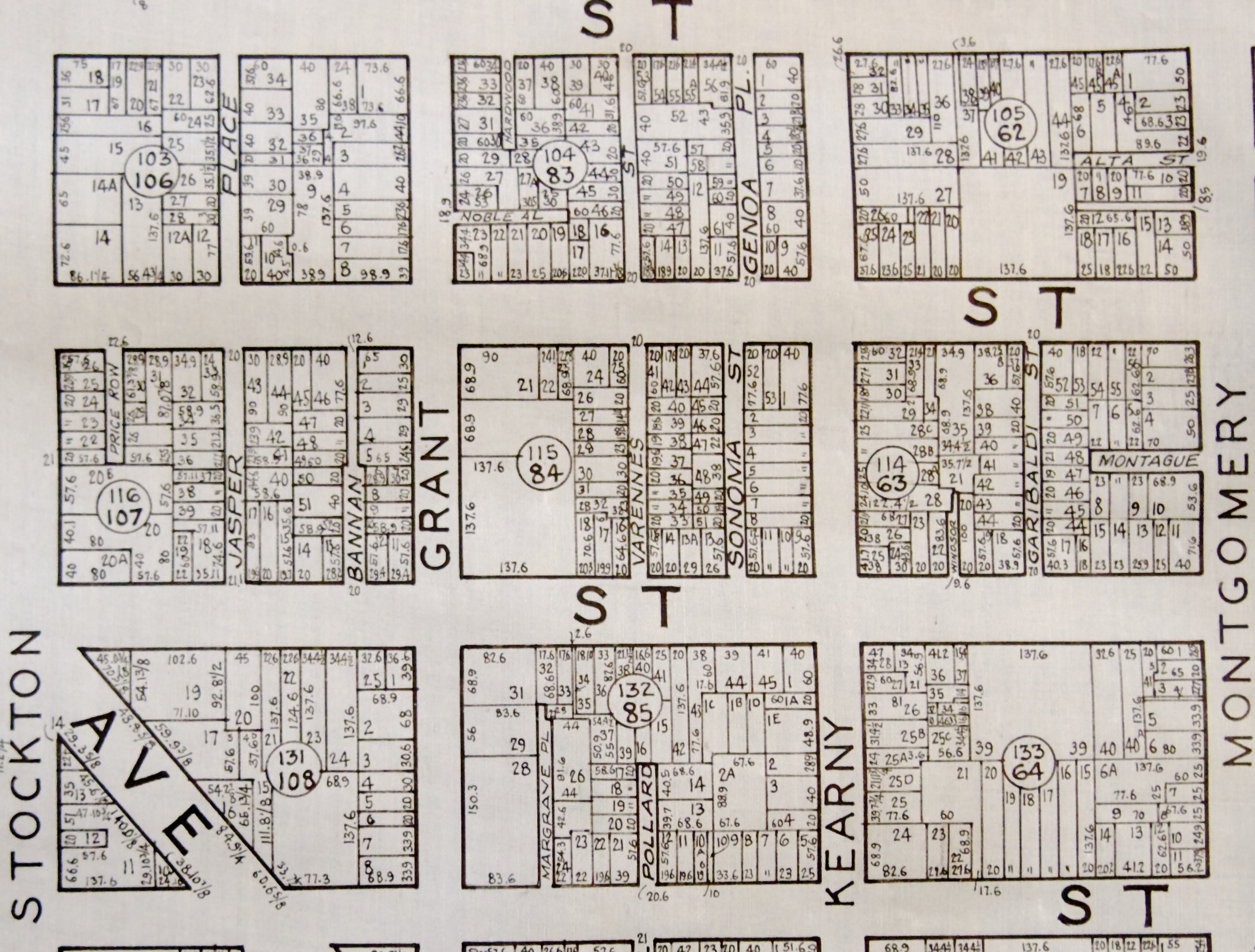
San Francisco Fifty Vara (Business District) Block Detail

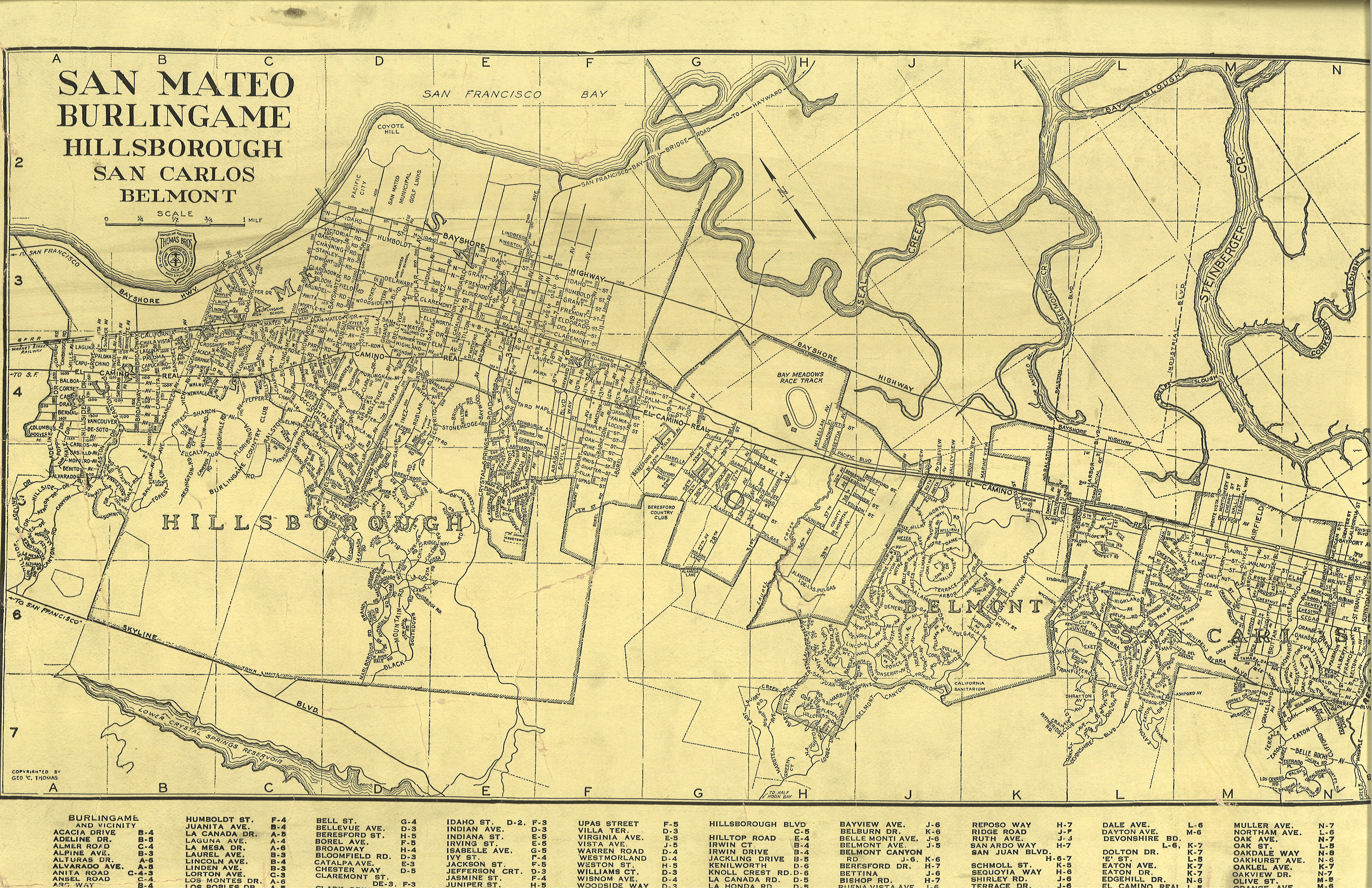
Early wall map featuring San Mateo in 1938

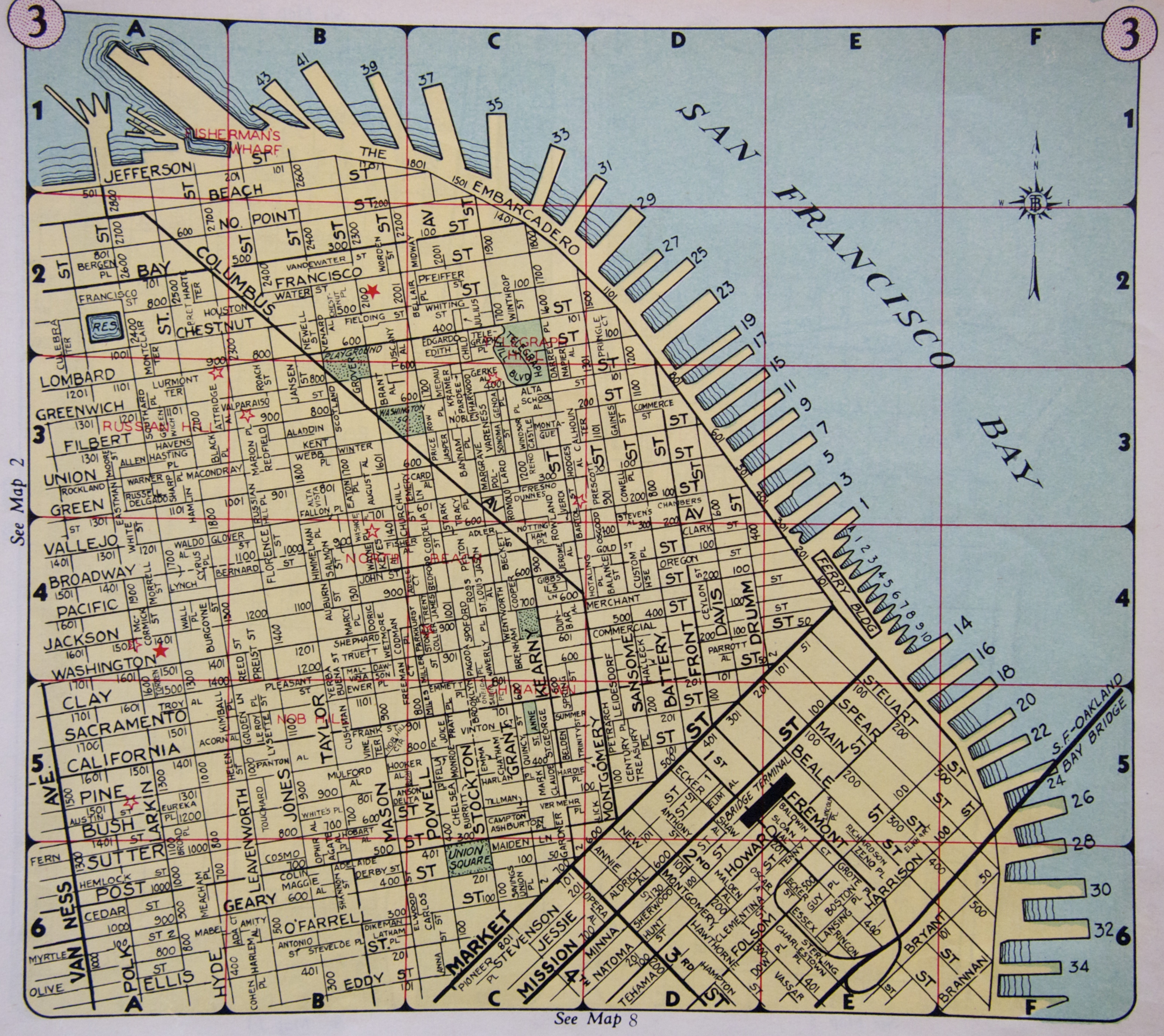
Thomas Bros. 1953 San Francisco Popular Street Atlas page

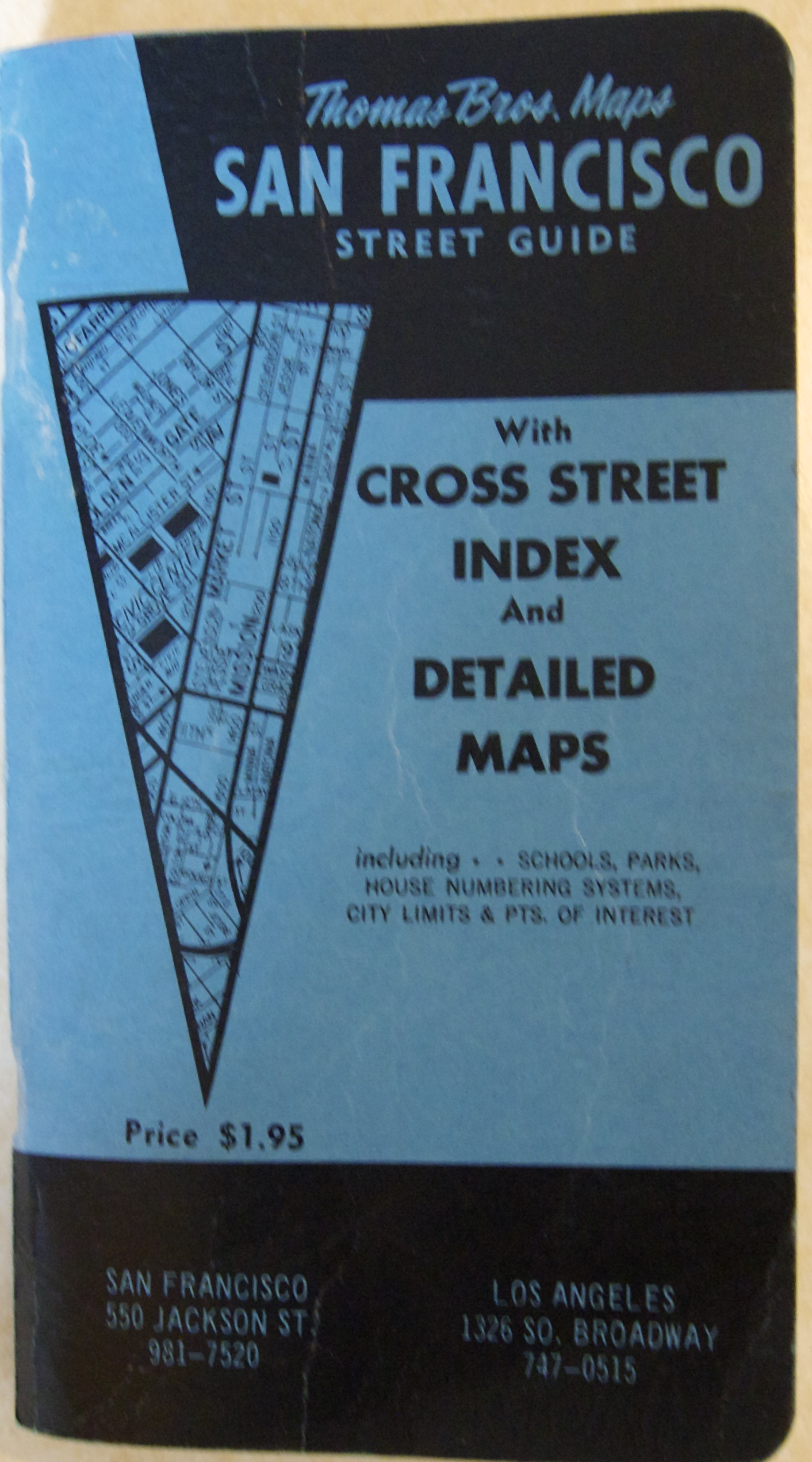
Thomas Bros. Maps Street Guide for San Francisco

Thomas Guide atlases are sometimes referred to as a Thomas Brothers (for Thomas Bros. Maps). However, "Thomas Guides" are so commonly used in Southern California that governments, businesses, individuals and even emergency response agencies will often refer to a "Thomas Guide" page number and map grid to help specify a location.

Businesses often use the large Thomas Guide wall maps. One common use for the wall maps is for delivery businesses, such as a local pizza restaurant. In addition, custom versions of the guides and wall maps are produced for businesses and governments that include such things as census tracts, locations of government facilities, watershed boundaries, and political boundaries.

There are also CD-ROM digital editions of the Thomas Guide atlases available (Microsoft Windows only). In addition, the Thomas Brothers digital database can be licensed to companies and governments to use as a base map for geographical information systems applications.

Updated editions are released annually, although according to interviews with former employees responsible for product updates, actual map content for some titles is updated only every other year. (Product covers are updated every year, even if map content has not changed.) Folding map products are created as a derivative of the Thomas Guides, which carry the Rand McNally name, but mention that the content is from the Thomas Guides. Rand McNally also releases Thomas Guide-like Street Guides and traditional fold-out versions of maps covering regions of North America not covered by the Thomas Guides.

A wide variety of products were produced for sales planning, dispatching, routing, real estate listings and territorial assignments. Besides the regular annual street atlases, they also produced wall maps, Zip Code guides, Rock Products Zones, and Census Tract editions.

Popular Street Atlases (counties):

- Alameda, CA – first edition 1953
- Anne Arundel, MD – first edition 1998
- Baltimore Metropolitan Area, MD – first edition 1999
- Boise, ID – first edition 2007
- Central Valley Cities, CA – first edition 1987
- Clark, NV – first edition 1999
- Contra Costa, CA – first edition 1953
- Frederick, MD – first edition 1999
- Fredericksburg Area, VA – first edition 1999
- Fresno, CA – first edition 1978
- Golden Gate (Marin, San Francisco, San Mateo, Santa Clara) – first edition 1961
- Howard, MD – first edition 1998
- Kern, CA – first edition 1980
- King, WA – first edition 1955
- Kitsap, WA – first edition 2008
- Los Angeles, CA – first edition 1946
- Loudoun, VA – first edition 1998
- Marin, CA – first edition 1953
- Monterey, CA – first edition 1977
- Napa-Solano-Yolo, CA – first edition 1981
- Orange, CA – first edition 1953
- Phoenix (Maricopa), AZ – first edition 1977
- Pierce, WA – first edition 1966
- Portland Metropolitan Area, OR & WA – first edition 1978
- Prince William, VA – first edition 1998
- Riverside, CA – first edition 1964
- Sacramento, CA – first edition 1960
- Salem, OR – first edition 2008
- San Bernardino, CA – first edition 1964
- San Diego, CA – first edition 1951
- San Francisco, CA – first edition 1953
- San Mateo, CA – first edition 1953
- Santa Barbara, CA – first edition 1972
- Santa Clara, CA – first edition 1953
- Snohomish, WA – first edition 1956
- Sonoma, CA – first edition 1953
- Tucson (Pima), AZ – first edition 2001
- Ventura, CA – first edition 1965
- Washington DC Metropolitan Area, DC – first edition 1998

Street Guides (counties):

- Alameda, CA
- Contra Costa, CA
- Los Angeles, CA
- Marin, CA
- Orange, CA
- San Francisco, CA
- San Mateo, CA
- Santa Clara, CA

In 2011, it was reported that two hundred copies are stored at the Central Library in downtown Los Angeles, managed by map librarian Glen Creason. As of 2025 Creason's successor, Peter Hauge, maintained the collection.

== See also ==
- Geographers' A–Z Street Atlas
