= George Amos Poole III =

American printer (1907–1990)

George Amos Poole, III
- Born: George Amos Poole, III; April 8, 1907
- Died: March 21, 1990 (aged 82)
- Education: University of Chicago; Yale University
- Occupations: Printer, Business Executive, Philanthropist, University of Chicago Trustee
- Parent: George Amos Poole, II

George Amos Poole III (8 April 1907 – 21 March 1990) was an American printer who formed an important collection of manuscripts and examples of early printing that was acquired by David A. Randall for the Lilly Library at Indiana University.

Poole attended the University of Chicago and Yale University and went on to direct the Chicago printers Poole Brothers. He was a trustee of the Newberry Library and the University of Chicago. He married Ellen Stuart on 20 September 1930.
