= Rand McNally =

American publishing company

- Type: Private
- Industry: Atlases, Maps, Education Materials, MileMaker Routing Software, Consumer Electronics, Commercial Transportation
- Founded: 1856; 170 years ago in Chicago, Illinois, United States
- Founders: William H. Rand; Andrew McNally; George Amos Poole, I
- Headquarters: Rosemont, Illinois, United States
- Key people: Joseph W. Roark, Chairman
- Products: Maps, atlases, software
- Owner: TELEO Capital
- Website: randmcnally.com

Rand McNally is an American technology and publishing company that produces atlases, maps, educational materials, truck routing software (MileMaker) and telematics (GPS mapping software and hardware, electronic logging devices, asset trackers, tablets, brake monitoring systems (Safety Direct) and a data platform) for commercial transportation. The company is headquartered in Rosemont, Illinois, with a distribution center in Richmond, Kentucky and offices in Portugal and Australia.

== History ==
=== Early history ===
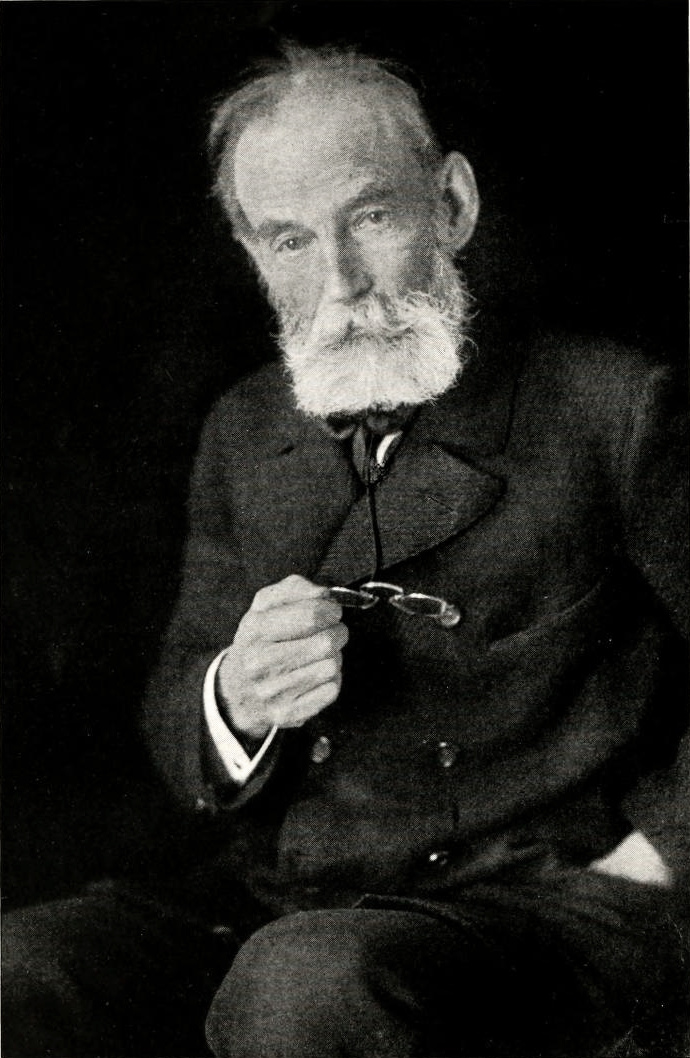
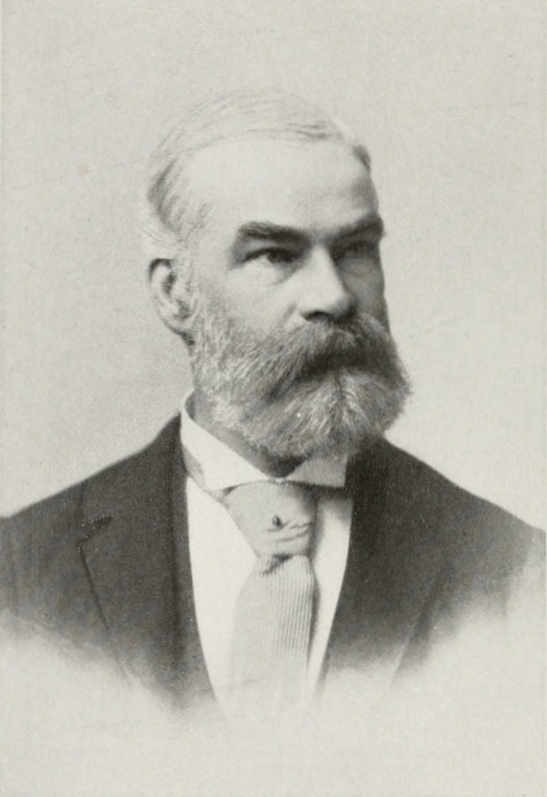
Founders William H. Rand (above) and Andrew McNally (below)

In 1856, William H. Rand opened a printing shop in Chicago and two years later hired a newly arrived Irish immigrant, Andrew McNally, to work in his shop. The shop did big business with the forerunner of the Chicago Tribune, and in 1859 Rand and McNally were hired to run the Tribune's entire printing operation. In 1868, the two men, along with Rand's nephew George Amos Poole, established Rand McNally & Co. and bought the Tribune's printing business. The company initially focused on printing tickets and timetables for Chicago's booming railroad industry, and the following year supplemented that business by publishing complete railroad guides. In 1870, the company expanded into printing business directories and an illustrated newspaper. According to company lore, during the Great Chicago Fire in 1871, Rand McNally quickly had two of the company's printing machines buried in a sandy beach of Lake Michigan, and the company was up and running again only a few days later.

The first Rand McNally map, created using a new cost-saving wax engraving method, appeared in the December 1872 edition of its Railroad Guide. Rand McNally became an incorporated business in 1873; with Rand as its president, McNally as vice president, and George Poole as treasurer. The Business Atlas, containing maps and data pertinent to business planning, was first published in 1876. The atlas is still updated today, now titled the Commercial Atlas & Marketing Guide. The Trade Book department was established in 1877, publishing such titles as The Locust Plague in the United States. Rand McNally began publishing educational maps in 1880 with its first line of maps, globes, and geography textbooks, soon followed by a world atlas. The company began publishing general literature in 1884 with its first title, The Secret of Success, and the Textbook department was established in 1894 with The Rand McNally Primary School Geography. Also in 1894, the company opened an office in New York City headed by Caleb S. Hammond, who later started his own map company, C. S. Hammond & Co.

Rand McNally published its first road map, the New Automobile Road Map of New York City & Vicinity, in 1904. In 1907, the company acquired the line of Photo-Auto Guides from G.S. Chapin, which provided photographs of routes and intersections with directions. Andrew McNally II (son of Frederick McNally) personally took photos on his honeymoon for the Chicago-to-Milwaukee edition. The company continued to expand its book publishing business, with best-selling children's books such as The Real Mother Goose in 1916 and Kon-Tiki in 1950.

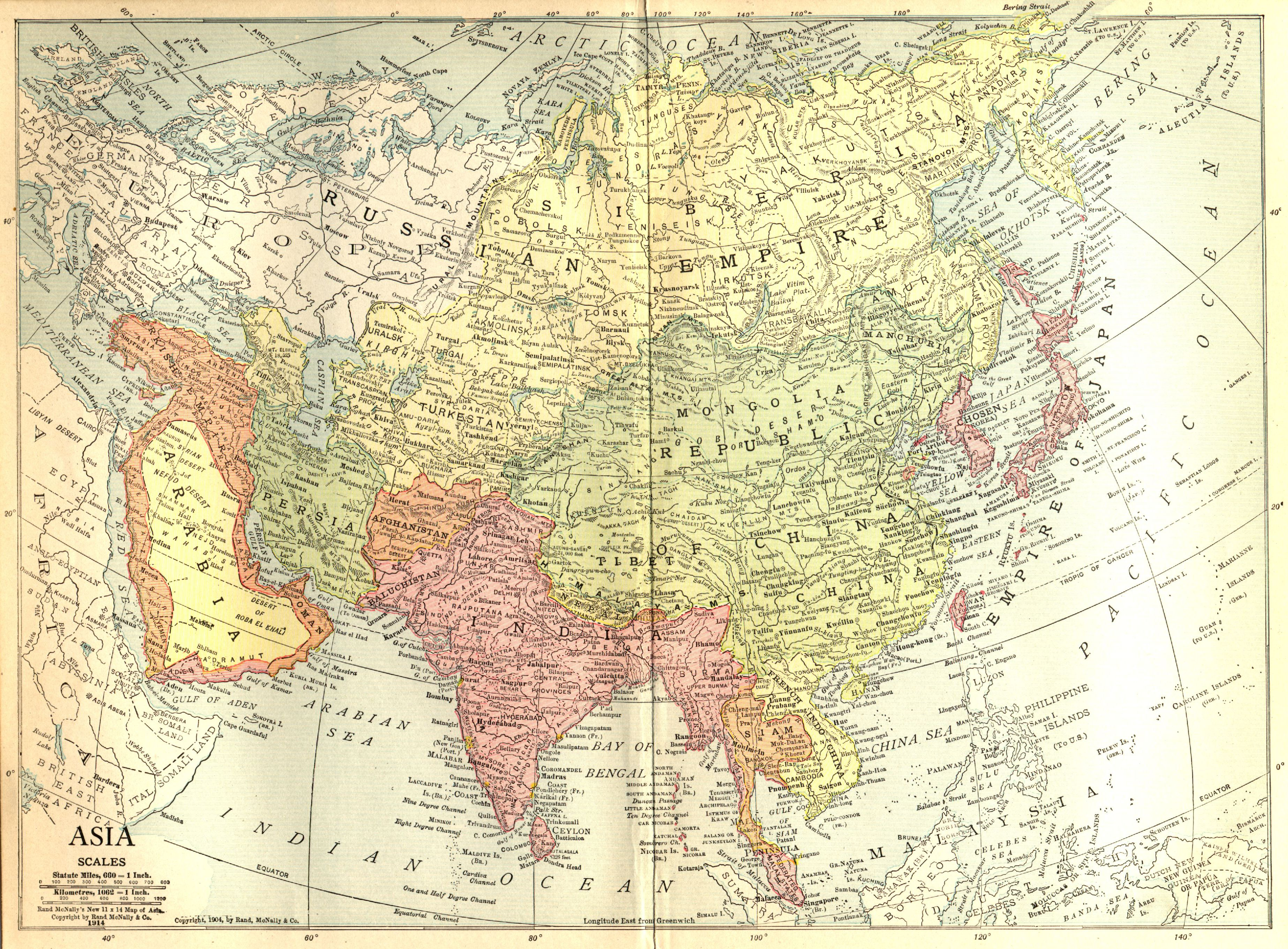
A Rand McNally map appended to the 1914 edition of The New Student's Reference Work

Rand McNally was the first major map publisher to embrace a system of numbered highways. One of its cartographers, John Brink, invented a system that was first published in 1917 on a map of Peoria, Illinois. In addition to creating maps with numbered roads, Rand McNally also erected many of the actual roadside highway signs. This system was subsequently adopted by state and federal highway authorities. The oil industry quickly developed an interest in road maps, enticing Americans to explore and consume more gasoline. In 1920, Rand McNally began publishing road maps for the Gulf Oil Company, to be freely distributed at its service stations. By 1930, Rand McNally had two major road map competitors, General Drafting and Gousha, the latter of which was founded by a former Rand McNally sales representative. The Rand McNally Auto Chum, later to become the ubiquitous Rand McNally Road Atlas, debuted in 1924. The first full-color edition was published in 1960 and in 1995, it became fully digitized.

=== Later history ===
The Goode's School Atlas, named for its first editor, Dr. J. Paul Goode, was published in 1923. It became a standard text for high school and college geography curricula. Later retitled Goode's World Atlas, it is now in its 23rd edition. The first Rand McNally Travel Store was opened in New York City in 1937. In the 1990s it became a chain with 29 locations, but by 2005 all were closed as a cost-saving measure.

Rand McNally moved its headquarters from Chicago to suburban Skokie, Illinois in 1952. The company opened its Versailles, Kentucky, book publishing plant in 1962 with 300,000 square feet (28,000 m^{2}) and 23 employees. In 1994, the plant was the first to implement a new Kodak computer-to-plate printing system. When the plant was sold in 1997, it was over 1,000,000 square feet (93,000 m^{2}) and employed 1,255 people.

In 1961, because the company was not satisfied with the ability of existing map projections to create intuitive depictions of the entire world, it commissioned Dr. Arthur H. Robinson to develop what became known as the Robinson projection, which became very popular and was used extensively for constructing maps of the entire world. Rand McNally began creating maps digitally in 1982.

In 1980, Rand McNally sold its educational publishing operations to Houghton Mifflin.

In 1989, Rand McNally donated its extensive collection of maps to the Newberry Library. Now in possession of Gousha's archives as well, Rand McNally donated that map archive to the Newberry in late 2002.

With a string of acquisitions and growth throughout the 1980s and 1990s, Rand McNally employed over 4,000 people in four business groups. The company had been majority-owned by the McNally family since 1899, but by 1997 the family had decided to divest its interest.

In late September 2018, Rand McNally moved its headquarters to Rosemont, IL, after more than 60 years in suburban Skokie, Illinois. Higgins Road was chosen as the location for the new site.

== Ownership ==
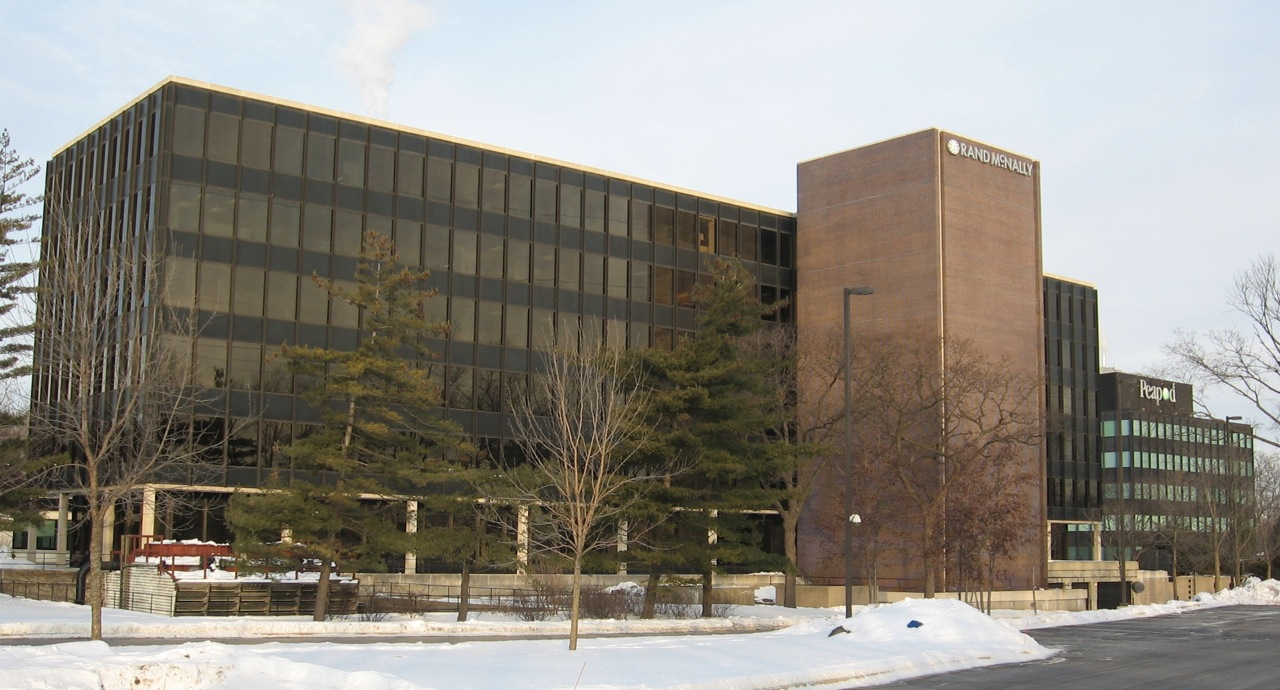
Rand McNally's former corporate headquarters in Skokie, Illinois

Rand McNally has always been a privately held company, with stock held by very few parties and very thinly traded. When Rand retired in 1899, he sold his shares in the company to McNally and the other company officers. The McNally family was the majority owner for nearly 100 years, from 1899 until 1997, at which time the family decided to divest its majority stake. The company was sold piecemeal; in January 1997, the company announced it was selling its Book Services Group, which employed 1,700 people in Versailles, Kentucky, and Taunton, Massachusetts, to World Color Press for $155 million. In February 1997, the DocuSystems Group, which printed airline tickets and luggage tags at its Nashville facility, was sold to Code Hennessy & Simmons, a Chicago-based private equity firm. In April 1997, the Media Services Group, which employed 350 people with offices in Nashville, Tennessee; Fremont, California; Shannon, Ireland; and the Asia-Pacific region, was sold to McQueen Ltd., a Scottish software company.

The sole remaining group, publishing, represented the core mapmaking business of the company. In November 1997, the McNally family completed its divestiture by selling its majority ownership to AEA Investors for a reported $500 million. Much of the purchase price was leveraged, meaning the company took on significant debt hedging on future earnings. AEA intended to capitalize on Rand McNally's brand recognition by bringing digital mapping to the masses and attracting public investors during the dot-com boom. However, the company fell behind the technology curve of upstarts such as MapQuest and fell further into debt. AEA's stake in the company was acquired by Leonard Green & Partners through a prepackaged Chapter 11 restructuring deal on January 15, 2003. In December 2007, Patriarch Partners, which had previously been a minority owner, bought shares owned by Leonard Green and other minority owners to become the sole owner of Rand McNally. In 2020, Teleo Capital purchased Rand McNally as sole owner.

== Facilities ==
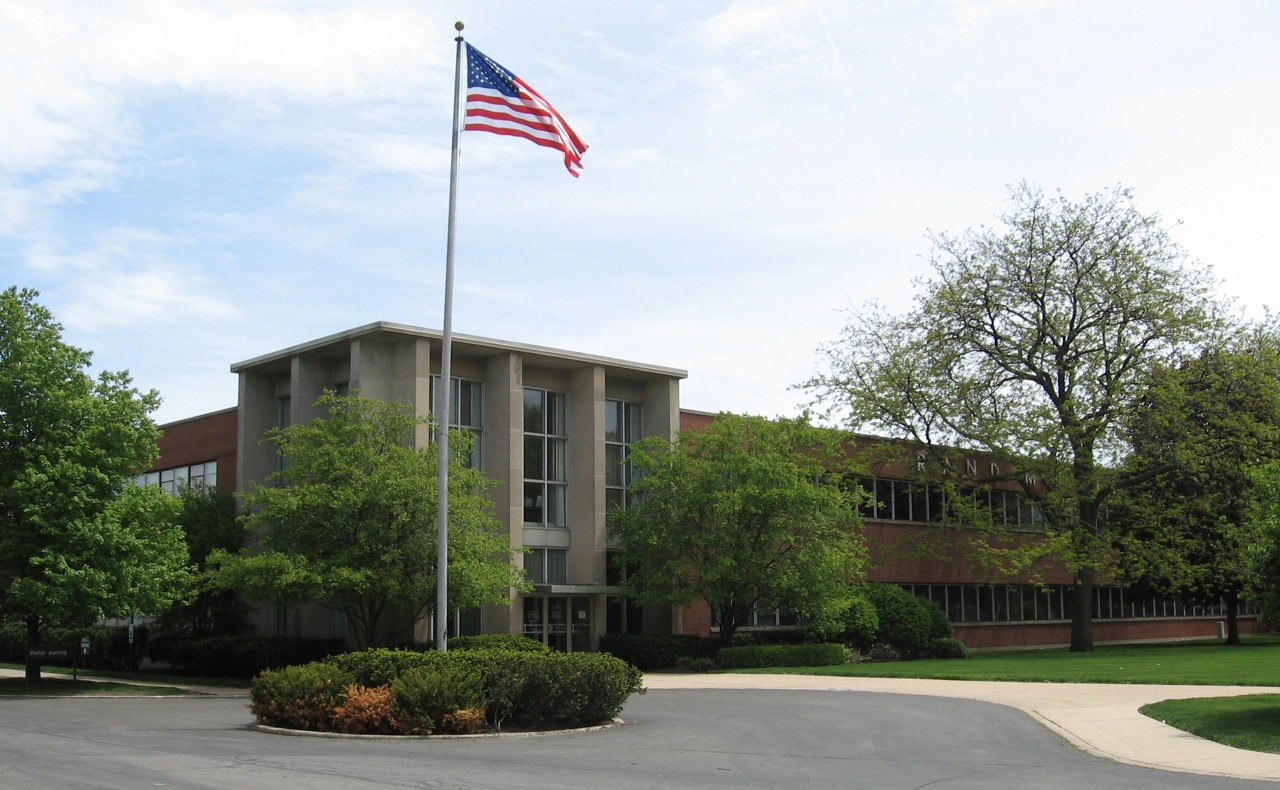
Rand McNally's former corporate headquarters in Skokie. The building was sold to Ida Crown Jewish Academy.

Rand McNally had been headquartered in the Chicago metropolitan area since its inception. Its 1899 headquarters on West Adams Street was the world's first all-steel-framed skyscraper.

By the 1950s, its Chicago area workforce had grown to over 1,000 employees and larger facilities were needed. In 1952, it opened a new 283,008 sq ft (26,292 m^{2}) building in suburban Skokie, bringing corporate offices, printing, and distribution operations under one roof. Over the ensuing decades, however, printing and distribution operations relocated, eventually resulting in the underutilization of the aging Skokie building. It was sold in February 2008 to Ida Crown Jewish Academy for $11 million, and the approximately 200 current employees relocated in January 2009 to an office building near Skokie's Old Orchard Mall. As of April 26, 2024, Rand McNally no longer has a physical address in the Chicagoland area after a round of layoffs following a merger with Safety Direct.

The Irvine, California, facilities from the acquisition of Thomas Bros. Maps in 1997 closed in 2010.

Rand McNally sold its Canadian subsidiary, located in Markham, Ontario, on June 30, 2008, to the newly formed Canadian Cartographics Corporation.

== Presidents and CEOs ==
William Rand founded his print shop in 1856 and Rand, McNally & Co. was formally established in 1868. The company was incorporated in 1873 with Rand as the first president and McNally vice-president. When Rand retired in 1899, Andrew McNally assumed the role of president until his death in 1904. Andrew's son, Frederick McNally, became president upon his father's death, just as the age of the automobile was beginning. When Frederick McNally died in 1907, his sister's husband, Harry Beach Clow, became president. Andrew McNally II took over in 1933. He and his heirs, Andrew McNally III and IV, successively served as president until 1993.

1. 1873–1899: William Rand
2. 1899–1904: Andrew McNally
3. 1904–1907: Frederick McNally (Andrew's son)
4. 1907–1933: Harry Beach Clow (Andrew's son-in-law)
5. 1933–1948: Andrew McNally II (Andrew's grandson)
6. 1948–1974: Andrew McNally III (Andrew's great-grandson)
7. 1974–1993: Andrew McNally IV (Andrew's great-great-grandson)
8. 1993–1997: John S. Bakalar (former Rand McNally CFO)
9. 1997–1999: Henry J. Feinberg (former head of Rand McNally Publishing Group)
10. 1999–2000: Richard J. Davis (former executive at RR Donnelley and GeoSystems, forerunners of MapQuest)
11. 2000–2001: Norman E. Wells Jr. (former Rand McNally COO)
12. 2001–2003: Michael Hehir (former head of McGraw-Hill Ventures)
13. 2003–2008: Robert S. Apatoff (former head of Allstate marketing)
14. 2008–2009: Andrzej Wrobel (Patriarch Partners IT Platform Managing Director)
15. 2009–Nov 2013: Dave Muscatel
16. Dec 2013–Nov 2020: Stephen Fletcher
17. Nov 2020–Present: Joseph Roark, TELEO Capital Operating Partner, chairman, Interim CEO through June 2021
18. June 2021 – Jan 2023 Aaron Dannenbring

== Acquisitions ==
Rand McNally has made many acquisitions over the years to consolidate the crowded map publishing industry or to extend its capabilities in new markets.

- 1980 – Transportation Data Management (TDM) – Makers of transportation mileage and routing software that continues to be used for Rand's commercial trucking products.
- 1984 – Denoyer-Geppert – Assets of the school map and globe publisher were assimilated into Rand's education product line.
- 1988 – Champion Map – Rand continued to use its facilities in Daytona Beach, Florida, until 2001. All Champion Map products had disappeared, but in 2007 Rand began using the brand on street maps for selected small markets.
- 1992 – Nicholstone Holdings – Subsidiary companies (Nicholstone Software Services, Nicholstone Looseleaf, and Nicholstone Bindery) were folded into Rand's Book Services Group, extending its printing and binding businesses and adding capabilities for manufacturing, packaging, and distributing computer software and documentation.
- 1993 – Allmaps Canada – Became a wholly owned subsidiary company, Rand McNally Canada, and was subsequently sold to Canadian Cartographics Corporation in 2008. Under contract from Rand McNally, CCC will continue to create Canadian products under the Rand McNally name and distribute U.S. products to the Canadian market.
- 1996 – Gousha – One of Rand McNally's longtime rivals, its 82 employees unexpectedly found their Comfort, Texas, building locked on the morning of April 18 with a note taped to the door stating that the company had been purchased by Rand McNally and all their jobs had been eliminated. Gousha's entire product line was discontinued.
- 1998 – Thomas Bros. Maps – The prominent Southern California mapmaker best known for its ubiquitous Thomas Guide. Rand McNally continues to brand its street guide products as "The Thomas Guide" in western U.S. markets.
- 1999 – King of the Road – Regional map publisher and distributor based in the Pacific Northwest, which had a previous partnership with Thomas Bros. King of the Road titles are no longer available.
- 2004 – Perly's – Maker of street maps for Toronto, Ontario and the surrounding areas; sold as part of Rand McNally Canada in 2008.
- 2022 - Fleetsu - Fleet management and vehicle insights start-up.

== Moonmap ==
Rand McNally's greenish colored map of the moon's near side contains several names for surface formations which were not accepted by the International Astronomical Union (IAU). Rand McNally's moonmap also appeared in Patrick Moore's Atlas of the Universe (1970 / 1983). The names which were not accepted by the IAU are:

*Andreus Hills, north of Mare Humorum, east of Gassendi.

*Golubiz Cluster, between Campanus and Kies, at the most southwestern section of Mare Nubium. The name Golubiz Cluster was not included on the moonmap in Patrick Moore's Atlas of the Universe (1983).

*Leon Hills, north of crater Wichmann in Oceanus Procellarum.

*Loró Basin, westsouthwest of Airy and southeast of satellite crater Parrot G, contains a swirl pattern which is observable during full moon.

*Lothrop Hills, southwest of Euler at the southwestern section of Mare Imbrium, also called The Euler Group.

*Mishqui Basin, south of Mare Crisium.

*Mitika Peak, southwest of Cajal in Mare Tranquillitatis.

*Morotcha, at the northern rim of Mare Vaporum.

== See also ==
- Ranally city rating system
- Poole Bros.
- Street Finder
