= Outline of transportation planning =

The following outline is provided as an overview of and topical guide to transportation planning.

Transportation planning – process of defining future policies, goals, investments, and spatial planning designs to prepare for future needs to move people and goods to destinations.

== Context ==
- Built environment
- Urban planning
- Land-use

== Tools and inputs ==
- 3D city model
- Accessibility (transport)
- Benefit-cost ratio
- City-building game
- Generalised cost
- Hierarchy of roads
- Isochrone map
- Land-use forecasting
- Local transport plan
- New Approach to Appraisal
- Permeability (spatial and transport planning)
- SmartCode
- Traffic simulation
- Transport economics
- Transport engineering
- Transport forecasting
- Travel behavior
- Trip generation
- Trip distribution
- Mode choice
- Route assignment

== Purpose and implementation ==
- Automobile dependency
- Bicycle poverty reduction
- Bus lane
- Curb extension
- Cycling advocacy
- Home zone / Play Street
- Journey to work
- Modal shift
- Shared space
- Street hierarchy
- Student transport
- Traffic flow
- Urban resilience

=== Theories ===
- Braess's paradox
- Lewis-Mogridge position

=== Sustainable transport ===
- Complete streets
- Freeway removal
- Green transport hierarchy
- Road diet
- Road expansion
- Highway revolt
- Transit-oriented development
- Transit mall
- Living street
- Low emission zone
  - Clean Air Zone
  - Ultra Low Emission Zone
  - Zero-emission zone
- Zürich model

==== Cycling infrastructure ====
- Cycling infrastructure
  - Bike freeway
  - Cycle lane

== Outcomes and impacts ==
- Gridlock
- Induced demand
- Traffic congestion
- Transit desert
- Transport divide
- Travel blending
- Travel plan

=== Social ===
- Active mobility
- Health impact of light rail systems
- Obesity and walking

== Measurements of planning outcomes ==
- Available seat miles
- Crush load
- Cycling mobility
- Passenger load factor
- Passengers per hour per direction
- Patronage (transportation)
- Public transport accessibility level
- Route capacity
- Units of transportation measurement
- Walkability

== Notable publications and government reports ==
- The Death and Life of Great American Cities
- Roads for Prosperity
- Sustainable Development Goal 11
- Traffic in Towns
- A New Deal for Transport: Better for everyone

== People ==
- Siân Berry
- Ernest Marples
- Robert Moses
- Sam Schwartz
- Jarrett Walker
- John Whitelegg
- Christian Wolmar

== Organizations ==
- Automobile association
- Motor club
- Pedestrian's Association
- Sustrans
- Transport planning professional (UK)

== See also ==
- Outline of transport
