= Cost of poverty =

Poor people often incur higher expenses due to lack of options

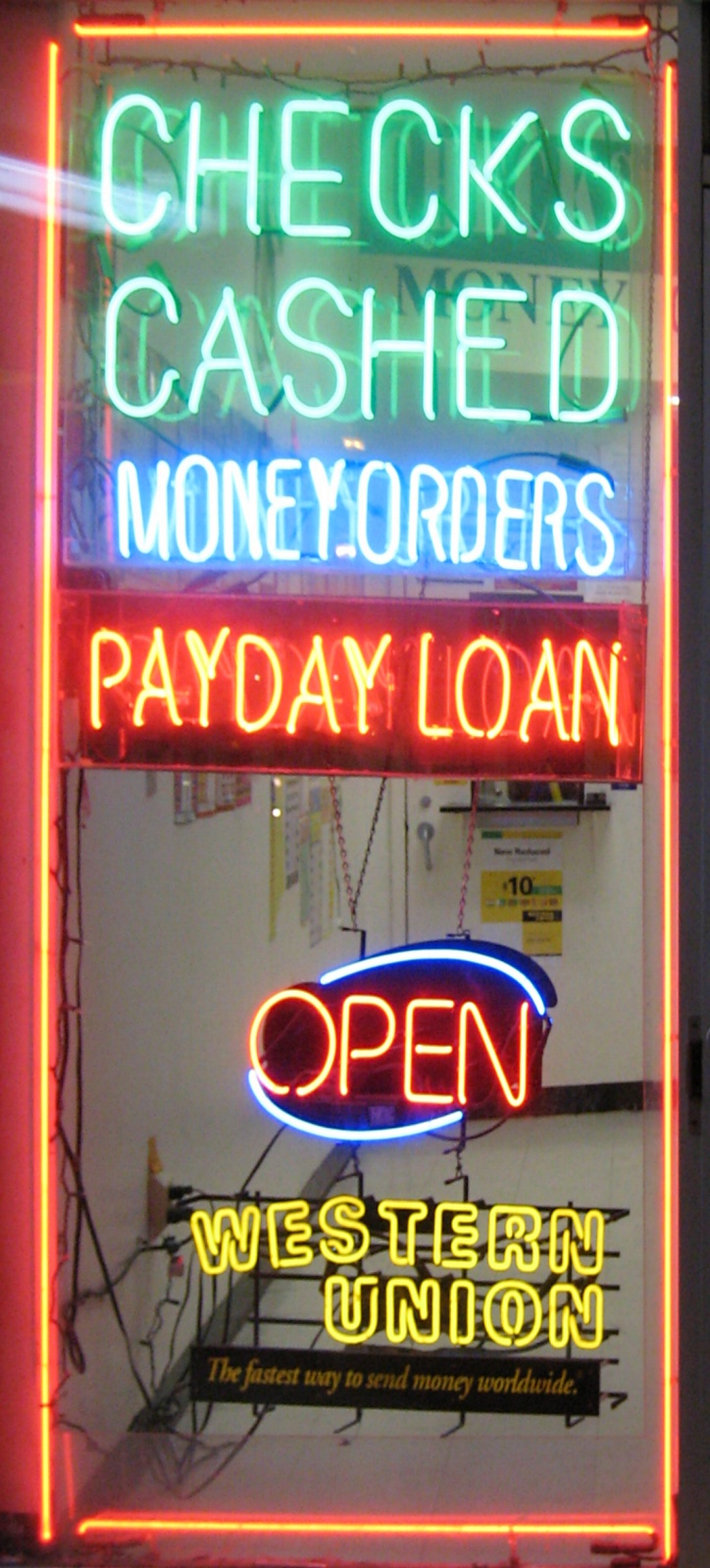
Payday lenders, which typically charge high interest rates, are more common in lower-income neighborhoods

A cost of poverty, also known as a ghetto tax, a poverty premium, a cost of being poor, or the poor pay more, is the phenomenon of people with lower incomes, particularly those living in low-income areas, incurring higher expenses, paying more not only in terms of money, but also in time, health, and opportunity costs. "Costs of poverty" can also refer to the costs to the broader society in which poverty exists.

== Economic principles ==
A ghetto tax is not a tax in the literal sense. It is a situation in which people pay higher costs for equivalent goods or services simply because they are poor or live in a poor area. A paper by the Brookings Institution, titled From Poverty, Opportunity: Putting the Market to Work for Lower Income Families, is widely cited as a study into ghetto taxes, although the report itself does not use the term.

The problem of ghetto taxes is closely associated with mobility; one study in the United States showed that higher prices might be prevalent in some neighborhoods, but people with access to a car would have more access to affordable goods and services elsewhere, whilst those without a car would bear the brunt of higher local prices.

== Examples of costs to impoverished ==
- Consumer finance: Lower income consumers are much more reliant upon alternative financial services that are more expensive, such as check cashers and payday lenders, pawnshops, and auto-title lenders. For those with a traditional bank, customers who can maintain a minimum bank balance can avoid fees, such as monthly fees, or qualify for higher interest rates on their deposits, while overdrafts can rack up hundreds of dollars of debt in just a few days. There are fewer ATMs in poor areas, and often they are third-party machines that charge fees to all users. An area with inadequate access to traditional financial services is known as a banking desert.
- Health: Poorer people have worse and more expensive health conditions, and poorer neighborhoods have fewer doctors' offices, medical facilities, and pharmacies, a phenomenon known as a medical desert or pharmacy desert. People with no or low-quality health insurance receive less preventive and routine health care, leading to poorer health. Medically harmful environmental pollution can be higher in minority neighborhoods, such as in fenceline communities. Due to this decreased access to care, maternal mortality and infant mortality rates tend to be higher in such areas, as well as premature and underweight births. This has cascading effects on communities in psychological, social, political, and economic costs of varying degrees. These conditions are often correlated with various psychological and medical chronic conditions, disabilities, and/or disorders such as ADHD. As an example, the costs of diagnosis are also significant; the firm Neal Psychological Services in the state of Illinois, USA charges $1,470 for 4 evaluative sessions and testing for ADHD. Lack of access to mental healthcare is prevalent among impoverished communities in no small part because of its prohibitively expensive costs.
- Transportation: Poorer neighborhoods tend to have fewer nearby jobs, requiring longer commutes and higher transportation costs in terms of both time and money. This can decrease employment opportunities, increasing unemployment. Public transportation tends to underserve poorer areas, a situation known as a transit desert, which can reduce access to quality schools, health care, food, and other products at affordable prices. Poorer neighborhoods often have fewer street and sidewalk improvements, including curb ramps that help not only disabled people using wheelchairs, walkers, and canes, but also people with babies using strollers, and those engaging in exercise such as cycling. These inequalities are known as the transport divide. Highways tend to be routed through poorer neighborhoods, carving up communities and walling them off from more prosperous areas.
- Groceries and food access: Small dollar stores that provide little to no fresh food tend to cluster in low-income neighborhoods, driving out fuller service grocery stores and supermarkets that provide more fresh food. The price of fresh food then becomes more expensive due to the added costs of the consumer's transportation to more distant stores in both time and money, or because stores that stock fresh food in low-income communities do so at higher prices, due to factors such as fewer economies of scale in purchasing power, sales volume, and managing the supply chain of perishable food. Other stores that may provide food to low-income areas include gas stations and convenience stores, neither of which tend to carry much fresh food. Areas without access to fresh food are known as food deserts. In addition, landlords, HOAs, and/or local laws have strict rules about land use in the form of zoning laws, which may not allow for people to plant gardens for either community or private use, which further hinders access to food. This disproportionately impacts impoverished people because they cannot easily access grocery stores as a replacement source of food due to food deserts, transportation costs, and threat of crime.
- General retail: Although studies have reached different conclusions, there is evidence to suggest that the poor and wealthy pay roughly the same prices when buying the same products. However, inflation on basic, low-priced goods purchased by lower-income consumers can rise faster than on goods purchased by higher-income earners. Rent-to-own and consumer financing terms tend to have high interest rates and are mostly used by people unable to pay the full costs of their purchases up-front. Poorer consumers are less able to afford bulk purchases, losing out on volume discounts. A particular case of higher retail costs and health costs converging involves cigarettes, with poorer people more likely to have a nicotine addiction in part due to cigarette marketing targeting low-income communities. In addition to the health costs of tobacco use, the unit price to purchase cigarettes is higher in a single pack vs. a larger carton, and can be higher still when purchased as individual cigarettes, whether legally or illegally. While illegal purchases of single cigarettes can avoid taxes, they carry the risk of costly criminal penalties.
- Credit Card Rewards: Merchants pay two fees when customers use cards: a processor (acquirer) fee and an interchange fee that the card networks set and that ultimately goes to the card-issuing bank. Interchange rates differ by the type of store and the type of card, and reward or premium credit cards usually have higher rates than basic cards or PIN-based debit transactions. Because card-network rules and common practice generally forbid charging different posted prices for different payment methods (the “no-surcharge” / anti-steering rule), stores usually raise their regular prices to cover card costs instead of charging some customers more at checkout. That means cash users, debit users, and people with low-reward cards often subsidize the rewards given to high-reward cardholders. Studies that model and measure these effects find this pricing can be regressive: wealthier people use credit cards more, so lower-income, cash-dependent households end up paying a larger share of the cost of rewards programs, and interchange revenue is a main source of funding for those rewards.
- Utilities: Consumers without sufficient credit or who have missed utility payments may be charged high deposits or (re-)connection fees to receive utilities. Low-income consumers may have prepaid electricity, and rates can be higher than with a contract. The consequence of prepaid electricity running out can range from refrigerated food spoiling to going without lights, heat, internet, and economic opportunity. Poor people are also more likely to pay higher prices for long-distance phone calls.
- Government services: When government services involve more complicated and frequent application, maintenance, and renewal processes, and more requirements and preconditions, fewer people end up receiving those services, and poorer people with fewer resources are more likely to be excluded. Florida made the process of applying for unemployment more difficult in order to reduce claims, according to the governor. There are inefficiencies in the unemployment system elsewhere in the U.S. People with more expensive homes in wealthier areas are more likely to be approved for disaster aid from FEMA than people with more affordable homes in poorer areas, and difficulties with the application process play a role. FEMA is also more likely to buy out homes in wealthier areas. Certain aid only goes to communities that can already afford to pay a portion of the aid costs. The Army Corps of Engineers uses a cost-benefit analysis that favors protecting more expensive homes with flood control systems.
- Small business loans: Attempts to provide more resources to underserved neighborhoods can be challenged by banks' reluctance to provide loans to businesses in low-income areas, as well as costlier loan terms. Business insurance can also cost more in low-income neighborhoods.
- Insurance: Poorer people are less likely to have money to pay for insurance coverage, leaving them more vulnerable to financial losses after adverse impacts.
- Environment: Lower-income and minority areas have often been targeted as sites for environmental hazards or general hazards to property values that those with more political power don't want in their neighborhoods, increasing costs to poor people's health and decreasing the net worth of the neighborhoods' homeowners. Such hazards can include landfills, power plants, chemical plants, oil wells, oil and chemical pipelines, industrial parks, sewage treatment plants, fracking sites, incinerators, quarries, prisons, adult entertainment clubs, railways, highways, airports, and seaports. Routing highways and other major thoroughfares through minority neighborhoods not only increased pollution in those communities, it also eliminated many minority communities, or created barriers that cut those communities off from their more prosperous surroundings, surroundings that certain families, including black families, were historically barred from moving to due to redlining and other housing discrimination. Prior to being carved through by highways, minority neighborhoods were often severed by railways, inspiring the phrase, "the wrong side of the tracks."
- Justice system: Poor people are more likely than wealthier people to be fined or jailed for the same crime, or to be wrongfully convicted of a crime, and poor neighborhoods can be targeted for more police enforcement actions than wealthier neighborhoods. Courts can impose fines and fees that result in court debt, incarceration, and driver's license suspension for those who can't pay. Courts can impose cash bail, requiring the accused, while presumed innocent, to make a refundable cash deposit in order to get out of jail before a trial, with the money not refunded if the accused is not on time for all of their court dates. Someone who is unable to pay the full bail amount may purchase a bail bond, under which the accused pays a non-refundable percentage of the bail amount and promises collateral like a car, home, or jewelry to the bond issuer in return for the bond issuer paying the full bail amount to the court. A bond issuer may hire a bounty hunter to capture a creditor who does not appear in court. While in jail, the accused can be charged high fees for communications such as phone calls and emails, and for commissary items.
- Crime: Housing tends to be more affordable in neighborhoods with higher crime rates, and poorer people are therefore more likely to become victims of crimes that cost money to recover from. Crime deterrence measures, such as security systems, can pose additional costs.

== Costs of poverty to broader society ==
Poverty not only creates costs for those experiencing it, but also for the broader society in which poverty exists, through externalities. For example, Walmart and McDonald's employ much of the United States' recipients of federal aid programs such as SNAP and Medicaid, according to the Government Accountability Office, and so the cost burden of servicing these people falls on the public while the benefits of their work flow to the companies employing them. In addition, those who are poor are less likely to save for retirement, emergencies, or other expenses due to the pressing need for the money in the present. This results in higher financial stress and more retirees working despite receiving Social Security checks. This higher stress in turn decreases life expectancy, which costs society in lost social and cultural capital. In total, according to the Poor People's Campaign, around 250,000 people a year in the US die of poverty. Roughly $1.442 trillion are lost annually to poverty and resulting effects, whether it be hunger, education costs and outcomes, healthcare, crime, or homelessness and related issues. As an industry designed to take advantage of financial vulnerability of impoverished individuals, the poverty industry also earns $33 billion per year in the US.

== See also ==
- Basic needs
- Book desert
- Boots theory
- Causes of mental disorders
- Correlates of crime
- Criticism of capitalism
- Cycle of poverty
- Disease of despair
- Diseases of poverty
- Economic inequality
- Environmental justice
- Forced rider
- Multiple deprivation index
- Poverty industry
- Poverty reduction
- Proletariat
- Redlining
- Regressive tax
- Sin tax
- Social inequality
- Social insurance
- Social mobility
- Social welfare program
- Winner and loser culture
