= Isochrone =

Isochrone may refer to:

- Stellar isochrone, the curve on the Hertzsprung–Russell diagram representing stars of the same age
- Isochrone curve, the curve (a cycloid) for which objects starting at different points finish at the same time and point when released
- Isochrone map, shows areas related to isochrones between different points
