= Medical desert =

Area that has limited access to healthcare

Medical desert is a term used to describe regions whose population has inadequate access to healthcare. Medical deserts are not only defined by distance but also by the availability of providers. Even if a hospital exists, there may not be enough doctors or specialists to meet the needs of the population. This leads to long wait times and delays in receiving care. As a result, people living in these areas often experience worse health outcomes, including higher rates of chronic diseases, preventable conditions, and death.The term can be applied whether the lack of healthcare is general or in a specific field, such as dental or pharmaceutical. It is primarily used to describe rural areas although it is sometimes applied to urban areas as well. Barriers such as transportation, cost, and provider shortages also prevent many individuals from accessing healthcare services regularly. The term is inspired by the analogous concept of a food desert.

== United States ==
An estimated 30 million Americans, many in rural regions of the country, live at least 60 minutes drive from a hospital with trauma care services. For example, rural areas in states like Mississippi, West Virginia, and parts of Texas have experienced hospital closures, leaving residents without nearby emergency care. In some cases, people must travel over an hour to reach the nearest hospital. This distance creates serious challenges, especially during emergencies when time is critical. Limited access to emergency room services, as well as medical specialists, leads to increases in mortality rates and long-term health problems, such as heart disease and diabetes. Medicare, Medicaid, and uninsured patients are less likely than others to live within an hour's drive of a hospital emergency room.

Since 1975, over 1,000 hospitals, many in rural regions, have closed their doors because they are unable to bear the cost of care for uninsured patients. The risk of hospital closures has been increasing over the years as almost 700 rural hospitals are at risk of closing due to financial problems such as smaller patient populations and inadequate payment from insurance plans. This has required some patients in every state to drive at least an hour to a hospital emergency room. The problem poses an even greater danger during the COVID-19 pandemic, when patients in respiratory distress urgently need oxygen and can ill afford an hour-long ambulance ride to reach a hospital. In addition to the immediate financial problems facing rural healthcare providers, inequities in rural healthcare are further aggravated by the disproportionately low number of newly-graduated doctors applying for positions in rural areas. Many doctors decline to work in rural areas due to factors such as low pay and only around 11% of physicians practice in rural areas. It is projected that there will be a shortage of more than 20,000 primary care physicians living in rural areas by 2025.

Although concentrated in rural regions, health care deserts also exist in urban and suburban areas, particularly in Black-majority census tracts in Chicago, Los Angeles, and New York City. Transportation also plays a major role. Many individuals in medical deserts lack reliable access to a car or public transportation. Without transportation, even nearby healthcare services can become inaccessible. This issue disproportionately affects low-income populations, elderly individuals, and people with chronic illnesses who require frequent visits. Medical literature addressing health disparities in urban centers has applied the term medical desert to areas that are more than five miles from the nearest acute care facility. Racial demographic disparities in healthcare access are also present in rural areas, particularly with Native Americans living in rural areas receiving inadequate medical care. Factors such physician shortages and transportational barriers exacerbate healthcare disparities for the native American population leading postponement of care.

Pharmacy deserts have developed in some urban areas, a situation that has increased the challenge of distributing and administering vaccines for the COVID-19 pandemic. Pharmacy deserts have grown to become a major problem in the United States as around 15 million people live in Pharmacy deserts. Without pharmacies being close by it will be harder to obtain prescription and medicine for people, leading to people having to travel farther to get their prescription filled out.

Dental deserts have also begun to grow; as of 2021 there are 60 million Americans who are experiencing a shortage of dentist where they live. More than 6,000 areas in the United States are in a region where there is a shortage of dentists. It is projected that with this need there would need to be an increase of nearly 10,000 new hired dentist in order to help fill the demand. Rural areas are the most negatively impacted by dental deserts and face negative health problems such as tooth loss and other dental complications that may arise from prolonged postponement of one's dental health.

Cost and lack of insurance further increase barriers to care. Many individuals avoid seeking medical attention because they cannot afford it. Even those with insurance may face high out-of-pocket costs for visits, medications, and treatments. This creates a cycle where individuals delay care until their conditions become severe, leading to worse outcomes and higher healthcare costs in the long run.

== Health Outcomes ==
The lack of access to healthcare in medical deserts leads to serious health consequences. When individuals delay care, diseases such as diabetes, heart disease, and cancer may go undetected until they reach advanced stages. At this point, treatment becomes more difficult, more expensive, and less effective.

Limited access to preventive care is another major issue. Preventive services, such as screenings, vaccinations, and routine check-ups, are essential for identifying health problems early. Without these services, individuals are at a higher risk of developing severe conditions that could have been prevented or managed earlier.

People living in medical deserts also face challenges in managing chronic conditions. Conditions like hypertension, asthma, and diabetes require consistent monitoring and medication. Without regular access to healthcare providers, patients may struggle to control these conditions, leading to complications and hospitalizations.

These issues contribute to broader health disparities. Populations in rural and underserved areas often have higher rates of illness and lower life expectancy compared to those in areas with better healthcare access. This shows that medical deserts are not just a healthcare issue but also a social inequality problem that affects entire communities.

== Solutions ==
Experts suggest several ways to improve healthcare access in medical deserts. Increasing funding for rural hospitals can help them stay open, hire more staff, and expand services. Improving transportation, such as expanding public transit or creating healthcare transportation programs, can make it easier for people to attend appointments. Another important solution is increasing the number of healthcare providers in underserved areas by offering incentives like loan forgiveness and higher pay, while also expanding the role of nurse practitioners who can provide basic medical care. Telehealth is another effective option because it allows patients to meet with doctors remotely, reducing the need for long-distance travel and improving access to routine care. Finally, expanding programs like Medicaid can reduce financial barriers, making it easier for individuals to seek care earlier and improving overall health outcomes.

== See also ==
- Banking desert
- Environmental racism
- Fenceline community
- Food desert
- Ghetto tax
- Nursing shortage
- Physician supply
- Transit desert
- Underfunded public school system
