= Transit desert =

Area lacking in transit

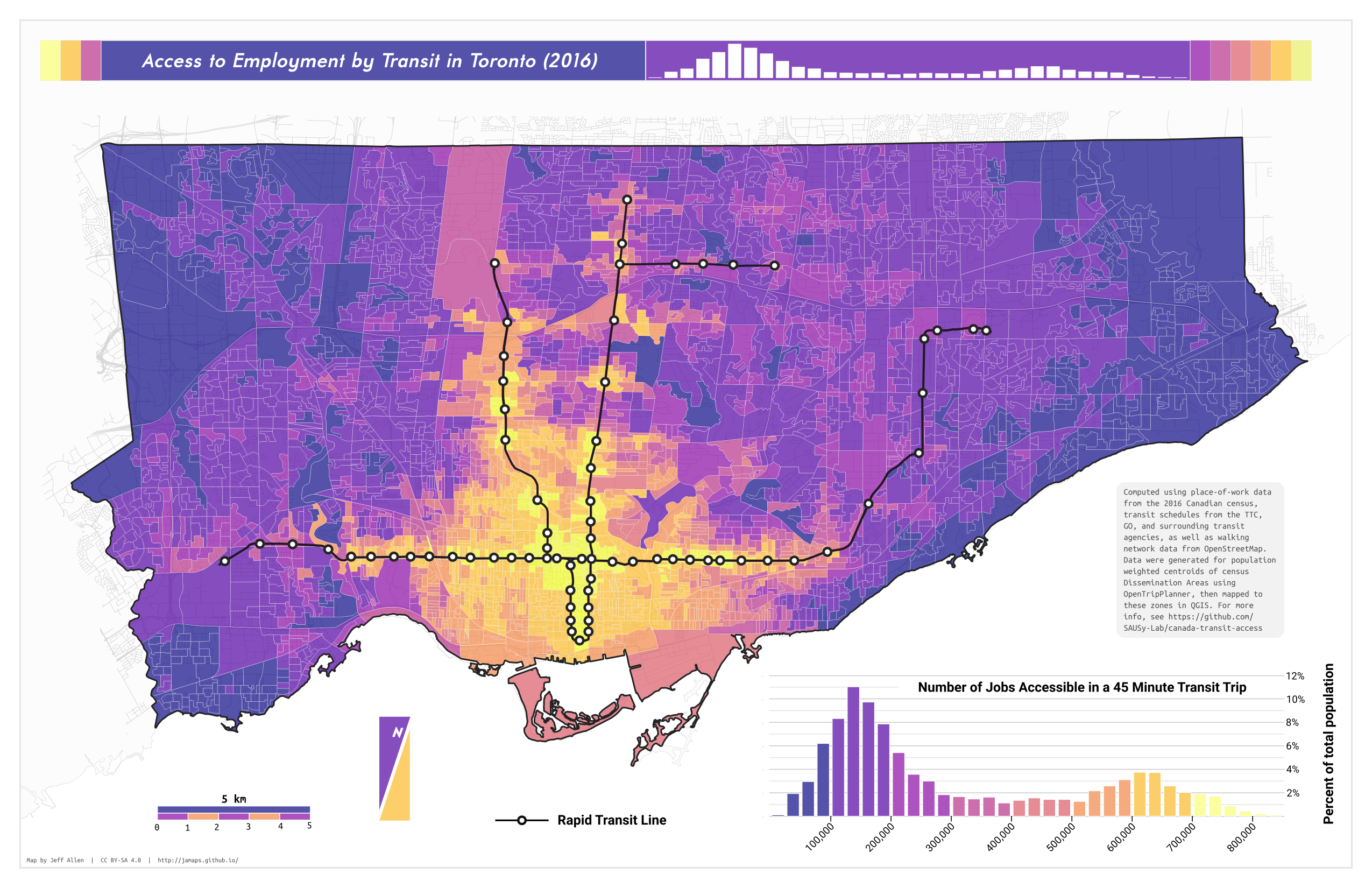
Access to jobs by public transit in Toronto in 2016; note that the map does not include the extension of the western leg of Line 1 Yonge–University to the suburban municipality of Vaughan to the north-northwest, which opened in late 2017

A transit desert is an area with limited transportation supply. Developed from the concept of food deserts, various methods have been proposed to measure transit deserts. Transit deserts are generally characterized by poor public transportation options and possibly poor bike, sidewalk, or road infrastructure. The lack of transportation options present in transit deserts may have negative effects of people’s health, job prospects, and economic mobility.

== History ==
The term 'desert' has been variously applied to areas that lack key services like banks, food access, or even books. The idea of transit deserts was coined by Junfeng Jiao and Maxwell Dillivan, first appearing in print in 2013. Since that time, the concept of transit deserts has been expanded upon and competing definitions and measurement techniques have emerged.

== Definitions ==
=== Gap-based measurements ===
Gap-based measurement techniques are the most prominent and well-defined definition of transit deserts. Such methods typically use Geographic Information Systems (GIS) based methods to measure the gap between transportation supply and demand. These methods quantify demand and supply and then subtract demand from supply in order to find the "gap" in transit service. Areas that fall below a certain threshold are termed "transit deserts". Using this method studies have found that nearly all cities in the United States have transit deserts. Studies have also consistently shown that central business districts are almost never transit deserts, but the locations of transit desert areas varies considerably in different cities.

=== No-transit definition ===
A more informal definition of transit deserts has also emerged in which areas that lack some type of transportation, most often public transportation like buses and subway stops, are termed transit deserts. Sometimes this definition has been expanded or slightly redefined to refer areas that lack a certain type of transportation such as "subway deserts".

== Implications ==
The causes of transit deserts are much debated. Some have cited suburban sprawl and deliberately segregationist policies as some of the leading causes of transit deserts. Still others contend that transit deserts are often the result of poor planning practices and that better transit planning can help alleviate them.

== See also ==
General:

- Banking desert
- Book desert
- Exurb
- Food desert
- Forced rider
- Ghetto tax
- Isochrone map
- Medical desert
- Poverty map
- Redlining
- Urban resilience
- Urban prairie

Transport:

- Accessibility (transport)
- Automotive city – Urban planning prioritising automobiles
- Carfree city – Urban area absent of motor vehicles
- Freedom of movement
- Freedom Riders – American civil rights activists of the 1960s
- Montgomery bus boycott – 1950s American protest against racial segregation
- Public transport accessibility level – Measure of access to public transport
- Sustainable Development Goal 11 – 11th of 17 Sustainable Development Goals for sustainable cities
- Transit mall – Urban street reserved for public transit, bicycles, and pedestrians
- Transport divide – Unequal access to transport
