= Public transport accessibility level =

Measure of access to public transport

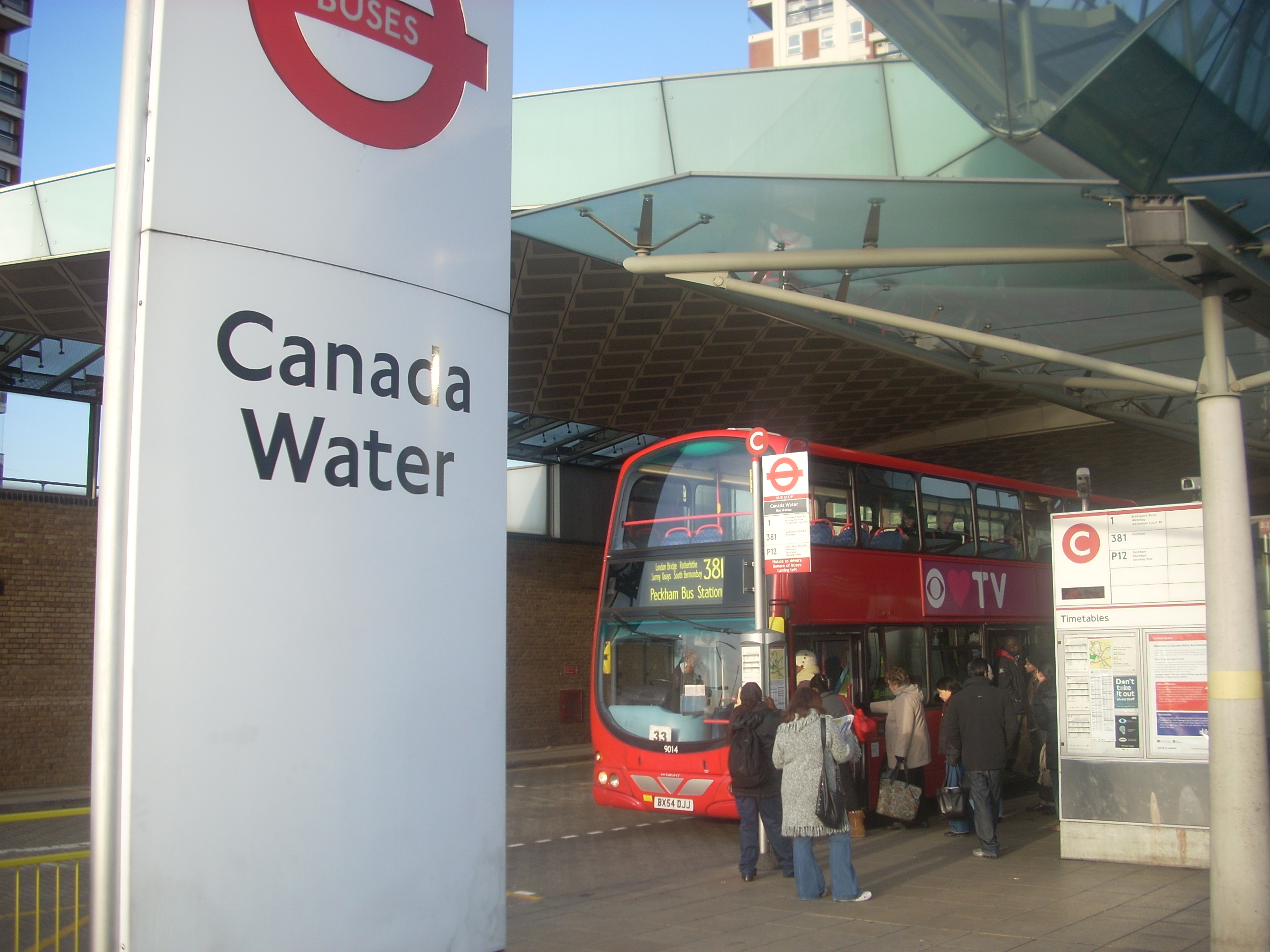
Public transport in action – pedestrians boarding a bus at Canada Water bus station in London.

The public transport accessibility level (PTAL) is a method sometimes used in United Kingdom transport planning to assess the access level of geographical areas to public transport.

PTAL is a simple, easily calculated approach that hinges on the distance from any point to the nearest public transport stop, and service frequency at those stops. The result is a grade from 1–6 (including sub-divisions 1a, 1b, 6a and 6b), where a PTAL of 1a indicates extremely poor access to the location by public transport, and a PTAL of 6b indicates excellent access by public transport.

== Background ==
The PTAL calculation was originally developed by the Borough of Hammersmith and Fulham in 1992, and was later adopted by Transport for London in 2004 as the standard method for calculation of public transport access in London. It is not commonly used outside Greater London or the south east of England.

== Method ==
The first stage in PTAL calculation is to calculate the walking distance from the site (known as the point of interest (POI)) to the nearest bus stops and rail stations (where rail can be taken to also include London Underground, DLR and trams). These stops and stations are known as service access points (SAPs). Only SAPs within a certain distance of the POI are included (640m for bus stops and 960m for rail stations, which correspond to a walking time of 8 minutes and 12 minutes respectively at the standard assumed walking speed of 80m/min).

The next stage is to determine the service level during the morning peak (defined as 0815–0915) for each route serving a SAP. Where service levels differ in each direction on a route, the highest frequency is taken. On railways, a route is generally defined as a service with a particular calling pattern – for example, services on the Piccadilly line from Hammersmith could be divided into two "routes": Cockfosters to Heathrow and Cockfosters to Uxbridge.

A total access time for each route is then calculated by adding together the walking time from the POI to the SAP and the average waiting time for services on the route (i.e. half the headway). This is converted to an equivalent doorstep frequency (EDF) by dividing 30 (minutes) by the total access time, which is intended to convert total access time to a "notional average waiting time, as though the route were available at the doorstep of the POI".

A weighting is applied to each route to simulate the enhanced reliability and attractiveness of a route with a higher frequency over other routes. For each mode (e.g. bus, Tube, DLR, tram, rail), the route with the highest frequency is given a weighting of 1.0, with all other routes in that mode weighted at 0.5.

Finally, the EDF and the weighting are multiplied to produce an accessibility index for each route, and the accessibility indices for all routes are summed to produce an overall accessibility index for the POI.

This accessibility index (AI) can then be converted to a PTAL grade (1–6) through a banding system (where AIs 0.00–5.00 are PTAL 1, 5.01–10.00 are PTAL 2, etc. up to PTAL 6 for scores of 25 and above).

TfL introduced the WebCAT automatic calculator in 2015.

== Uses ==
The PTAL is used as a development planning tool in London, to determine both permitted parking standards and development densities. Large site developments (those the London boroughs refer to the Greater London Authority) must follow planning guidelines that allow more parking in areas with low PTALs (i.e., poor public transport) and vice versa—and that also relate the allowed density of development to PTAL (i.e., areas with better public transport may have higher density housing or offices).

TfL also have software to calculate PTALs across wide areas using GIS and timetable data, the typical result being a map with coloured bands relating to PTAL grades.

== Application in other areas ==
=== Ahmedabad ===
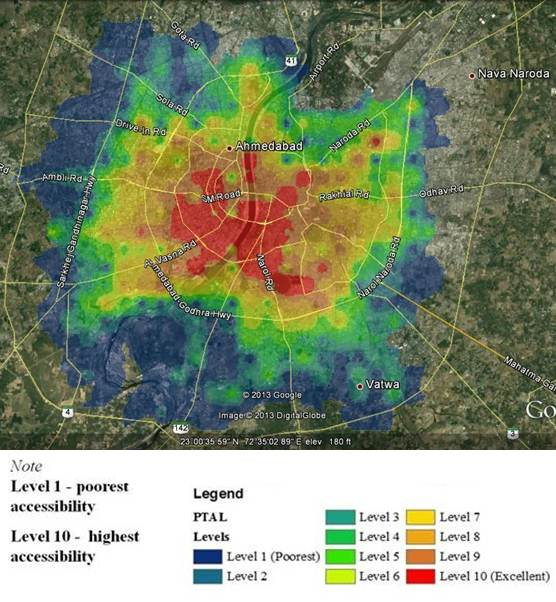
Ahmedabad PTAL 2014

The London PTAL method was first applied in the Indian context to Ahmedabad in 2014 (see figure Ahmedabad PTAL 2014) by Bhargav Adhvaryu and Jay Shah. PTAL mapping for other Indian cities if under progress. In the London method, points of interest (POIs) were considered by the actual development (e.g., buildings). However, in Ahmedabad, given the lack of availability of building footprint data at the time of the study, the method deviated by construing POIs as centroids of a 1 km^{2} grid. Given that the purpose of the study was to explore implications of PTAL at a macro-scale (i.e., development/ master plan level – the study area being 465 km^{2}) and the data constraints, the grid-cell approach seemed justified (comparison for which is discussed in the section on Surat application). In addition, it made the computations much faster.

The others adaptation of London method to Ahmedabad included revisiting walk speed and public transport service reliability assumptions. Most of the roads in Ahmedabad do not have footpaths and, if any, are usually occupied by street vendors and parking. Therefore, people are forced to walk on the road (the black-top surface), which creates unsafe and potentially hazardous situations, such that walking is avoided as much as possible, even for short trips. To account for this discomfort walk speed was decreased to 60m/min (based on a few samples) as against 80m/min used in London. The reliability factor added in case of London (to allow for additional wait times) were 2 minutes and 0.75 minutes for buses and rail services, respectively. In Ahmedabad, this was changed to 2.5 minutes for city buses (AMTS) and 1 minute for BRTS (based on empirical observations), and 0.75 minutes was not changed for the proposed metrorail – Ahmedabad Metro (a section of which started operation in March 2019). Lastly, in London 8 minutes (i.e., 640m) and 12 minutes (i.e., 960m) were used as the threshold walk distances to bus and rail SAPs, respectively; SAPs beyond these distances are rejected. However, in Ahmedabad, surveys to determine willingness to walk for public transport were not carried out. Therefore, the farthest SAP from a POI (not accounted for in any other POI) was measured, which turned out to be 993m. At 60m/min, this give as willingness to walk at about 16 minutes, which seemed reasonable.

The Ahmedabad study discussed several uses of PTAL mapping:

1. Improving existing public transport systems by recognizing areas with poor accessibility, thereby enabling decision makers to prioritize investments in public transport systems and support non-motorized transport infrastructure.
2. Formulating parking policies, e.g. park-and-ride facilities could be provided to supplement areas with low and medium PTAL and parking may be restricted or charged at a higher rate in areas with high PTAL.
3. Integrating land use zoning with public transport accessibility. By allowing future transport improvements to be incorporated into PTAL calculations, a future PTAL map becomes an important tool in supporting land use and zoning decisions for local authorities, including introduce transit-oriented development (TOD), as PTALs already incorporate walkability criteria from POIs – an important D (distance to transit) in the 6Ds of TOD. It can also be useful in testing "what if" scenarios using land use – transport interaction models.
4. PTAL maps could be used by households to inform their residential location choices, especially low-income households that are captive public transport users. Real estate developers (who supply housing and commercial spaces) could use PTAL maps (both existing and future) for locating potential projects (especially low-income housing and industrial), while government agencies could use PTAL maps to locate social housing projects.

=== Surat ===
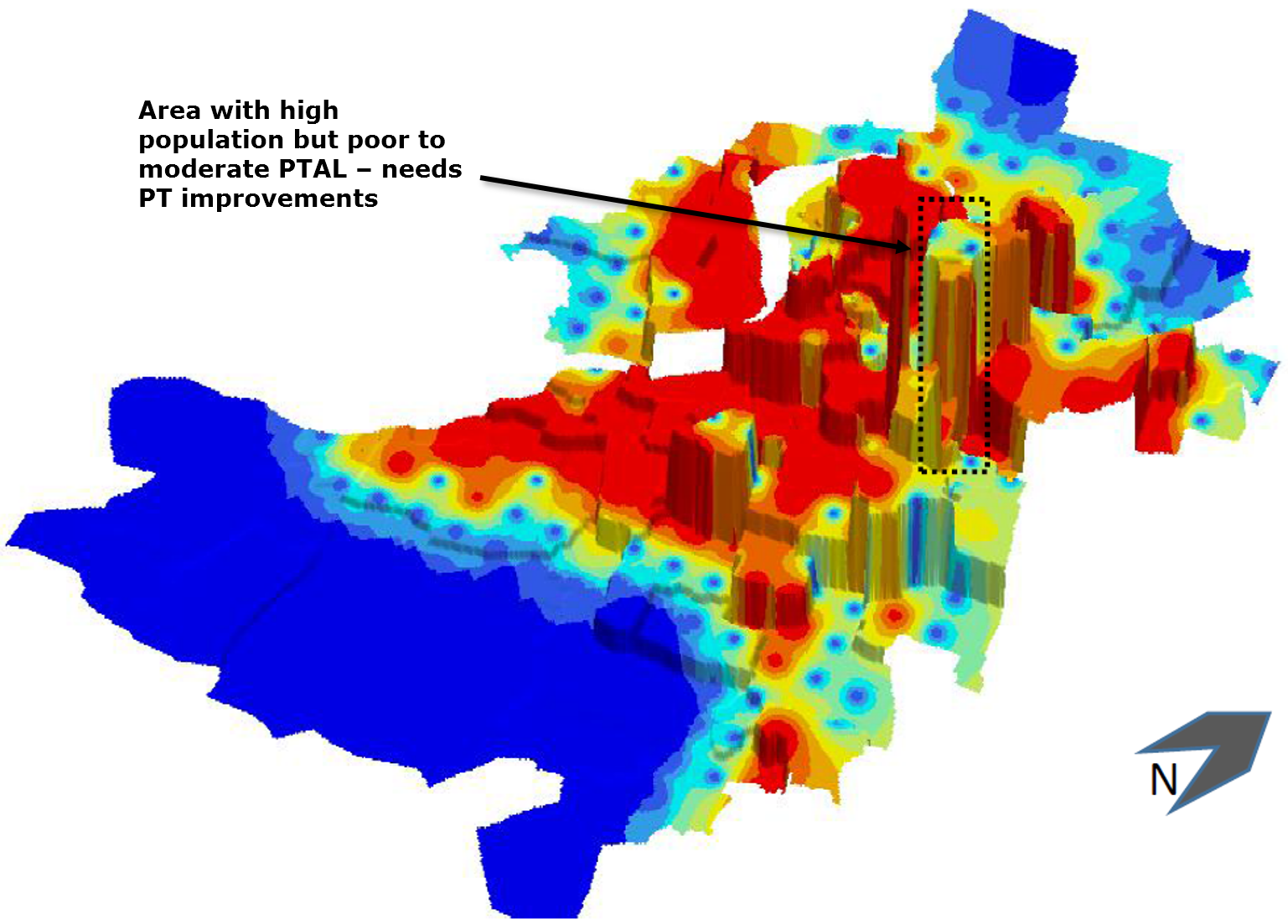
Hubli-Dharwad PTAL 2020 (base year) overlaid on 2011 Census population density

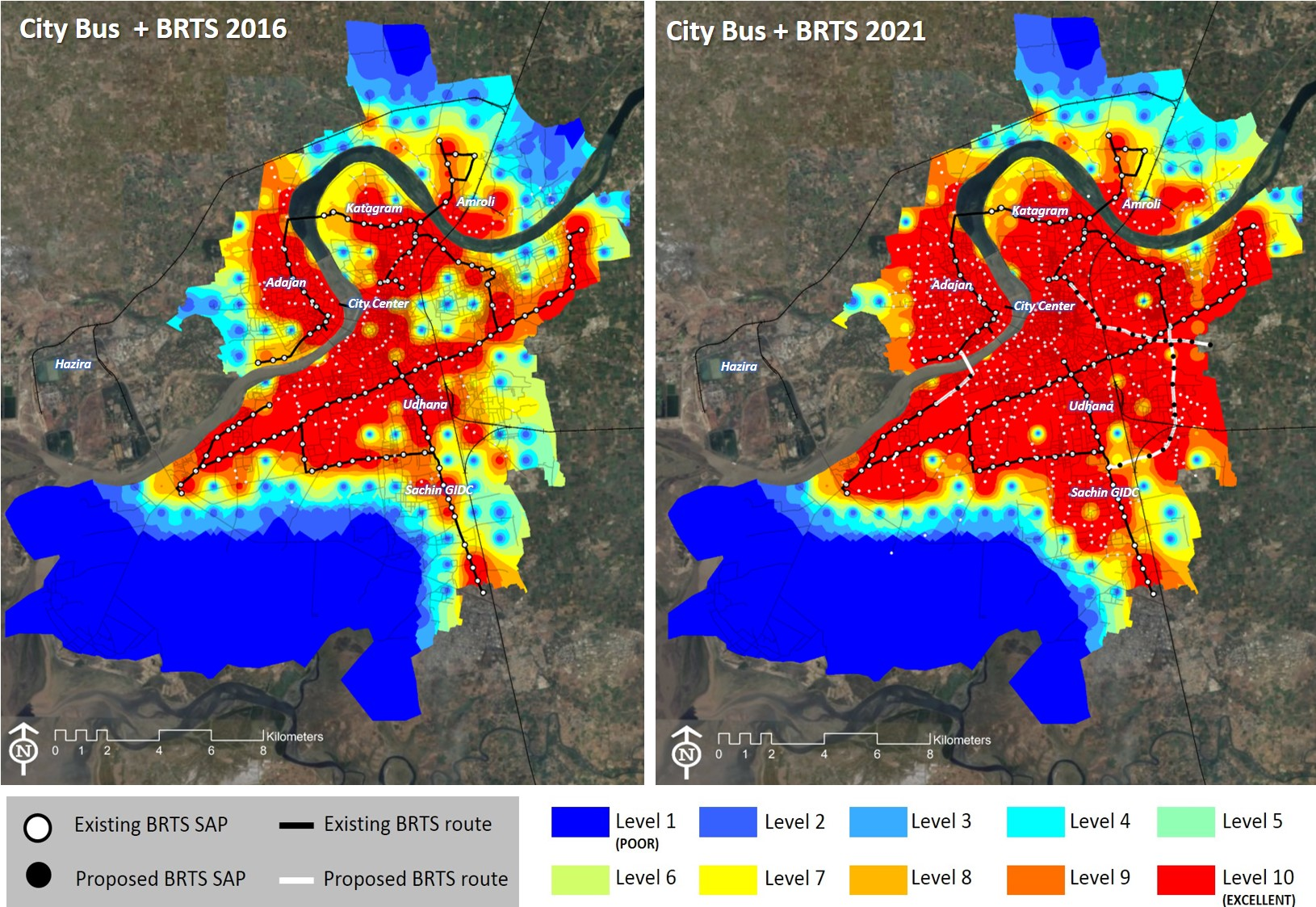
Surat PTAL 2016 v. 2021 (future)

Building from the Ahmedabad case study, PTAL was applied for Surat by Bhargav Adhvaryu, Abhay Chopde, and Lalit Dashora. This application goes beyond the Ahmedabad study in two ways. First, it overlays population density map on PTAL maps (see figure Surat PTAL 2016 overlaid with population density) demonstrating a better way to use PTAL maps to inform public transport investment decisions. Second, it demonstrates the use of PTAL for evaluating future transport investment options. PTAL maps for year 2021 (see figure Surat PTAL 2016 v. 2021 (future)) were generated based on information on future (and committed) proposals to demonstrate PTAL's strategic use to create "what-if" scenarios. The Surat study also explicitly justified the use of 1 km^{2} grid for PTAL mapping in data and resource constrained situations by showing changes in PTAL map resolutions for grid sizes for comparison (see figure Comparison of PTAL map for various grid sizes (Surat)). Of course, smaller grid micro-PTAL maps can be prepared for specific areas of the city, which could be used to fine-tune public transport infrastructure provision at the local area level.

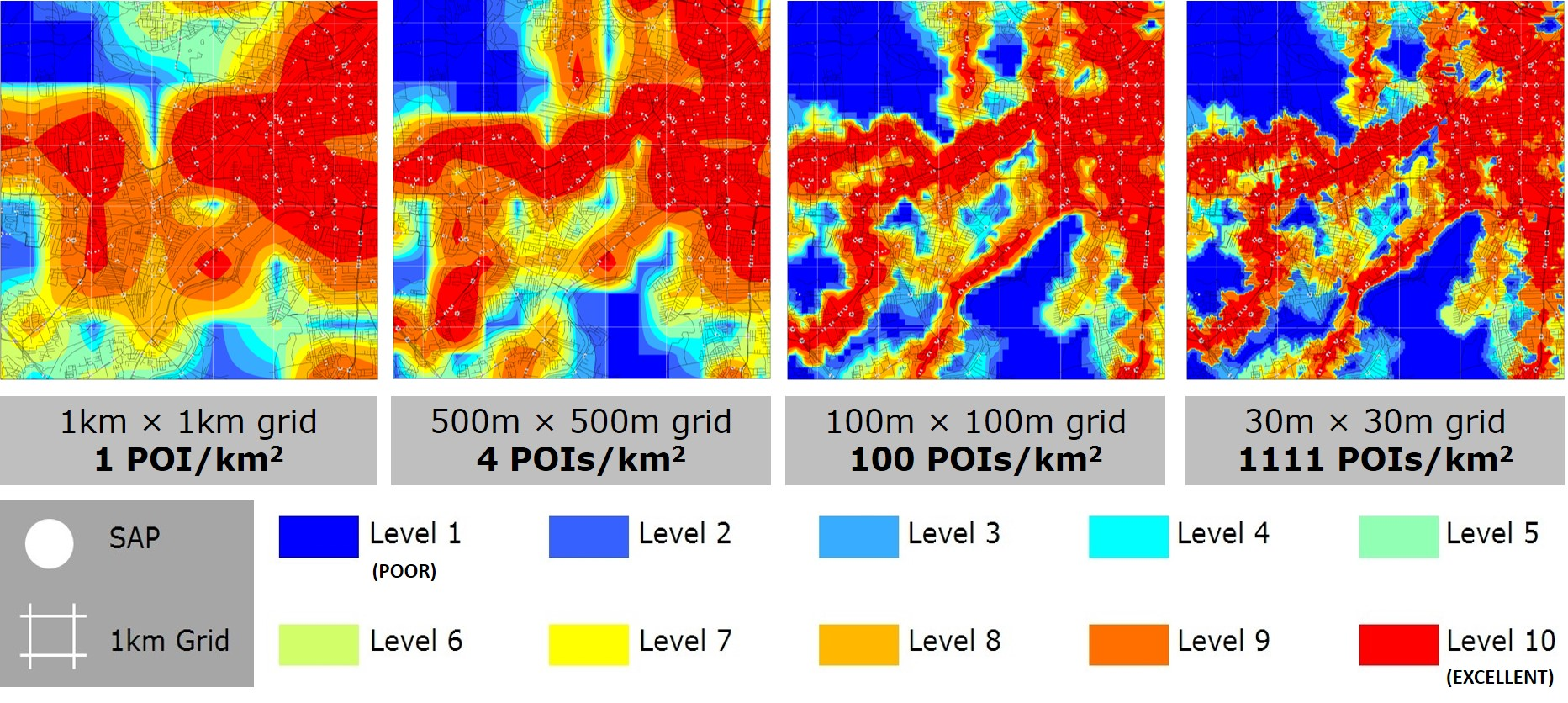
Comparison of PTAL map for various grid sizes (Surat)

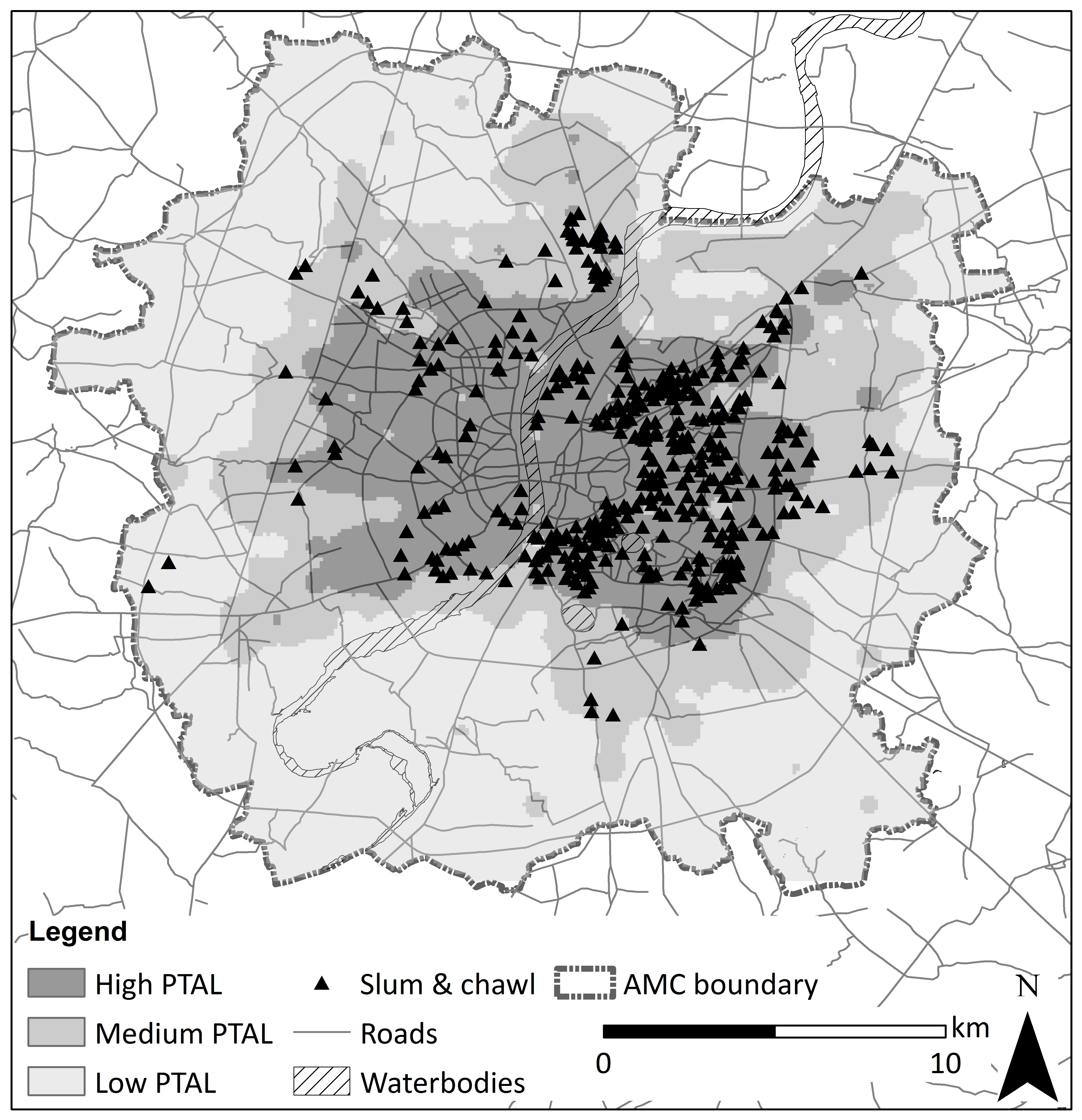
Ahmedabad PTAL 2017 superimposed with slum and chawl location

The Surat study discussed several uses of PTAL mapping such as: [1] prioritising public transport investments [2] Integrating transport in development/master plan [3] informing the parking policy [4] improving residential location choice and optimizing the supply of affordable housing, and [5] understanding the mobility needs of the urban poor, which is based on another study in Ahmedabad. It argues that living in high PTAL areas may not necessarily translate to high accessibility to destination by public transport, especially those urban poor with variable job destination by month and season (e.g., construction workers, casual labourers, street vendors, etc.). Superimposing the housing location of the urban poor on the PTAL map allows identifying specific areas for enhancing the mobility (see figure Ahmedabad PTAL 2017 superimposed with slum and chawl location).

=== Lucknow ===
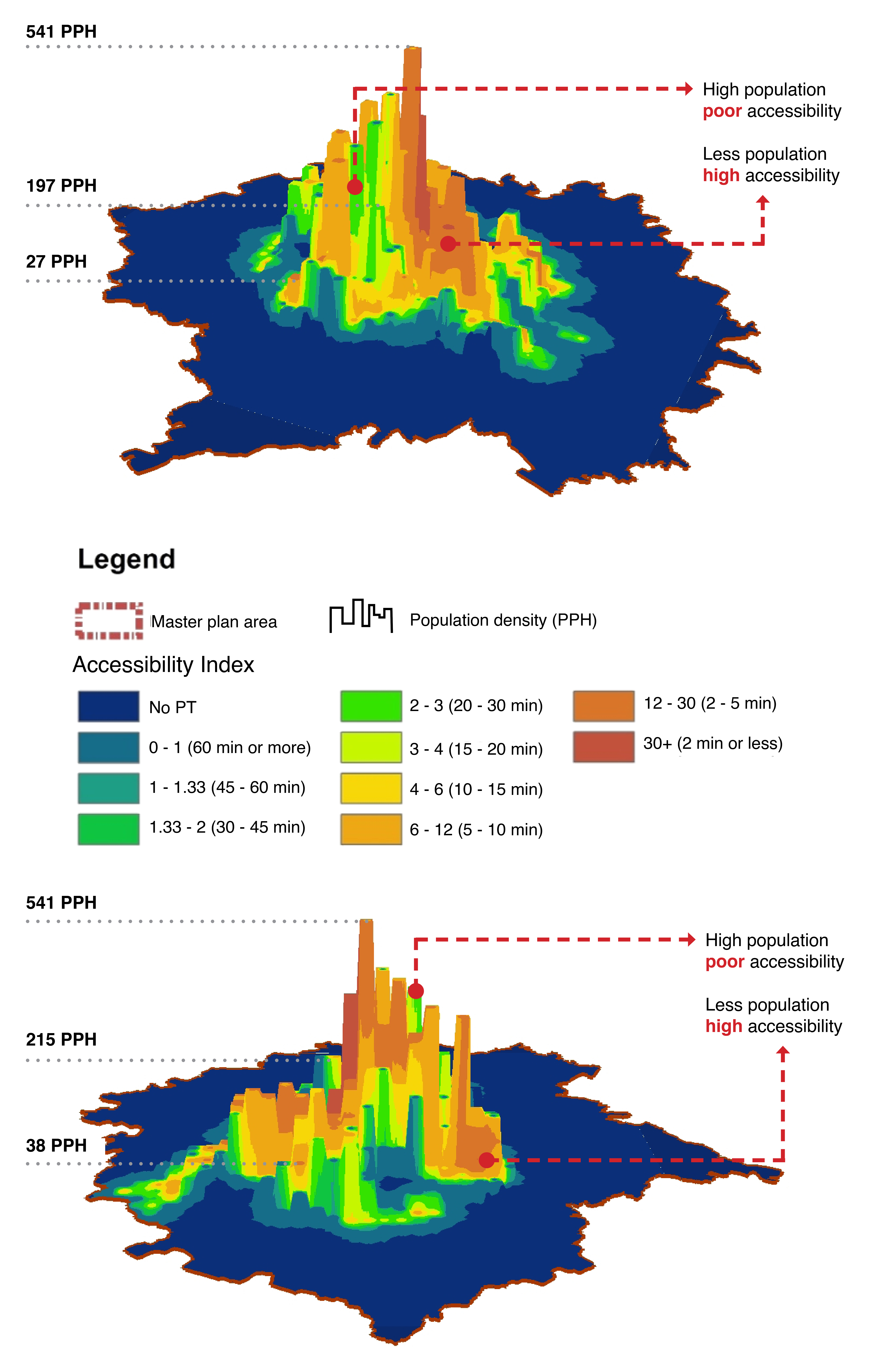
Lucknow PTAL 2020 (baseline scenario) overlaid on population density

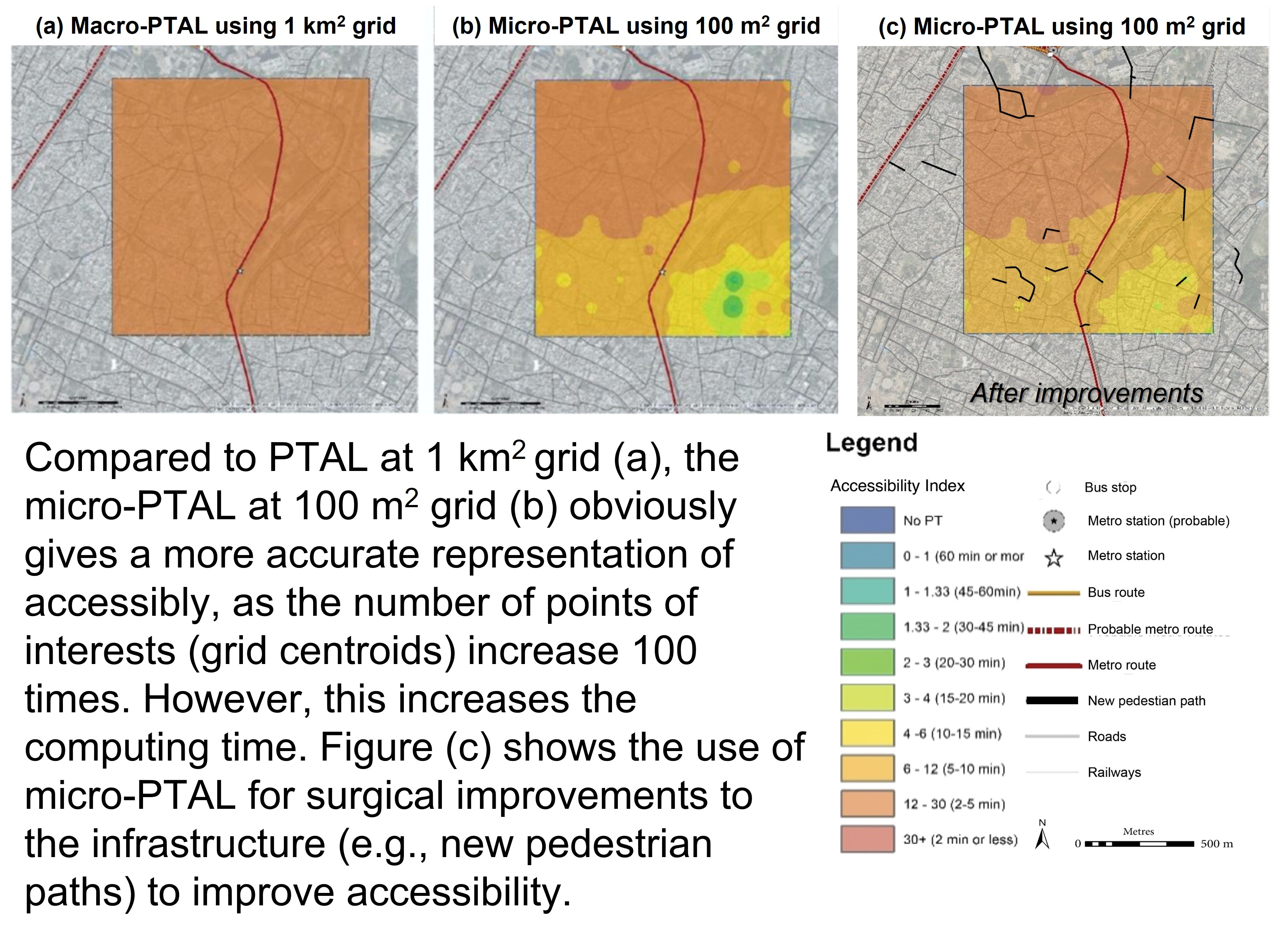
Lucknow PTAL: Macro v. Micro

The PTAL analysis of Indian cities continued with the application of PTAL to Lucknow. The methodology adopted for the PTAL analysis of Ahmedabad and Surat was used to prepare the PTAL map of Lucknow. The maps of the baseline and the tentatively committed scenarios formed the basis for further research on its applications to improve the urban plan-making process. The first application of PTAL was to enhance the statutory development plan. The PTAL map was superimposed over the proposed development plan to validate the congruity of the land use and transport proposals (see figure Lucknow PTAL 2020 (baseline scenario) overlaid on population density). A new public transport network was recommended to improve PTAL in areas most likely to develop in the near future. The second application was to improve the zoning for transit-oriented development. The third application is aimed at making public transport more inclusive. The study found that the proposed public affordable housing projects are in areas with poor PTAL, which could hamper the occupancy in these projects; the slums, on the contrary, were in high-PTAL areas. Recommendations included proposing affordable housing projects in areas having high-PTAL. The fourth application explored was to enhance micro-level plans. An area of 1 km^{2} was assessed using 100 m^{2} grids. The PTAL analysis revealed which areas have poor PTAL. Improvement in the quality of pedestrian infrastructure and street connectivity was recommended; the new PTAL map, thus, generated demonstrated improved PT accessibility (see figure Lucknow PTAL: Macro v. Micro). The authors also proposed combining this tool to develop a holistic dashboard; this could be used by the stakeholders in making more informed decisions focused on land use transport integration.

=== Hubli-Dharwad ===
The PTAL analysis of Indian cities continued with the application of PTAL to Hubli-Dharwad, a twin-city region that is one of fastest-growing cities in Karnataka State. The analysis was based on the methodology adopted for Ahmedabad and Surat, with new methodological innovations (explain below). The city follows a Master Plan 2031 Revision–II (made in 2017 and approved in 2019), which has opened new areas for development. This established the need to analyse the accessibility of the public transport network in relation to the planned future developments that builds on the analysis of the current situation. The mapping provides a visual representation of the existing accessibility levels (see figure Hubli-Dharwad PTAL 2020 (base year) overlaid on 2011 Census population density) that can further be used to facilitate the decision-making process in master plan preparation and guide future public transport investments, rationalise land use distribution, help decide sites for affordable housing locations, and support the demarcation of transit-oriented development (TOD) zone demarcation. The base year PTAL is also important to compare the PTALs with future year.

In the study, the PTAL map was superimposed with the proposed Master Plan 2031, which envisions Hubli-Dharwad to grow as a compact and equitable city. A key methodological step was to start with the base year PTAL map and overlay layers of existing land use, job density, development and demand potential, PT improvement leading to a robust public-transport centric development plan for 2031 (see figure Methodology to arrive at a robust PT-centric future plan (2031)). Considering these future (2031) PT improvements, the PTAL was then prepared (see figure Hubli-Dharwad PTAL 2031 (future year) with bus rapid transit and mini-bus feeder systems). As can be seen, the average accessibility index in the base year (2020) is 3.6 (buses/hour), which improves to 5.5 buses/hour for 2031.

Recommendations were made to improve public transport infrastructure to ensure synchronisation with the existing job centres and proposed development. The PTAL map was also superimposed on proposed affordable housing locations in the Master Plan to assess accessibility to public transport, and hence, recommendations were made to improve connectivity to these zones. The proposed TOD zone demarcation along the BRT corridor was also overlaid on the PTAL map to validate accessibility levels in the zone.

=== Greater Manchester ===
- Transport for Greater Manchester developed the Greater Manchester Accessibility Level (GMAL) method. This is similar to the PTAL calculation but uses "crow flies" distances to Service Access Points. It also includes an additional score for "Local Link" demand responsive transport services.

=== New South Wales ===
Transport for New South Wales also uses an adapted version of the PTAL method.

== Advantages & disadvantages ==
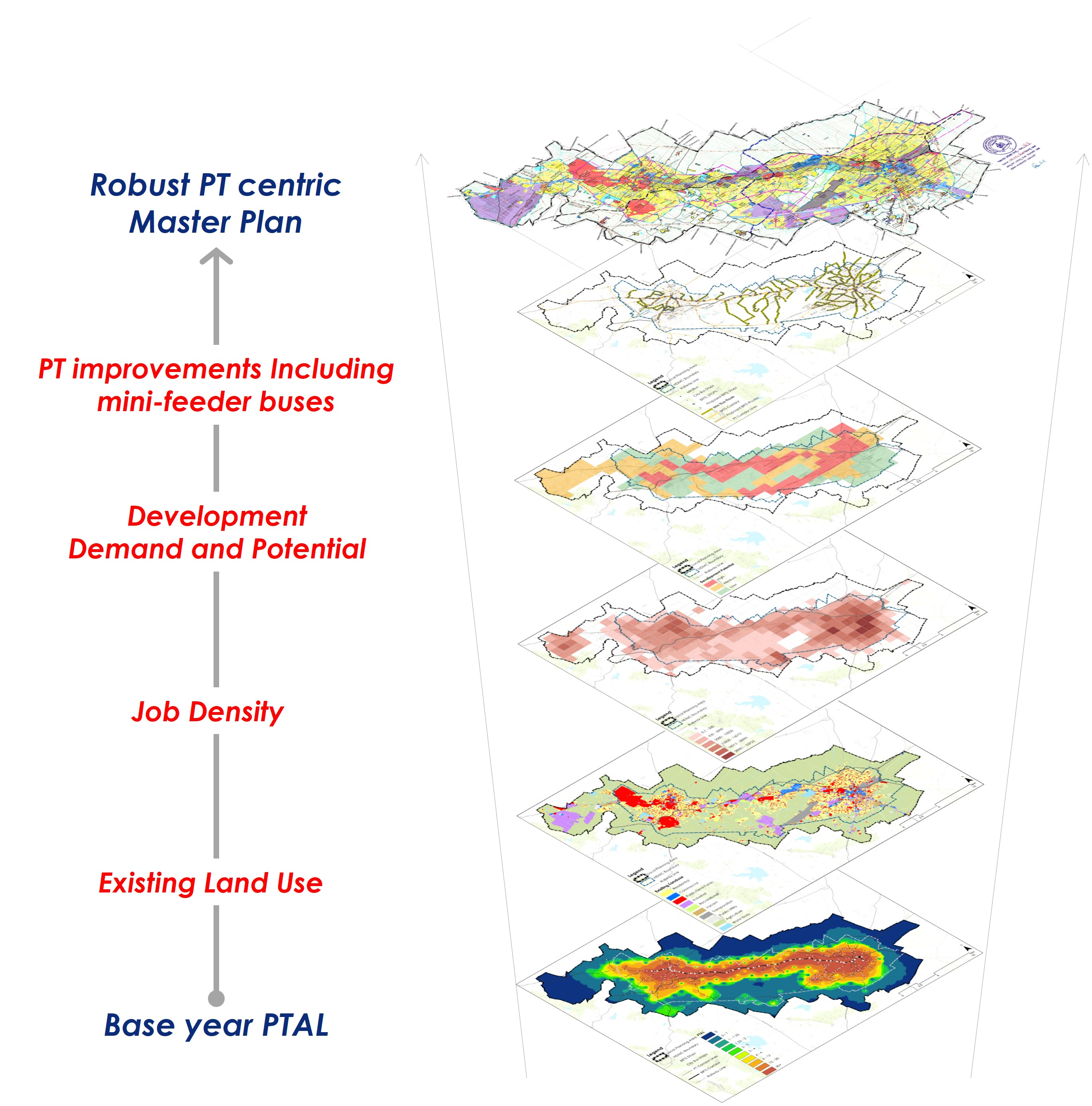
Methodology to arrive at a robust PT-centric future plan (2031)

Whilst PTAL is a simple calculation (easily performed by a spreadsheet) that offers an obvious indication of the density of public transport provision in an area, it suffers two key problems:

- It does not take into account where services actually go to – for example, a bus that runs every ten minutes to the bottom of the road is considered better than a bus that runs every twelve minutes to the city centre.
- The use of arbitrary cut-offs to exclude more distant service access points underestimates the ability to access locations just outside those cut-off distances. For example, a point 960m from King's Cross could have a PTAL of 6, whilst a point 961m from the same station could have a PTAL of 1 or 2.

Accessibility modelling has been proposed as a solution to these problems. It uses GIS to calculate door-to-door travel times by public transport to a grid of points around the point of interest, resulting in a set of isochrone maps – journey time contours – within which the number of workplaces, households or residents can be calculated using census data. This method takes into account many more factors than PTAL, but is much more time-consuming and requires a level of expertise with GIS software and methodologies.

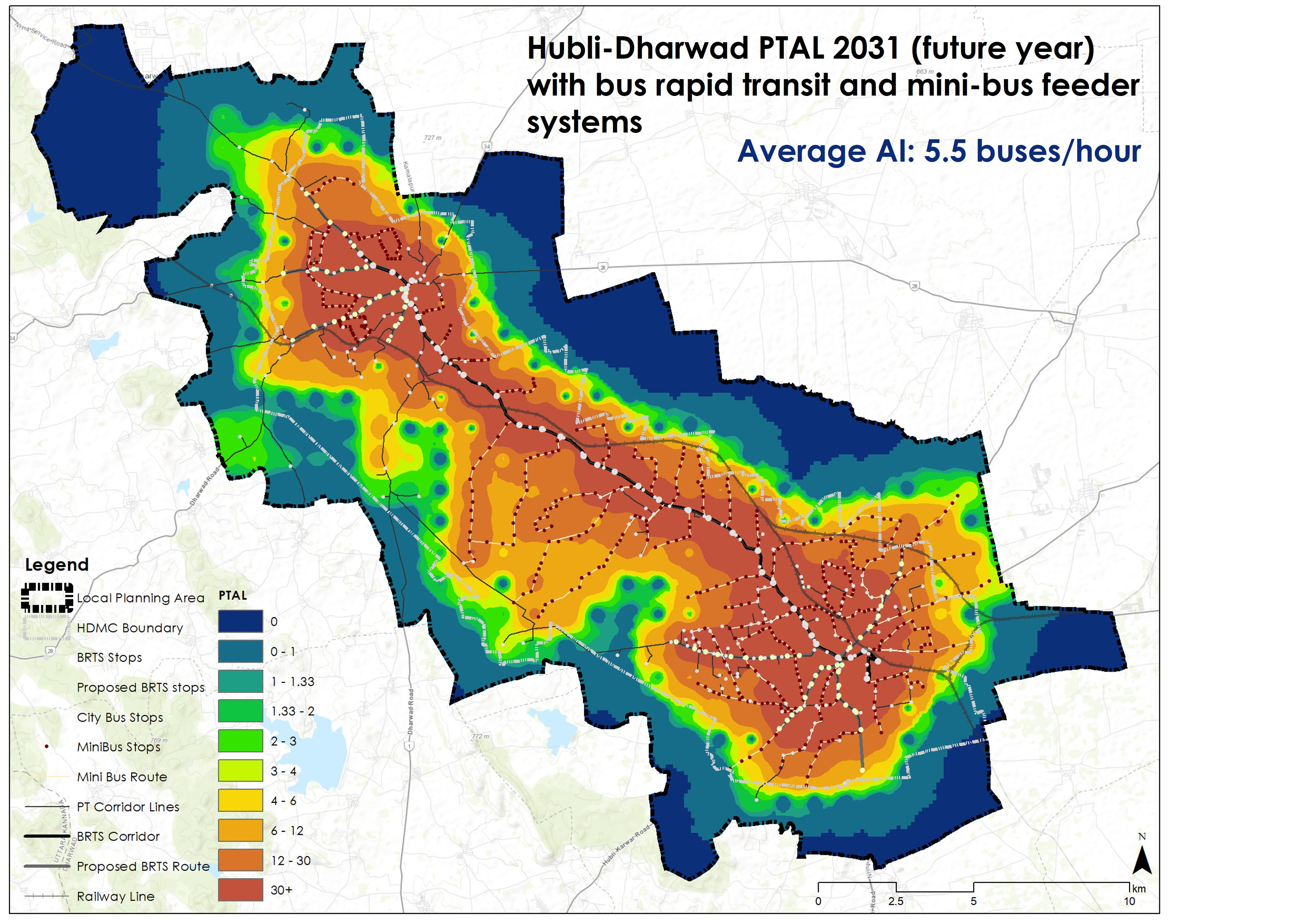
Hubli-Dharwad PTAL 2031 (future year) with bus rapid transit and mini-bus feeder systems

== See also ==
- Accessibility (transport)
- Crush load – High passenger vehicle occupancy leading to crushing
- Forced rider
- Isochrone map
- Patronage (transportation) – Number of passengers using a service
- Passenger load factor – Capacity utilization of public transport
- Passengers per hour per direction – Measure of passenger capacity of a transportation network
- Transit desert – Area lacking in transit
- Transport divide – Unequal access to transport
