= Junfeng Jiao =

Urban Informatics Scholar

- Education: University of Washington; University of Twente; Wuhan University
- Scientific career
- Fields: Urban informatics; Smart City; Safe and Responsible AI; Agentic AI
- Workplaces: Singapore Management University

Junfeng Jiao is a Professor of Urban Informatics at Singapore Management University and a member of Meta AI Wellbeing Expert Council. He was a professor at the University of Texas at Austin, specializing in urban informatics, agentic AI and Safe and Responsible AI. He serves as a senior Fulbright Specialist on Smart Cities for the Fulbright Program. Jiao has founded the Urban Information Lab, Texas Smart Cities, and the NSF NRT Ethical AI Program. Additionally, he was a founding member and past chair of Good Systems, a University of Texas initiative dedicated to advancing safe and responsible AI technologies.

== Academic background ==
Jiao holds a Ph.D. and an M.S. degree from the University of Washington, an M.S. degree from the University of Twente, and an M.E. and a B.E. degree from Wuhan University.

== Career and research ==
Jiao's research focuses on AI, urban informatics, and smart cities with significant contributions to advancing the fields of smart city development and data-driven urban systems. Jiao is recognized for his work on shared mobility and for coining the term transit deserts. His research on the economic and health impacts of transit deserts have had further impact for policy discussions.

In recent years, Jiao has expanded his research focus into the safe and responsible use of artificial intelligence. Jiao has also worked on robot-human interactions in a pilot program of quadruped delivery robots in UT Austin.

== Projects ==
Jiao has led several major smart city initiatives focused on urban mobility, ethical roboticist training, and smart city knowledge systems. He has directed and collaborated on numerous projects funded by the National Science Foundation (NSF), including:

- Designing Smart, Sustainable Cities Through Ethical AI: As director of the NSF Research Traineeship (NRT) program at the University of Texas at Austin, Jiao oversees this initiative integrating ethical AI into urban planning.
- NRT-AI: Convergent, Responsible, and Ethical AI: This NSF-funded project (Award #2125858) examines ethical frameworks for AI applications in smart cities.
- NSF Convergence Accelerator Track J: As co-principal investigator (NSF Award #2236305), Jiao collaborates with the University of Houston to address food deserts using AI-driven solutions.
- SCC-CIVIC-PG Track A: Community Hub for Smart Mobility: This project (NSF Award #2043060) develops smart mobility strategies for urban environments.
- SCC-PG: ECET: Empowering Community Engagement with Technology: Jiao contributed to this initiative (NSF Award #1952193), analyzing correlations between air pollution spatial patterns and COVID-19 mortality rates.

His work has received funding from federal agencies such as the U.S. Department of Housing and Urban Development and the U.S. Department of Transportation, as well as municipal support from the City of Austin and private partners including MITRE Corporation, Dell, Microsoft, Nvidia, and Google.

== Publications ==
Jiao has authored over 130 peer-reviewed publications, including significant studies on AI applications in Cities, urban mobility, transit deserts, and the societal and transportation impact of shared mobility. He has also written books titled Shared Mobility and Smart Cities.
