= Forced rider =

Someone required to pay for something they don't want

A forced rider in economics is a person who is required, by public or private entities, to share in the costs of goods or services without desiring them or valuing them at their price. It is the opposite of a free rider.

== Theory ==
=== Forced riders in taxation ===
The forced rider has been cited in various authors' views concerning taxation.

- Pacifists are required to pay for national defense.
- Environmentalists may be required to pay for public works projects, such as dams, which they feel destroy natural habitats in ways they do not condone.
- Healthy and insured individuals being forced via an individual mandate to subsidize insurance for unhealthy and previously uninsured individuals. Previously uninsured individuals are now free riders.
- In many European countries, every household is required to purchase a television licence whether they watch television or not.
- Childless adults are required to pay for the public education of others' children. Additionally, parents whose children are not using the public school system, such as those enrolled in private or charter schools in the US, are still required to pay for other children's public education, as well.

=== Forced riders in private property ===
- In a unionized workplace, non-union as well as union members are required to pay dues to the union representing the workplace as a condition of employment. This is the case in agency shop union security agreements.

== See also ==
- Accessibility (transport)
- Automotive city
- Ghetto tax
- Redlining
- Transit desert
- Transport divide
