= Banking desert =

Area with limited access to banking

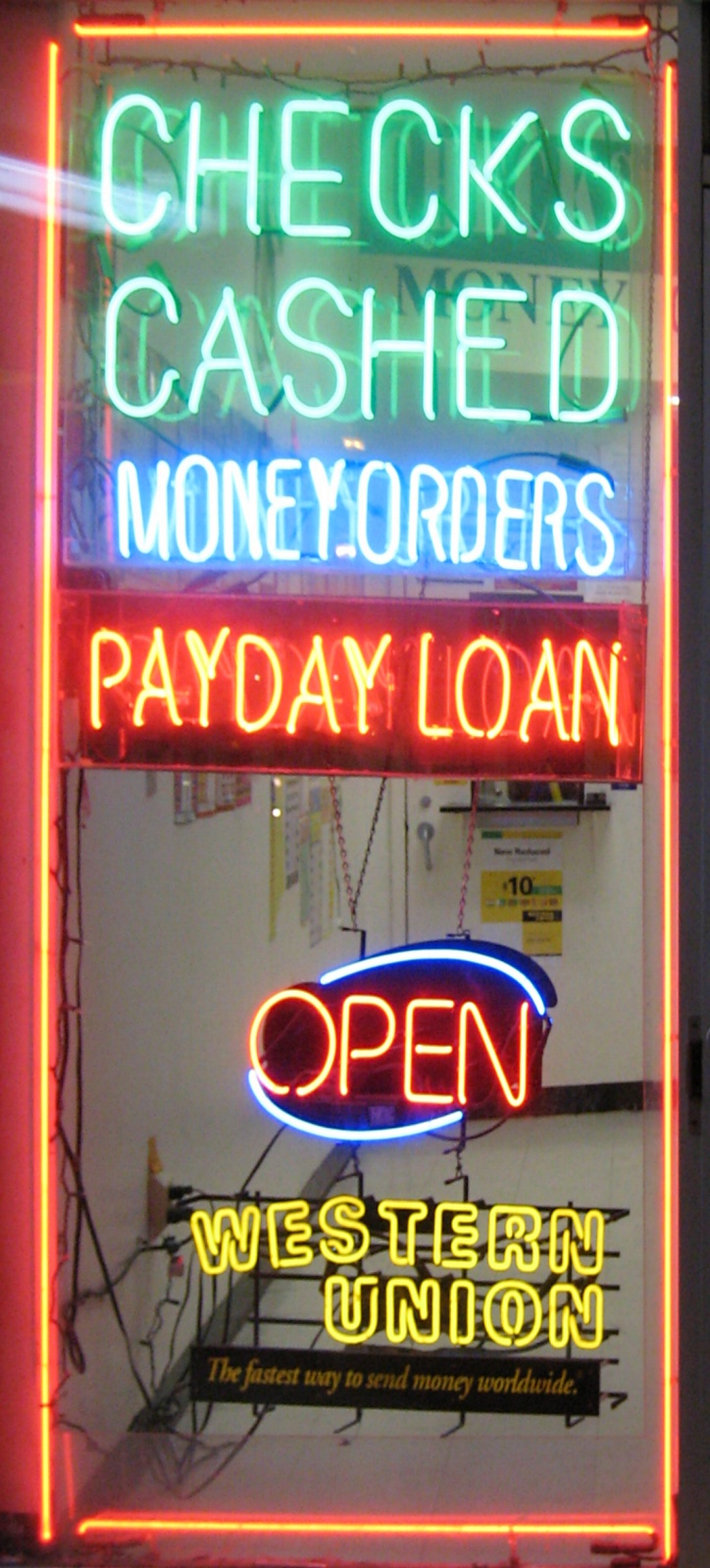
A shop window in Falls Church, Virginia, advertising payday loans

Banking deserts are areas with inadequate banking services. They are usually in rural regions as they are less populated, thus there are less profit opportunities for large banking institutions. Low-income residents and the elderly are particularly vulnerable to the problems associated with banking deserts. If basic financial services are unavailable, residents become "vulnerable to predatory lenders and pricey check cashers". In the US, banking deserts are more often found in communities of color than they are elsewhere.

== History ==
Banking deserts were mentioned as early as the 1870s, by Tullio Martello and Augusto Montanari in their book, Stato attuale del credito in Italia e notizie sulle istituzioni di credito straniere, regarding Italian unification. The term had also been used to describe the situation in Newfoundland and Labrador during the period of 1993 to 2003, when the Canadian province had lost 23% of its bank branches.

Bank deserts have been growing in the United States since the 1990s. Due to federal deregulation, mainstream banking companies were allowed to focus the most on more populated and profitable areas and close banks that didn't produce much revenue, which were usually those in low-income communities and places consisting of people of color. This made way for higher-priced alternative financial services, such as payday lenders and check-cashing stores, to occupy these areas. The number of banking branches in the United States peaked at 99,163 during the Great Recession and fell to 88,070 by 2018; major cities that have had banks close the most in non-white areas include Baltimore, Chicago, Philadelphia, Detroit and Las Vegas.

== Impact ==
It is much harder for citizens to build wealth, credit, and savings with only expensive alternative services and without a physical bank nearby. In addition, children who grow up in banking deserts are less likely to be exposed to parents and other adults using local banks for finances, increasing their chances of financial illiteracy as they grow older. A 2020 Making Sen$e piece that studied banking deserts in Native American reservations found they had very poor credit scores as a result of financial illiteracy and a lack of trust in banking.

== See also ==
- Book desert
- Food desert
- Medical desert
- Transit desert
- Underbanked

== Bibliography ==
- Einaudi, G. (2008). Rivista di storia economica. G. Einaudi.
