= Transport divide =

Unequal access to transport

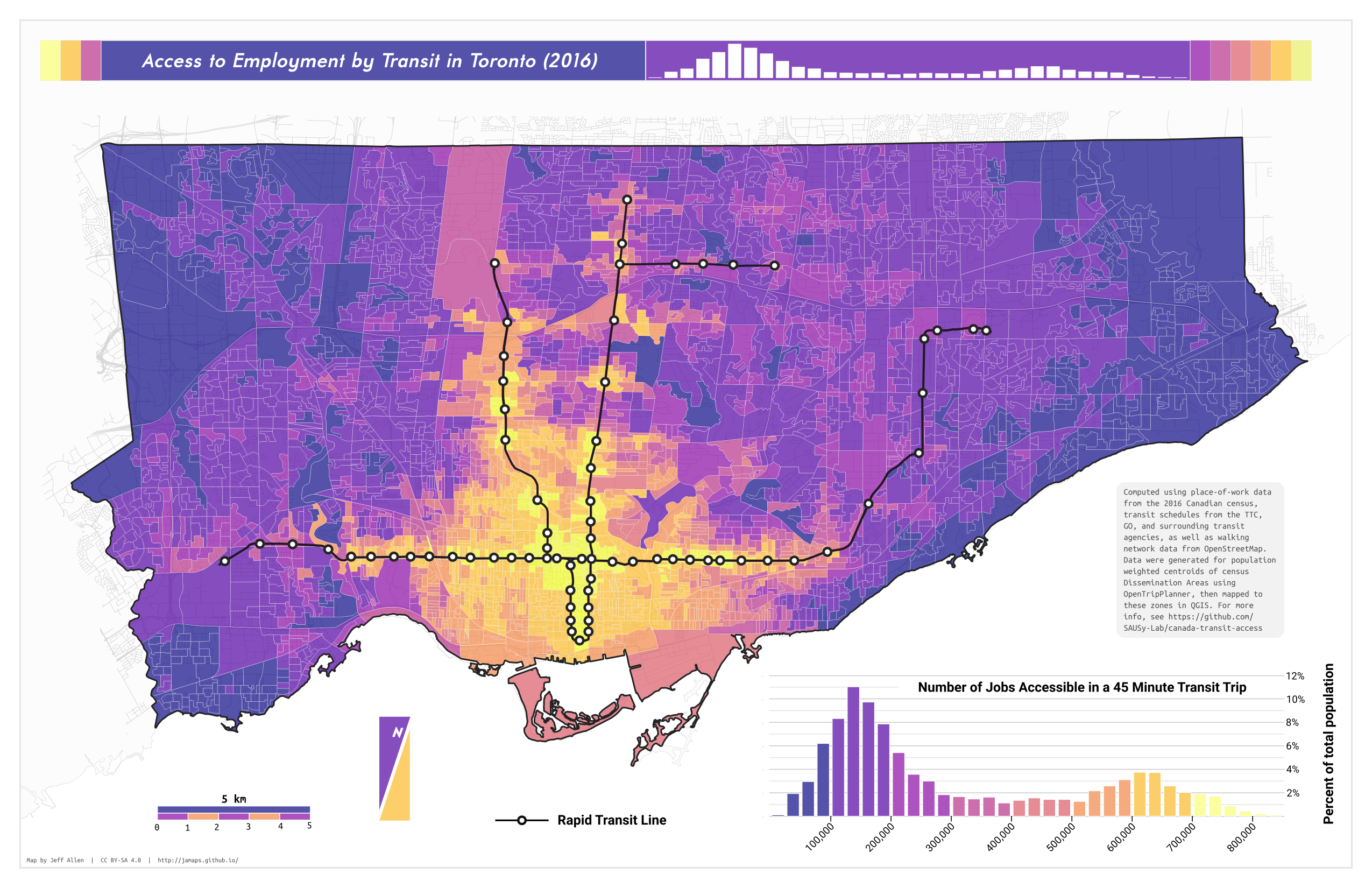
Access to jobs by public transit in Toronto

Transport divide (also known as transport exclusion, transport disadvantage, transport deprivation, transportation divide, and mobility divide) refers to unequal access to transportation. It can result in the social exclusion of disadvantaged groups.

The concept covers issues ranging from unequal access to public transportation to the unequal opportunities in global migration due to different visa policies as part of the global North–South divide.

There are a number of aspects of the transport divide. People may have difficulty in using transport system because of physical barriers, such as a lack of accessibility for the disabled (lack of wheelchair access also impacts people with baby strollers or bicycles). Insufficient labeling can also cause problems for people who do not speak the local language. Financial barriers in the form of cost of services can prevent the poor from using the transport services. Distance barriers (in the form of distance from people's homes) can make some areas mostly inaccessible to people without access to a car, particularly when local public transportation is not well developed. Time barriers include problems caused by rush hour, but also time constraints caused by the need to arrange for care for members of the family (most often childcare), which when coupled with poor transport infrastructure can be a factor in reducing women's participation in the workforce. There are also fear barriers such as fear of being groped, leading to the creation of women-only passenger cars. Attempts to fix the fear barriers through increased surveillance and policing have however been linked to the lowering of the usage of such services by other groups, such as youth.

Scholars and urban planners have proposed solutions ranging from improving public transportation and increasing accessibility, subsidizing private transportation, and changing the ways in which cities are designed to improve mobility.

== History ==
In the last 5 decades, globalization has had an impact on many urban regions. Economic restructuring has created urban economic cores with surrounding suburbs. Gentrification has forced disadvantaged individuals and households to move farther outside of the urban center, creating a need for accessible and stable transportation. This spatial and economic shift has worsened transport disadvantage.

Housing policies have had a significant impact on the transport divide and mobility. The subsidization of larger housing estates in suburban areas has created a concentration of poverty in urban areas. Subsidizing low-income housing in low-density areas creates isolated communities with limited access to transportation. It is very difficult to connect distant suburban areas through public transportation, yet low-income households struggle to have equitable access to private transportation.

=== United States ===
There has historically been a transport divide for racial minorities in the United States in the form of segregation of public transportation systems. Many buses were segregated until the 1956 Supreme Court decision, Browder v. Gayle. Other significant court cases related to segregation on public transportation are Keys v. Carolina Coach Co., Morgan v. Virginia, and Boynton v. Virginia.

In 1956, the US government passed the Interstate Highway Act, which provided funding to build thousands of miles of highways across the country. This act, along with the GI bill which provided support for veterans to become homeowners, facilitated suburbanization and urban sprawl. This made the US more car-oriented as cities became spread out and people commuted from suburbs into cities for work. This made owning a car critical for access to suburban housing and schools. This suburbanization was not limited to the US; many cities in Europe developed the same way in the 20th century.

== Public transportation ==
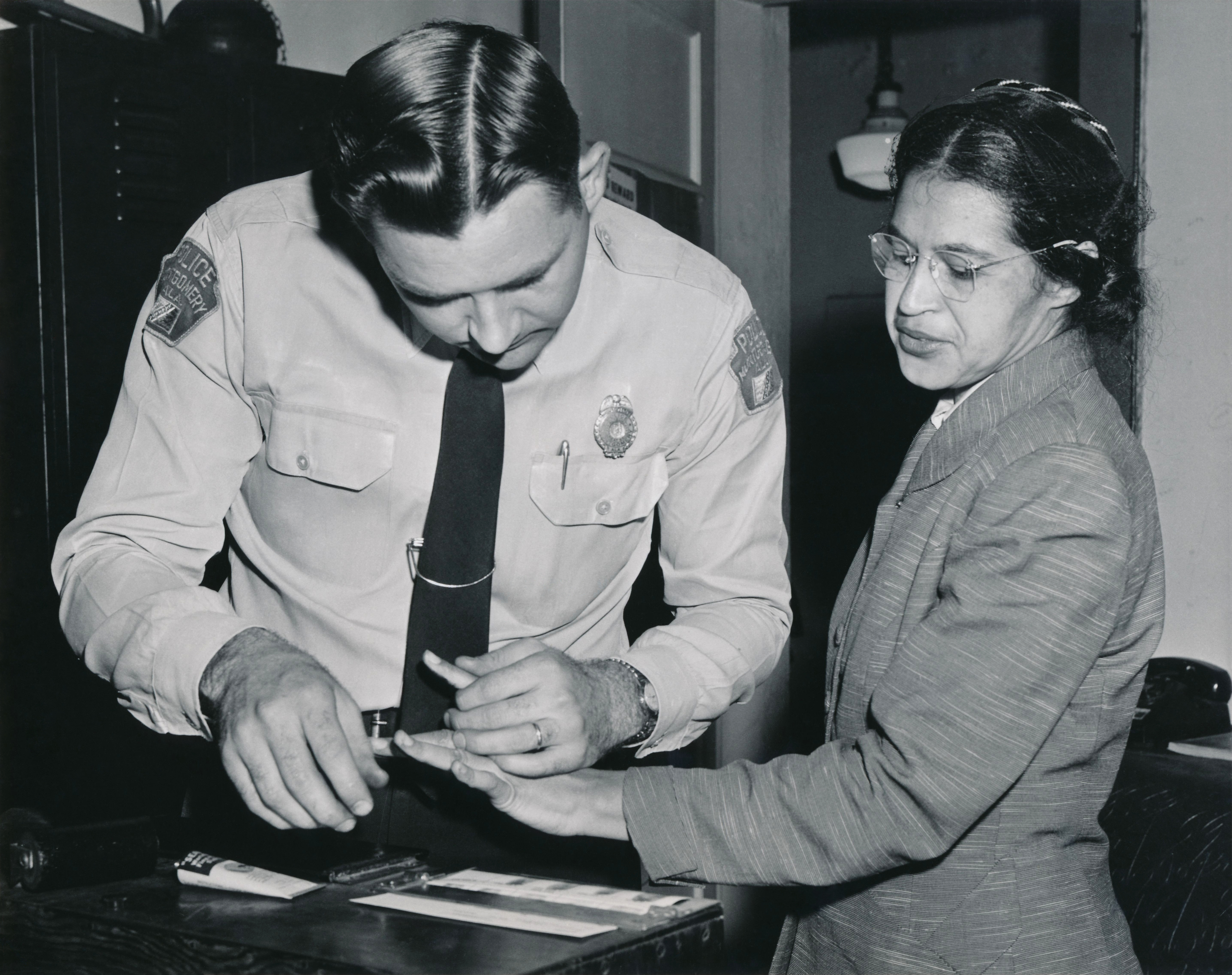
Rosa Parks being fingerprinted by Deputy Sheriff D.H. Lackey after being arrested on February 22, 1956, which started the Montgomery bus boycott

Public transportation varies widely by country, and within countries, there is also striking divides. The US, for example, has a poor public transportation system compared to many European countries. Dense cities, such as New York or D.C., have more accessible public transportation, but some cities, such as Houston, are built around cars and highways and there is a lack of accessible and efficient public transportation. Those without cars in these cities are at a disadvantage in finding and commuting to jobs. Current policy favors those in suburbs with cars rather than poorer, urban populations.

Inadequate public transportation is central to the transport divide. Public transportation provides access to employment, education, social activities, health services, food, among other necessities. Those without private transportation such as cars often rely on public transport. Yet, public transportation is often underfunded. Additionally, it may not serve all populations equitably. Those on the periphery of urban centers may struggle to find efficient public transportation if they do not live close to their places of employment.

=== Disability ===
Public transportation has traditionally not been designed for those with disabilities. The journey cycle of public transportation has several elements, such as traveling to the transit station, purchasing tickets, finding the correct service, boarding and disembarking, that often are not accessible for those with disabilities. For some disabled persons, cars are the only feasible option, which can be an additional expense and burden. Those with cars may struggle to find accessible parking or accommodations such as ramps at destinations. Accessibility to public transportation in Low and Middle Income Countries (LMIC) is especially precarious, which has significant consequences for access to health services, education, and employment. One study in Cambodia piloted a Journey Access Tool (JAT) which identifies barriers to public transportation for those with disabilities. This tool has the potential to improve discussion about barriers to transportation and increase awareness about accessibility issues.

== Private transportation ==
There has been an explosion in car ownership within the past few decades, and there are expected to be 2 billion vehicles on the road around the globe by 2030. There are many negative consequences to such widespread car ownership, such as climate change, urban sprawl, health risks, and traffic that hinders economic growth and commutes. However, the lack of a vehicle contributes to inequality, especially in car-dependent societies such as the US. Mattioli (2014) describes two types of transport disadvantage: those who lack a car and those for whom car ownership is a significant burden (forced car ownership). Those in the bottom half of income distributions are the most affected by car ownership as a significant portion of their income is allocated to purchasing and maintaining vehicles. The cost of car ownership is often underestimated; car insurance, registration fees, parking, gas, and repairs contribute to this heavy burden of ownership. The bottom quintile of income in the US spent about 34% of their annual income on transportation. This type of disadvantage has also been referred to as "forced" car ownership as it creates a significant burden for households yet they require a car to remain employed or engage in other necessary activities.

There are many external costs to widespread car usage and automobile dependency. These costs to society include noise pollution, air pollution, climate change, congestion, and automobile accidents.

Black and Latino individuals in the US have lower rates of car ownership, and car ownership is associated with increased access to employment, higher salaries, and decreased ethnic disparities in unemployment rates. One study in LA found that car ownership increased employment by 9%. It is difficult to commute on public transportation from urban centers to suburban job opportunities, which reduces employment opportunities for those in urban areas without cars.

== Global mobility divide ==
Visa waiver policies have changed in the last 5 decades as globalization and technological innovation has increased ease of mobility. However, those from OECD and wealthy countries have more mobility rights and higher access to visa waivers than those from less wealthy countries. This has created a "global mobility divide" as citizens of certain countries of more mobility rights than others. Shachar (2009) uses the term "birthright lottery" to refer to how one's ability to move throughout the world is determined by one's country of birth.

== Rural concerns ==
The vast majority of rural communities do not have any transportation alternatives whatsoever. People in rural communities may not be able to drive for many reasons, including age, disability, and socioeconomic status. However, "mobility remains a vital part of the well-being of rural-living, older adults and transportation disadvantaged persons." Transportation is essential to daily life as every person must leave their home at one point or another to go to work, grocery shop, visit the doctor, or go to school. This noted, there are countless people left trying to get a ride because they can not get somewhere themselves. This places a large burden on individuals as people resort to informal networks to get around. Informal networks may include people taking out unofficial loans from friends and family to purchase a vehicle or carpooling with a coworker or neighbor. For many people, however, these informal networks are the only option as car payments are high and rural communities are not walkable. This burden impacts the quality of everyday life of the individual as well as everyone involved.

Access to vehicles and public transportation is linked to neighborhood satisfaction. When an individual can navigate the place they get around on their own, they are more likely to enjoy living there. For example, cars make it easier for people to spend time with their friends and families. Rural and suburban areas make it hard for people without a car to get around. A Boston mother involved in a 2010 study on transportation access was quoted saying, "How am I going to get from here to the doctor's today? I don't have money for a bus, which is an hour-and-a-half walk. And if it's pouring rain and cold, with two babies, you can't walk an hour to the bus stop anyway." Stress involving transportation is higher for people in rural communities. People with vehicles are 1.6 times more satisfied with their neighborhoods than those without cars.

In rural communities, people who lack access to a vehicle are more likely to skip doctor's appointments. Transportation is a social determinant of health, meaning that the inability to afford transportation correlates to negative health outcomes. While programs like Medicaid and others have attempted to combat this issue, there are millions of uninsured Americans who can not access these services as a result. Some rural communities have instituted transportation services that combine ride-share and shuttle practices to serve older adults and disadvantaged persons. Project TRIP (Transporting Residents with Innovative Practices) began in 2015 in a rural area of North Carolina. It is privately funded and "provides free individualized transportation to health care appointments, pharmacies, grocery stores/food banks, and other places that support health and well-being." The program lifted some of the financial burdens off of these people's shoulders as well as allowed them to attend important medical appointments without stress. Programs like TRIP have seen positive outcomes for rural residents, however, funding remains a concern for many.

== Effects ==
Transport disadvantage is strongly associated with increased social exclusion (measured by factors such as income, political participation, social support) and decreased wellbeing. Transport disadvantage can also hurt wellbeing by limiting access to resources and social services. It also hinders relationships and feelings of community, which are very significant to wellbeing. Socially disadvantaged neighborhoods are more likely to have transport disadvantages. Another effect of transport disadvantage is increased exposure to traffic, which has risks through air pollution and car crashes. Racial and ethnic minorities are more likely to live in areas with more congestion and experience negative health effects. Such patterns and disparities are referred to as environmental racism. One study in Australia found that transport disadvantage is associated with an increased perception of crime in a neighborhood, worsened physical and mental health, less engagement in civic and social activities, and lower overall wellbeing.

Transport disadvantage affects populations disparately. The quality of life of elderly populations is very dependent on access to transportation as transportation allows for social interaction and hobbies.

Because of the COVID-19 pandemic, another dimension of the transport divide is health risk. Those who can travel in private cars are at less risk for contracting COVID-19, compared to those who only have access to public transportation. Additionally, those with disabilities may have increased vulnerability to COVID-19 in addition to experiencing more barriers to accessing transportation. This pandemic made using transportation more difficult for those with disabilities by disruption to safe and stable transport, lack of communication about updates to public transport, and lack of assistance.

== Potential solutions ==
Funding for public transportation has been placed on the back burner. Transportation officials gathered together at the National Conference on Rural Public and Intercity Bus Transportation in 2016 to discuss an array of transportation concerns. Their main goal was to achieve an understanding of the research and policy needs related to rural transit for older people and the transportation disadvantaged. In order to gauge opinions on the topic, a survey was distributed to attendees. Most felt that the government was not doing enough to adequately address the needs of older adults and disadvantaged persons. In response to this issue, many felt that the public and private sectors should work together to fund transportation alternatives in rural communities.

Some countries have public aid programs that subsidize cars for poor households. However, there is criticism over these programs because of environmental concerns as well concerns about defunding public transportation. Other scholars proposed technological solutions, such as a demand responsive virtual transport market in rural communities. Some urban planners advocate for denser, mixed-use city neighborhoods that are more people friendly with more public transportation and less traffic.

One solution to car-related transport disadvantage is providing and encouraging use of alternative forms of transportation. Biking and walking can be encouraged through campaigns or bike sharing initiatives, but these campaigns are fairly limited to more compact cities. The car-free movement aims to reduce the centrality of car usage in society through urban planning and public transportation. New urbanism, smart growth, and transit-oriented development are three approaches that aim to make cities more walkable, increase urban density, reduce suburban sprawl, and decrease the transport divide. These sustainability-focused movements hope to improve options for housing, employment, and transportation for more equitable societies.

Ride-hailing apps such as Uber and Lyft are on the rise, especially in urban and suburban areas. In recent years these companies have attempted to expand in rural areas but are dealing with the reality that these areas have lower population densities and longer travel distances. Startups and other tech companies have begun to emerge to combat this issue. May Mobility, an Ann Arbor, Michigan-based autonomous vehicle company is striving toward a greener, innovative future. May Mobility's goal of providing free, shared rides to people is an active solution for people facing the plight of transportation access.

Public transportation in transport-deprived areas can improve mobility, economic opportunity, reduce household costs, and generally improve communities. Some scholars argue that investing more in public transportation only helps those who are transport disadvantaged if public transportation is targeted at specific groups and provides flexible services. Transportation is essential to the livelihood of all people; everyone needs transportation. It is a universal issue that policymakers may be able to find common ground on should it become a larger issue.

== Spaceflight ==
Since the beginning of the Space Age countries other than the countries with the most developed spaceflight capabilities have argued that space is for everyone and the access to it should not be controlled by those who have the capabilities to go there.

Additionally New Space entrepreneurs have argued in favour of companies to establish humanity as multiplanetary species, which has been criticized for being an escapist mission, limited to few, based on unknown criteria and offering escape as a solution to the problems on Earth instead of working on the problems.

== See also ==
- 15-minute city
- Digital divide
- Complete communities
- Exurb
- Fenceline community – Community bordering harmful industry or effects
- Food desert
- Forced displacement
- Forced rider
- Freedom Riders
- Freedom of movement
- Urban resilience

Transport:

- Accessibility (transport)
- Automobile dependency – Concept that city layouts favor automobiles over other modes of transportation
- Bicycle monarchy – Informal style of monarchy in Scandinavia and the Low Countries
- Bicycle poverty reduction
- Dollar van – Mode of transport which falls between both taxicabs and buses
- Isochrone map
- Mobility aid
- Palestinian freedom of movement
- Pedaling to Freedom

Transit:

- Free public transport
- Montgomery bus boycott – 1950s American protest against racial segregation
- Public transportation
- Public transport accessibility level – Measure of access to public transport
- San Francisco tech bus protests – Protests over private buses using public stops
- Share taxi – Mode of transport which falls between both taxicabs and buses
- Transit desert – Area lacking in transit
- Transport economics
- With My Own Two Wheels
- List of urban transit advocacy organizations
