= Fenceline community =

Community bordering harmful industry or effects

A fenceline community or frontline community is a neighborhood that is immediately adjacent to a company, military base, industrial or service center and is directly affected by the noise, odors, chemical emissions, traffic, parking, or operations of the company. These communities are exposed to hazardous chemicals, high pollution levels, and environmental degradation along with the threat of chemical explosions.

Many fenceline communities are situated in sacrifice zones that are disproportionately inhabited by people of color, Indigenous communities, and the working poor.

== Background ==
As a result of exposure to hazardous materials and emissions, fenceline communities experience higher rates and risk of cancer and respiratory challenges. Fenceline communities also face additional health and socioeconomic issues such as poor housing infrastructure, lack of access to nutritious and non-toxic food, and higher rates of diseases, along with the increase stress and challenges that result from unemployment, poverty, crime, and racism. Climate change-induced extreme weather events and natural disasters place fenceline communities at risk of a high level of exposure to toxic emissions from facility explosions and chemical leaks.

Fenceline communities "fear that it may jeopardize jobs and economic survival" to organize to reduce their exposure to hazardous waste." Additionally, residents in fenceline communities are often unable to relocate. This is because the large industries adjacent to residential communities often produce effects that dramatically lower the property value of these homes. Therefore, residents are unable to sell their homes for a value that would be high enough for them to purchase property elsewhere.

An example of a fenceline community is the African American Diamond community in Norco, Louisiana. This community lived on the fenceline of a Shell plant.

== Solutions ==
Examples of actions that can minimize the negative impact a nearby company has on a fenceline community include, greater education and information sharing between companies and communities, improved safety regulations, health-impact assessments, and increased monitoring, reporting, and reduction of toxic emissions. Communities also organize against adjacent company's and advocate for their standard of living. However, fenceline communities can face barriers in doing so as they often "do not have the social or financial resources to mitigate their exposures."

== See also ==
- Cancer Alley
- Environmental dumping
- Environmental justice
- Environmental racism
- Environmental racism in the United States
- Line source
- Locally unwanted land use
- Low-emission zone
- Mobile source air pollution – Air pollution emitted by motor vehicles, airplanes, locomotives, and other engines
  - Exhaust gas – Gases emitted as a result of fuel reactions in combustion engines
- NIMBY
- Sacrifice zone
- Transport divide – Unequal access to transport
