= Book desert =

Geographic area where books are hard to find

A book desert is a geographic area (country, state, county, city, neighborhood, home) where printed books and other reading material are relatively hard to obtain, particularly without access to an automobile or other form of transportation. Some researchers have defined book deserts by linking them to poverty and low income, while others use a combination of factors that include census data, income, ethnicity, geography, language, and the number of books in a home.

The term "book desert" came into regular use in the mid-2010s when the social enterprise Unite for Literacy, coined the term.

Unite for Literacy suggests that planting and growing "Book Gardens" is one way to eradicate book deserts. Initiatives that increase the availability of books by such measures as bookmobiles and librarians on bicycles have been offered as possible solutions to book deserts, as have Little Free Libraries and offering children's literature available online, free of charge.

== Background and research ==
In the past, researchers have studied how the absence or scarcity of books impact how a child's early literacy and language skills develop. Unite for Literacy created an operational definition of a book desert when they published the U.S. Book Desert Map: A geographic area (country, state, county, census tract) where it is predicted that a majority of homes have less than 100 printed books. In March 2014, James LaRue, director of the American Library Association's Office for Intellectual Freedom and the Freedom to Read Foundation, used the term in an issue of American Libraries, where he described the term as applying to houses with 25 or fewer books in them and discussed ways to lessen or eradicate the problem.

In July 2016, professors Susan B. Neuman and Naomi Moland published a study in Urban Education, where they examined how the lack of printed reading material among low-income and poverty stricken neighborhoods impacts early childhood development and used the term to describe areas and homes with little access to written materials. This study built upon other research Neuman had conducted in 2001. The researchers found few stores in Detroit, Los Angeles, and Washington, D.C. The focus areas of their research was print resources for children ages 0 to 18. Of those stores, many were dollar stores.

In 2016, The Atlantic reported that in 2015, Neuman and JetBlue Airways held an experiment to foster literacy, by providing book vending machines in a low-income Washington, D.C. neighborhood. Over 20,000 books were given away, prompting Neuman to conclude that the neighborhood's parents did care about their children's education, but lacked "the resources to enable their children to be successful."

=== Contributing factors ===
Multiple factors are credited as contributing to the formation of book deserts, the most frequently highlighted of which tends to be poverty and low income. Other factors tend to include language and geography, as some areas lack access to bookstores or public or community school libraries that would provide books. Book store closures due to bankruptcy or other financial difficulties are also occasionally cited as a contributing factor, when the closure leaves the area without a bookseller.

== Map ==
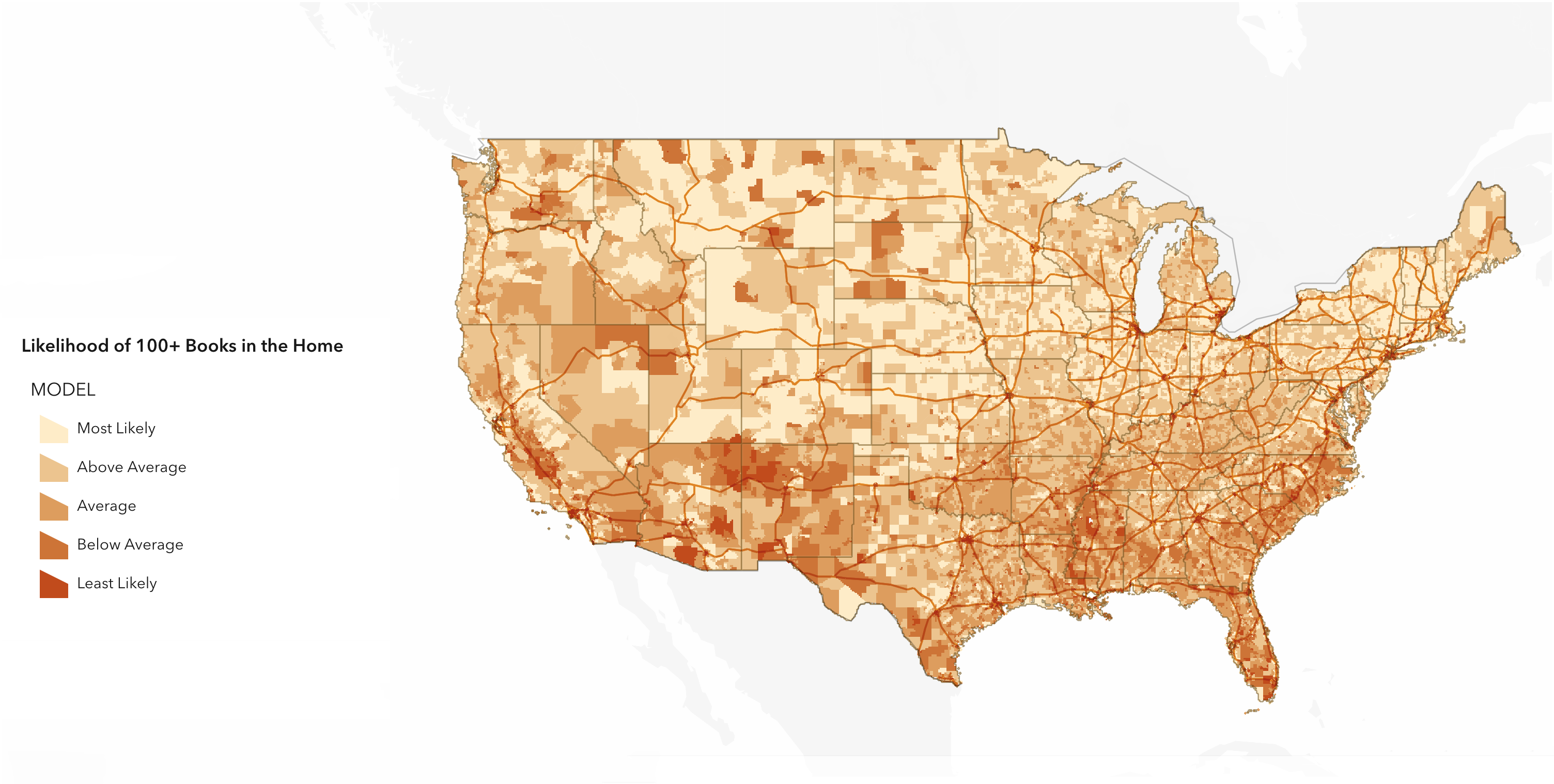
A 2023 US Book Desert map, from Unite for Literacy

Unite for Literacy developed a book desert map of the United States powered by Esri's ArcGIS platform, which provides a visual presentation of the lack of books in the nation, states, counties and census tracts. To create the map, Unite for Literacy performed a statistical analyses of data from National Assessment of Educational Progress (NAEP) and the U.S. Census Bureau American Community Survey, including the number of books in 4th graders' homes, average community income, ethnic diversity, geographic location and home language. Unite for Literacy unveiled the map during the Clinton Global Initiative America (CGI America) meeting held in Denver, Colorado, in June 2014.

In 2023, Unite for Literacy worked with the Colorado State University Geospatial Centroid to refine the book desert map. The Centroid team compiled and analyzed data from NAEP, the Census Bureau, and Diversity Data Kids, along with survey responses from more than 10,000 participants in the Unite for Literacy’s Growing Readers program. The new map more consistently and accurately identifies how likely households within census tracts are to have an abundance of books when compared to other tracts.

== See also ==
- Banking desert
- Books for the Blind
- Books to Prisoners
- Food deserts in the United States
