= Units of measurement in transportation =

Ways of measuring the transport of goods and people

The units of measurement in transportation describes the unit of measurement used to express various transportation quantities, as used in statistics, planning, and their related applications.

== Transportation quantity ==
The currently popular units are:

=== Length of journey ===
- kilometre (km) or kilometer is a metric unit used, outside the US, to measure the length of a journey;
- the international statute mile (mi) is used in the US; 1 mi = 1.609344 km
- nautical mile is rarely used to derive units of transportation quantity.

=== Traffic flow ===
- vehicle-kilometre (vkm) as a measure of traffic flow, determined by multiplying the number of vehicles on a given road or traffic network by the average length of their trips measured in kilometres.
- vehicle-mile (vehicle miles traveled, or VMT) same as before but measures the trip expressed in miles.

== Passenger ==
=== Payload quantity ===
- Passenger; Person (often abbreviated as either "pax" or "p." or No.)

=== Passenger-distance ===
Passenger-distance is the distance (km or miles) travelled by passengers on transit vehicles; determined by multiplying the number of unlinked passenger trips by the average length of their trips.

- passenger-kilometre or pkm internationally;
- passenger-mile (or pmi ?) sometimes in the US; 1 pmi = 1.609344 pkm

=== Passengers per hour per direction ===
Passengers per hour per direction (pphpd) measures the maximum route capacity of a transport system.

=== Passengers per bus hour ===
A system may carry a high number of passengers per distance (km or mile) but a relatively low number of passengers per bus hour if vehicles operate in congested areas and thus travel at slower speed.

=== Passengers per bus distance ===
A transit system serving a community with a widely dispersed population must operate circuitous routes that tend to carry fewer passengers per distance (km or mile). A higher number is more favorable.

== Freight ==
Freight is measured in mass-distance. A simple unit of freight is the kilogram-kilometre (kgkm), the service of moving one kilogram of payload a distance of one kilometre.

=== Payload quantity ===
- kilogram (kg), the standard SI unit of mass.
- tonne (t), a non-SI but an accepted metric unit, defined as 1,000 kilograms.
- "short ton" is used in the US; 1 short ton = 2,000 pounds = 0.907 tonnes.

1 t = (1/0.907) short tons = 1.102 short tons.

=== Payload-distance ===
- kilogram-kilometre (kg⋅km), moving 1 kg of cargo a distance of 1 km;
- tonne-kilometre or kilometre-tonne (t⋅km or km⋅t, also tkm or kmt), the transportation of one tonne over one kilometre; 1 tkm = 1,000 kgkm.
- ton-mile in the US: 1 ton-mile * ( 0.907185 t / short ton) * ( 1.609344 km / mile ) = 1.460 tkm

=== Usage ===
The metric units (pkm and tkm) are used internationally. (In aviation where United States customary units are widely used, the International Air Transport Association (IATA) releases its statistics in the metric units.)

In the US, sometimes United States customary units are used.

=== Derivation ===
The dimension of the measure is the product of the payload mass and the distance transported.

=== Example ===
A semi truck traveling from Los Angeles to Chicago (approximate distance 2,015 miles) carrying 14 short tons of cargo delivers a service of 14 * 2,015 = 28,210 ton-miles of freight (equal to about 41,187 tkm).

=== Intermodal containers ===
Intermodal container traffic is commonly measured in twenty-foot equivalent units (TEUs), rather than cargo weight, e.g. a TEU-km would be the equivalent of one twenty-foot container transported one kilometer.

== Transportation density ==
Transportation density can be defined as the payload per period, say passenger / day or tonne / day. This can be used as the measure of intensity of the transportation on a particular section or point of transportation infrastructure, say road or railway. This can be used in comparison with the construction, running costs of the infrastructure.

== Fatalities by VMT ==
Fatalities by VMT (vehicle miles traveled) is a unit for assessing road traffic fatalities. This metric is computed by dividing the fatalities by the estimated VMT.

Usually, transport risk is computed by reference to the distance traveled by people, while for road traffic risk, only vehicle traveled distance is usually taken into account.

In the United States, the unit is used as an aggregate in yearly federal publications, while its usage is more sporadic in other countries. For instance, it appears to compare different kind of roads in some publications as it had been computed on a five-year period between 1995 and 2000.

In the United States, it is computed per 100 million miles traveled, while internationally it is computed in 100 million or 1 billion kilometers traveled.

According to the Minnesota Department of Public Safety, Office of Traffic Safety

Volume of traffic, or vehicle miles traveled (VMT), is a predictor of crash incidence. All other things being equal, as VMT increases, so will traffic crashes. The relationship may not be simple, however; after a point, increasing congestion leads to reduced speeds, hanging the proportion of crashes that occur at different severity levels.

== Energy efficiency ==
Energy efficiency in transport can be measured in L/100 km or miles per gallon (mpg). This can be normalized per vehicle, as in fuel economy in automobiles, or per seat, as for example in fuel economy in aircraft.

== History ==
MacNeal 1994 discusses the history of this topic, exploring such units and how humans developed the current state of logically recognizing and naming them.

== See also ==
- Available seat miles
- Passenger load factor
- List of countries by rail usage
