= Passengers per hour per direction =

Measure of passenger capacity of a transportation network

Passengers per hour per direction (p/h/d), also known as passengers per hour in peak direction (pphpd) and corridor capacity, is a measure of the route capacity of a rapid transit or public transport system.

== Definition ==
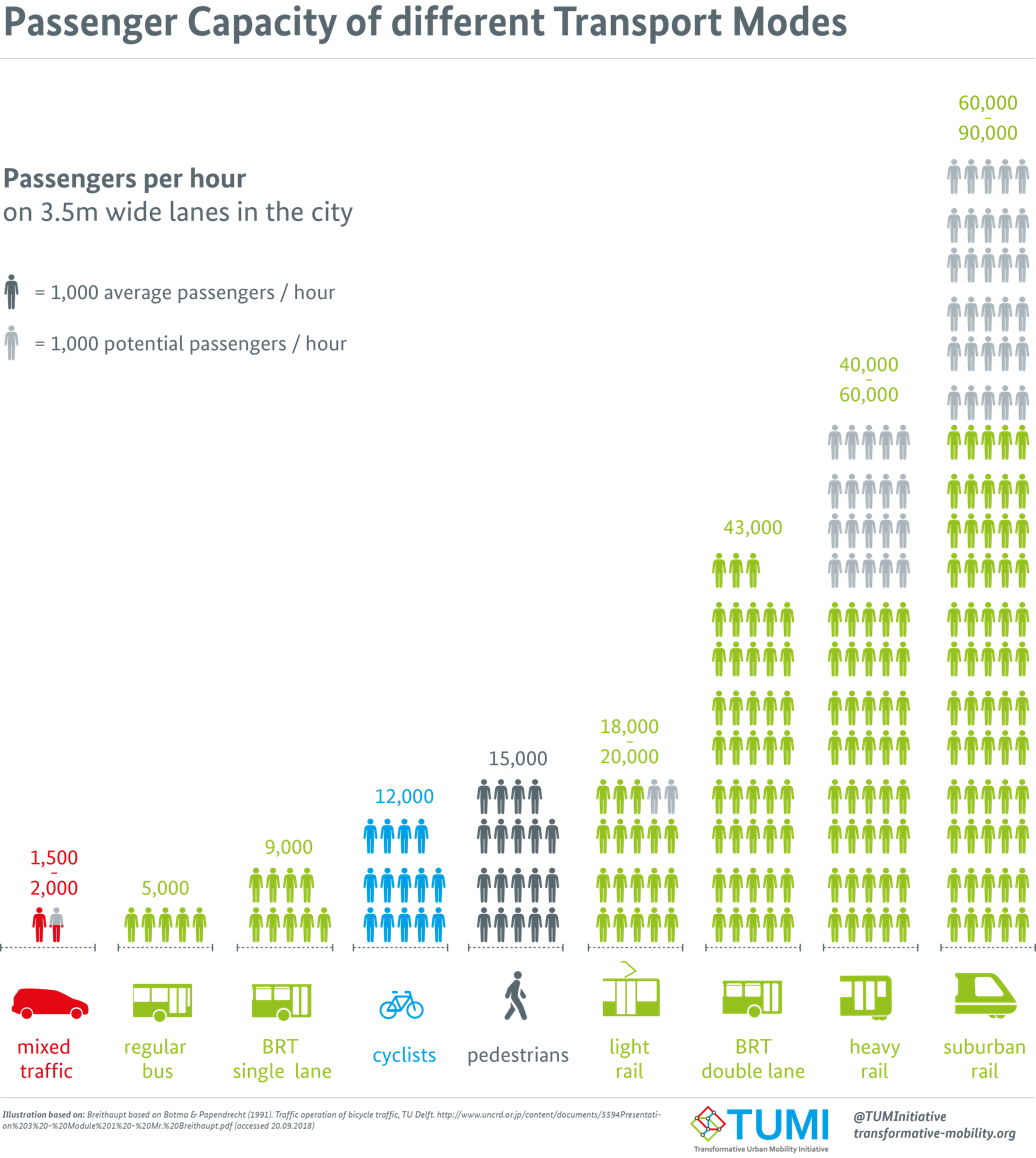
Comparative passenger capacity per hour of various modes of transport

The corridor capacity in the passenger transport field refers to the maximum number of people who can be safely and comfortably transported per unit of time over a certain way with a defined width. The corridor capacity does not measure the number of vehicles which can be transported over such way, since the nuclear objective of passenger mobility is to transport passengers, not vehicles.

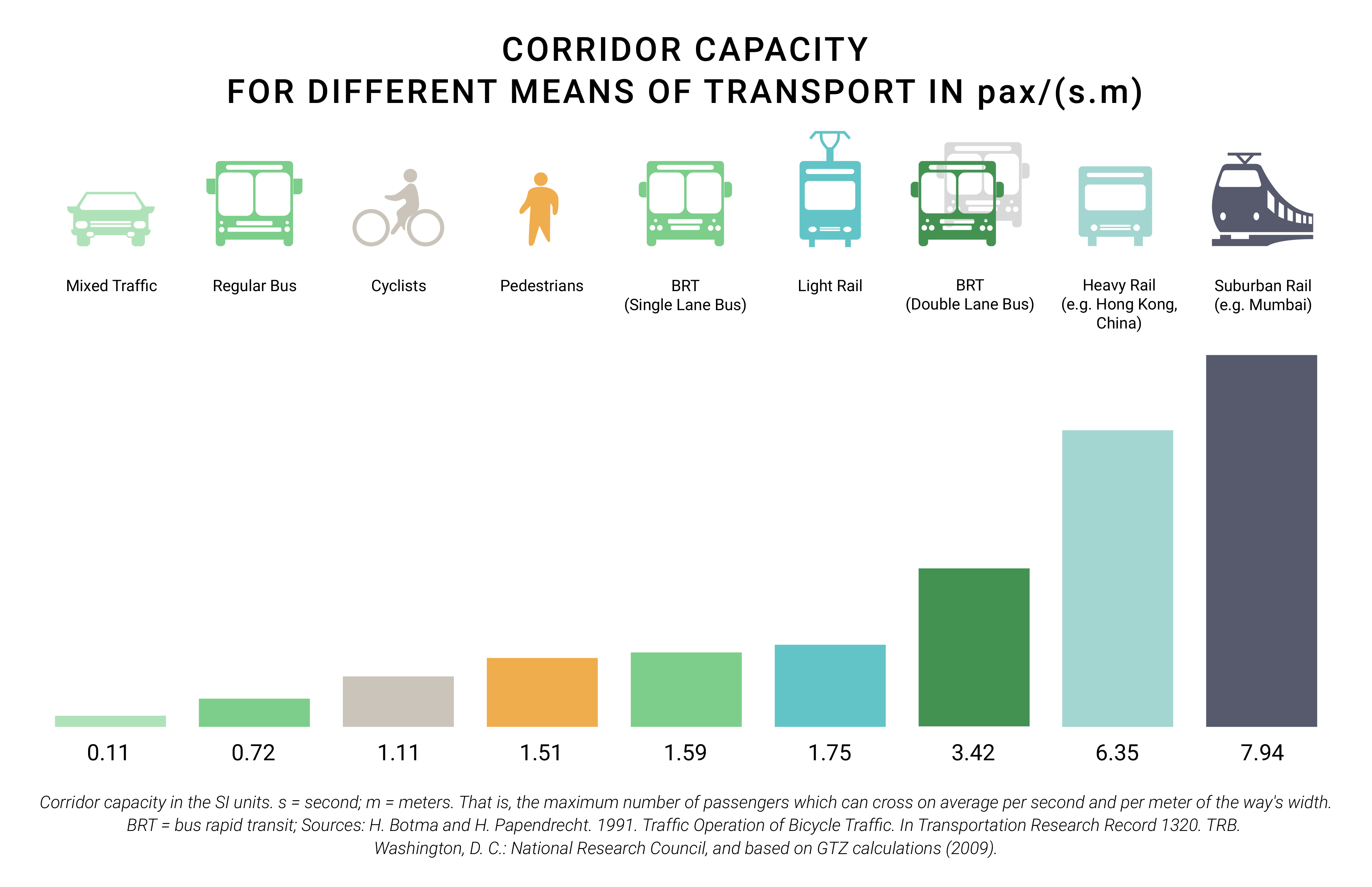
Corridor capacity in pax/(s·m)

In terms of quantities defined within the International System of Units, the corridor capacity may be measured in units of $\mathrm{s}^{-1}\cdot \mathrm{m}^{-1}$, i.e., the maximum number of passengers per second per meter of the corridor's width. An approximately equivalent concept in physics is volumetric flux.

== Directional flow ==
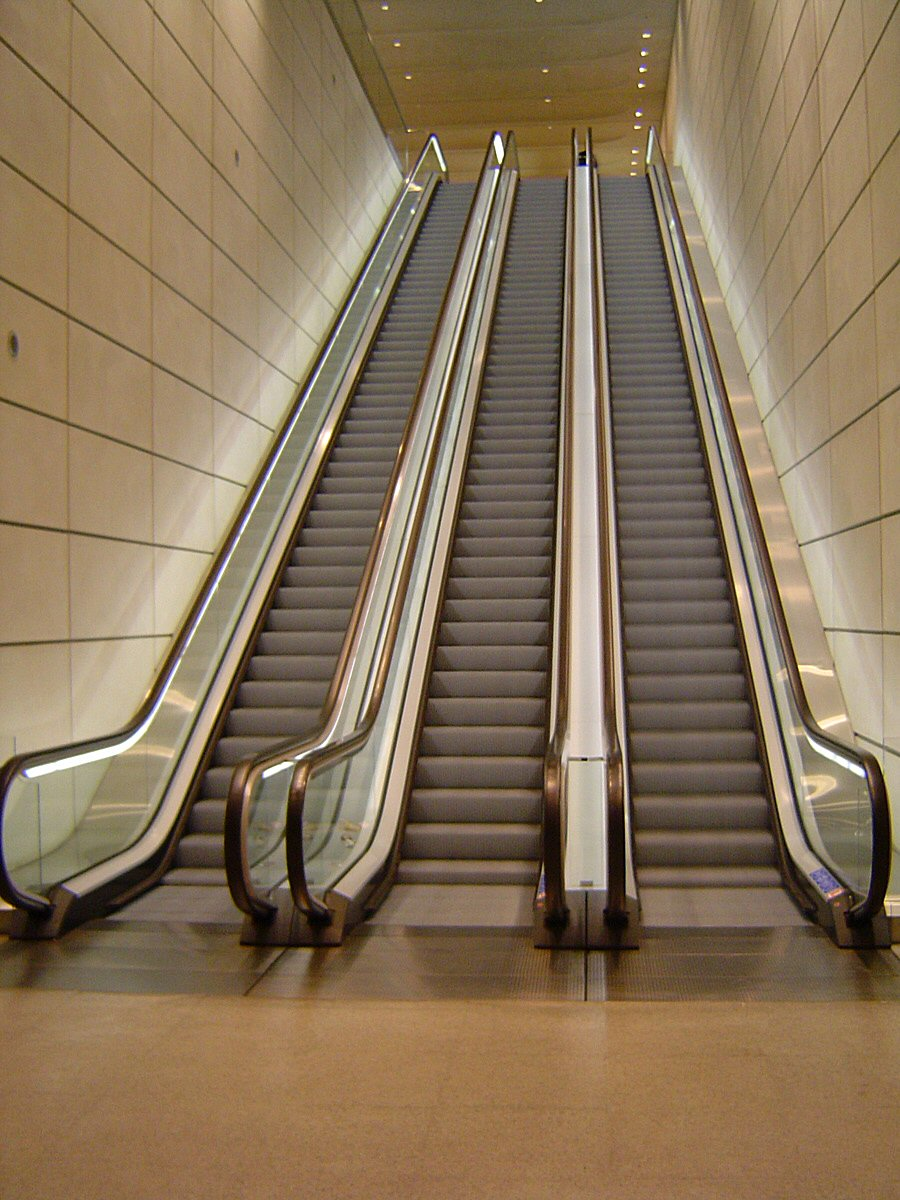
Three parallel escalators; the direction of the middle escalator can be changed to double capacity in one direction (↑↑↓ or ↑↓↓).

Many public transport systems handle a high directional flow of passengers— often traveling to work in a city in the morning rush hour and away from the said city in the late afternoon. To increase the passenger throughput, many systems can be reconfigured to change the direction of the optimized flow. A common example is a railway or metro station with more than two parallel escalators, where the majority of the escalators can be set to move in one direction. This gives rise to the measure of peak-flow rather than a simple average of half of the total capacity.

== See also ==
- Annual average daily traffic – Measurement of how many vehicles travel on a certain road
- Patronage (transportation) – Number of passengers using a service
  - Crush load – High passenger vehicle occupancy leading to crushing
  - Headway – Distance between vehicles in a transit system measured in time or space
  - Passenger load factor – Capacity utilization of public transport
- Traffic flow – Study of interactions between travellers and infrastructure
  - Traffic congestion – Transport condition characterized by slower speed and high density
- Urban planning – Technical process of land use and urban design
