= Crush load =

High passenger vehicle occupancy leading to crushing

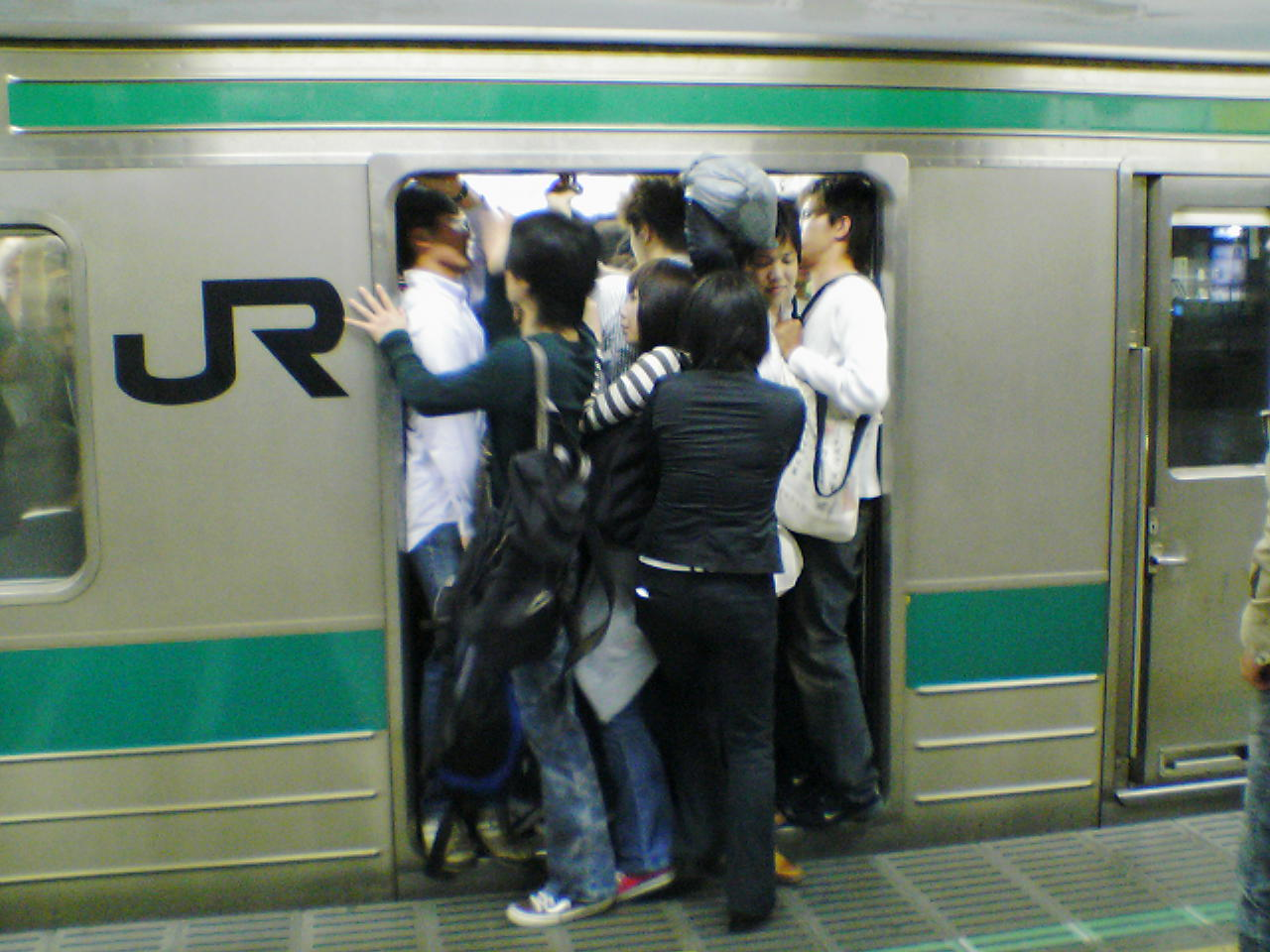
Crush load on a crowded train in Japan

A crush load is a level of passenger loading in a transport vehicle which is so high that passengers are "crushed" against one another. It represents an extreme form of passenger loading, and normally considered to be representative of a system with serious capacity limitations. Crush loads result from too many passengers within a vehicle designed for a much smaller number. Crush loaded trains or buses are so heavily loaded that for most passengers physical contact with several other nearby passengers is impossible to avoid.

== Definition ==
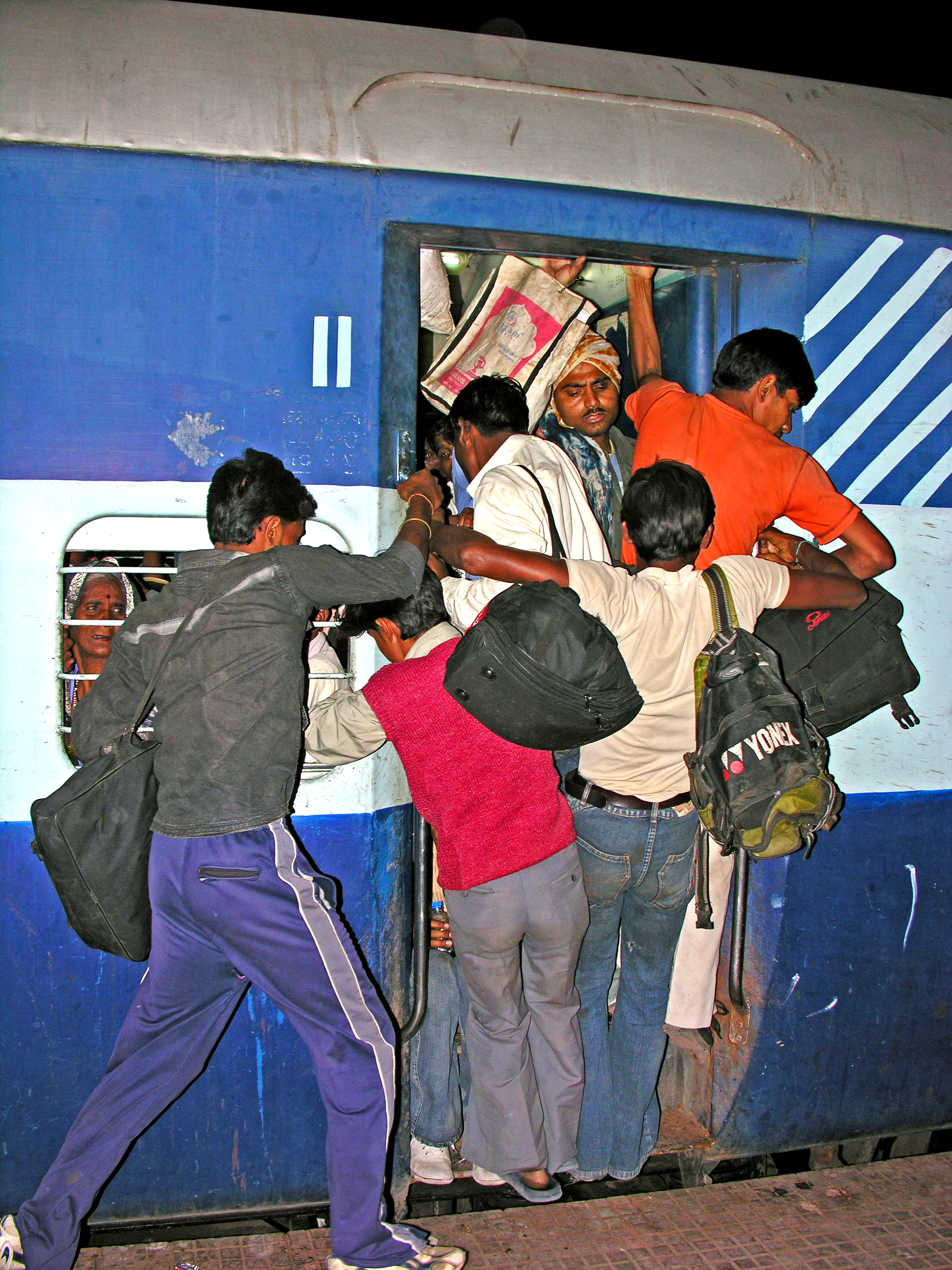
Crush load on a crowded Indian Railways train

In the context of transport economics and planning, crush load refers to the maximum level of passenger load for a particular vehicle or rail carriage. Crush loads are calculated for the number of passengers per unit area, standing up.

Crush loads are not an issue for passengers that are seated, as passengers will not normally sit on one another.

Crush loads are most common on city buses and rail metro systems, where passenger loading is high, and most passengers stand. Airlines almost never have crush loads, nor do high speed and/or long-distance rail or long-distance bus routes, where all passengers are generally seated.

Crush loads are normally measured using number of standing passengers per 1 square metre (1.2 sq yd). Six passengers per square metre is often considered the practical limit on what can be accepted without serious discomfort to passengers. However, severe crush loads can be much in excess of this. Before the 1965–1982 Commuting Five Directions Operation (ja:通勤五方面作戦) project undertaken by Japanese National Railways (JNR) on five trunk railway lines serving the Greater Tokyo Area, crush load peak ridership on said lines regularly exceeded 200% to 300%^{[a]} of each line's optimal route capacity. During the same period of time, many of Japan's subway lines in operation also saw similar overcrowding levels, which was similarly only ameliorated by building new extra lines. Similar issues continue to persist on the Seoul Metropolitan Subway system in South Korea, in particular Line 2, Line 9 and Gimpo Goldline, where, especially due to the shorter train formations operated on the latter two lines, they are popularly nicknamed "hell trains".

In India, the term "super dense crush load" has been coined by railway officials to describe passenger loads on peak-hour trains operating on the Mumbai Suburban Railway when carriages built for 200 passengers carry over 500, translating to 14–16 people per square metre; not accounting for the many passengers who have no choice but to hitch onto overcrowded moving trains out of necessity.

== Effects ==
Crush loads in transport vehicles can result in many secondary issues, such as petty theft and pickpocketing, extreme discomfort for passengers, sexual harassment, and an inability for passengers to board and alight vehicles in a timely manner.

For a rail vehicle which has a crush load, passengers are touching and there is no space for another passenger to enter without causing serious discomfort to the passengers on board. According to Hoel et al. in Transportation Infrastructure Engineering, operating at crush load increases dwell time (the length of time the transport vehicle remains in the station or stop) and reduces overall vehicle capacity per unit of time.

Large dense concentrations of passengers can create dangerous conditions, both within transit vehicles and at overcrowded stations. In 2014, a news service in Mumbai, India reported several serious platform gap mutilation incidents and a death within a few months, mostly attributed to crowded conditions.

== See also ==
- Headway – Distance between vehicles in a transit system measured in time or space
- Passenger load factor – Capacity utilization of public transport
- Passenger car (rail)
- Passenger pusher
- Route capacity – Maximum occupancy of a route in a given time
- Seating capacity – Number of people who can be seated in a specific space

== Notes ==
a. Crowding levels defined by the Ministry of Land, Infrastructure, Transport and Tourism:

100% — Commuters have enough personal space and are able to take a seat or stand while holding onto the straps or hand rails.
150% — Commuters have enough personal space to read a newspaper.
180% — Commuters must fold newspapers to read.
200% — Commuters are pressed against each other in each compartment but can still read small magazines.
250% — Commuters are pressed against each other, unable to move.
