= Ridership =

Number of passengers using a service

In public transportation, ridership refers to the number of people using a transit service. It is often summed or otherwise aggregated over some period of time for a given service or set of services and used as a benchmark of success or usefulness. Common statistics include the number of people served by an entire transit system in a year and the number of people served each day by a single transit line.

The concept should not be confused with the maximum capacity of a particular vehicle or transit line.

== See also ==
- Crush load – High passenger vehicle occupancy leading to crushing
- Environmental impact of transport
- Headway – Distance between vehicles in a transit system measured in time or space
- Route capacity – Maximum occupancy of a route in a given time
- Passenger load factor – Capacity utilization of public transport
- Passengers per hour per direction – Measure of passenger capacity of a transportation network
- Public transport accessibility level
