= Passenger pusher =

Urban transit job

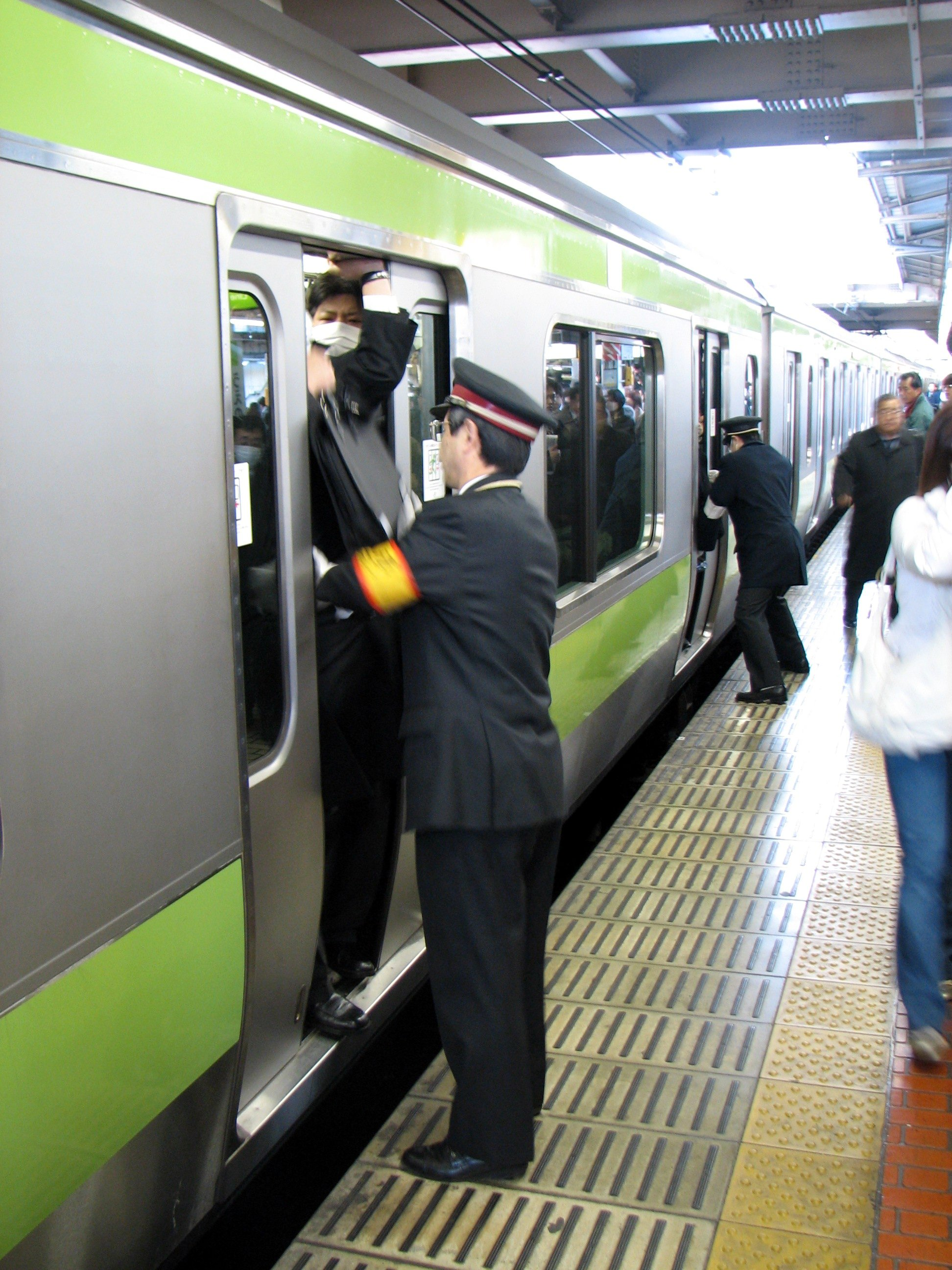
Rush hour at Ueno Station in Tokyo on the Yamanote Line, 2007. Note that the pusher wears usual business dress and not a high-visibility one.

A passenger pusher is a worker who pushes people onto a mass transportation vehicle at a crowded stop during rush hour.

== Historical use ==
=== Japan ===
When passenger pushers were first brought in at Shinjuku Station, they were called "passenger arrangement staff" (旅客整理係, ryokaku seiri gakari), and were largely made up of students working part-time; currently, station staff and/or part-time workers fill these roles during morning rush hours on many lines. During the run-up to the 1964 Summer Olympics in Tokyo, a special issue of LIFE magazine described a photograph by Brian Brake as showing "the Tokyo commuter trains where riders are squashed aboard by white-gloved official pushers." In 1975, oshiya packed commuters into rush-hour trains that were filled to an average of 221 percent of designed capacity.

=== New York City ===
Why, from the moment of starting, I have been mauled and hauled about by the crowds, and every conductor yelled at me, 'Step lively, step lively, lady,' and some even caught hold of me and jerked me on the car and then pushed me into the struggling crowd of passengers inside. 'Step lively,' indeed!

— anonymous widow describing her New York City streetcar experience, The Spectator, c.1890s

New York City conductors were well known for using the phrase "step lively" to exhort passengers to clear space by the doors of streetcars and subway cars during the early 20th century, dating back to the opening of the New York City Subway in 1904. "Step lively" was seen as an overly imperative phrase that "flusters the timid and uncertain and angers those who desire to be courteously treated". The New York Times advocated the use of "press forward" instead of "step lively" in 1908.

Early legal precedent in New York held railway operators liable for injuries resulting from overcrowded platforms; since the operator controlled access to the platforms, they could limit the number of passengers on the platform and prevent crowds from pushing and potentially injuring passengers. Another New York decision held the operator would be blameless for the pressing action of the crowd, but noted that since the car had been subject to "forced augmentation" by an employee (the guard), the operator was held liable. In Boston, a court ruled the schedule and convenience of other passengers meant that efforts to minimize station dwell time were justified, although physically packing passengers on trains was not mentioned.

A New York Times article from August 8, 1918, mentions subway guards and police trying to direct and push crowds onto trains operating along the new 42nd Street Shuttle service between Times Square and Grand Central. By the 1920s, pushers in the New York City Subway were known worldwide, but were not well-liked due to their reputation as "sardine packers".

New York City subway pushers are depicted in the 1941 biographical movie Sergeant York; George Tobias plays the character "Pusher" Ross, a soldier from New York City. In the film, "Pusher" has to explain his nickname to Alvin York – which he got because he pushes passengers onto the crowded subway cars during rush hours. The story takes place during World War I, which establishes that "Pusher" was a subway pusher in New York City prior to 1918. Also, in the Bugs Bunny cartoon Hurdy Gurdy Hare, Bugs dons a conductor's cap and pushes a gorilla while saying, "push in, plenty of room in the center of the car!", pausing to tell the audience "I used to work on the shuttle from Times Square to Grand Central". The cartoon was copyrighted in 1948 and released in 1950.

== Current use ==
=== China ===
At least three cities in China have employed professional train pushers. The Beijing Subway has hired employees to help pack commuters onto train carriages since 2008. On the Shanghai Metro, trains running on Line 8 at up to 170% of capacity during peak hours in 2010 have used volunteers to help fill carriages. In 2012, seven years after opening, crowds on Chongqing Metro trains were so thick that pushers were used during peak hours.

=== Japan ===
In Japan, pushers are known as oshiya (押し屋). The term is derived from the verb osu (押す), meaning "push", and the suffix -ya (屋), indicating "line of work." Oshiya ensure every passenger has boarded and does not get caught in the doors, as described during a CNN interview with Sandra Barron, an American living in Tokyo.

A 1995 New York Times article noted white-gloved oshiya were still being deployed during rush hours, but called them "tushy pushers", or shiri oshi (尻 押し). Since 2000, rush-hour trains had become significantly less crowded, running at an average of 183 percent of capacity.^{[a]} By 2019, severe crowding has been largely eliminated on Japanese train lines outside of Tokyo. Train lines in Tokyo have had significant reductions in overcrowding and now run at an average of 163 percent of capacity.^{[a]} This was driven by increased capacity (a system-wide 60% increase in 2000 compared to 1970), and changing passenger demand dynamics caused by stagnant growth since 1990s, declining population and commuter incentives designed to make off-peak hour trains more inviting. This led to a decline in the number of pushers needed and largely confining them to the Tokyo area on some still extremely congested lines.

=== Madrid Metro ===
In February 2017, Madrid hired "pushers" in its Metro to cope with increased numbers of passengers. Line 8, which connects the Madrid–Barajas Airport to Madrid's city center, was temporarily closed due to maintenance works, which caused a surge of passengers on other lines. In Spanish, subway pushers are literally called "pushers" (empujadores); they help passengers embark and make sure that carriage doors are properly closed. Some observers immediately made comparisons with the Japanese oshiya.

=== New York City Subway ===
The Metropolitan Transportation Authority hires "platform controllers" to direct crowds to minimize platform dwell times, although their duties do not include physically moving passengers. They perform similar duties as the subway guards, who performed similar duties in the subway through the 1940s.

=== Rhine-Main S-Bahn ===
Since 2015, Deutsche Bahn has been using pushers at Frankfurt's main train station (Frankfurt Hauptbahnhof) and at times at the Messe (trade fair) S-Bahn station and other highly frequented stations (e.g. Eschborn Süd). These platform attendants are called Einstiegslotsen (boarding guides; initially, they were called Fahrgastlenker, i.e. "passenger steerers"). As it was considered indelicate to actually "push" people forward physically, as is standard procedure e.g. in Tokyo-Shinjuku station, the Einstiegslotsen try to avoid direct physical contact. They concentrate on boosting passenger entry and barring the access to the closing doors to stop people trying to enter the full train.

== Notes ==
a. Crowding levels defined by the Ministry of Land, Infrastructure, Transport and Tourism:

100% — Commuters have enough personal space and are able to take a seat or stand while holding onto the straps or hand rails.
150% — Commuters have enough personal space to read a newspaper.
180% — Commuters must fold newspapers to read.
200% — Commuters are pressed against each other in each compartment but can still read small magazines.
250% — Commuters are pressed against each other, unable to move.
