= List of countries by rail usage =

Map of the world with rail density (length of rail network divided by area of country) highlighted. This does not necessarily reflect actual rail use.

This is a list of countries by rail usage. Usage of rail transport may be measured in tonne-kilometres (tkm) or passenger-kilometres (pkm) travelled for freight and passenger transport respectively. This is the number of tonnes or passengers multiplied by the average distance of their journeys in kilometres.

== Overview ==
Globally, rail freight is transported to the extent of almost 10,000 billion tonne-kilometres (9.842 billion long ton-miles or 11.023 billion short ton-miles) per year, of which about one-third occurs in India and a quarter each in the United States and China.

Of the 3,000 bn passenger-kilometres travelled across the world each year, 1,346 bn are travelled in China and 1,150 bn in India. Thus China and India together contribute almost half of world's passenger travel.

The average Swiss person travels 2,430 km by train each year (the highest in the world), almost 500 more than the average Japanese person (the second highest).

In 2014, there were about 1 million kilometres (621,400 miles) of railway in the world, a decrease of 3% compared to 2013.

- 350,000 km (218,000 mi) were in Europe and mainly used for passenger service.
- 370,000 km (230,000 mi) were in North America and mainly used for freight.
- 230,000 km (140,000 mi) were in Asia and used for both freight and passenger service.

In America and Europe, many low-fare airlines and motorways compete with rail for passenger traffic. Asia has experienced a large growth in high-speed rail: its 257bn passenger-kilometres represent 72% of total world high-speed rail passenger traffic.

== Passenger rail ==
These figures do not include metro railway systems; see Lists of rapid transit systems for metro rail statistics.

=== Passenger-kilometres of rail transport per year ===
Countries with more than five billion passenger-kilometres (pkm) travelled per year. Unless otherwise specified, data come from the Railway Statistics 2015 Report by the International Union of Railways (UIC).

Rank	Country/Region	Passenger-kilometres (billions)	Data year
1	China	1,640	2025
2	India	1,133	2025
3	European Union	457	2025
4	Japan	420	2025
5	Russia	142.3	2025
6	Germany	112	2025
7	France	96.6	2025
8	South Korea	93.5	2023
9	United Kingdom	63.8	2024
10	Italy	54	2025
11	United States	45.6	2024
12	Poland	30.7	2025
13	Spain	29.8	2024
14	Ukraine	28.4	2019
17	Pakistan	23.1	2022
15	Switzerland	22.8	2025
16	Turkey	21.2	2025
18	Taiwan	19.8	2015
19	Indonesia	18.5	2015
20	Kazakhstan	18.5	2018
21	Netherlands	17.3	2025
22	Iran	16.3	2014
23	Austria	15.1	2025
24	Australia	15	2023-24
25	Hungary	15	2024

=== Passengers carried in rail transport per year ===
Countries with more than 20 million passengers per year. Unless otherwise specified, data come from the Railway Statistics 2019 Report by the International Union of Railways.

As mentioned in the notes, many of these figures are very incomplete, as they exclude metro/rapid transport rail services.

Rank	Country	Million passengers	Data year	Notes
1	Japan	23,377	2024	Includes all public and private rail services. For only the JR group rail companies, the figure in 2024 was 8,673 million passengers.
2	European Union	8,631	2025	Excludes Belgium.
3	India	7,293	2025	Includes Indian Railways suburban and intercity traffic only, excludes the passengers carried by rapid transit systems.
4	China	4,312	2024	Excludes rapid transit networks, which handled 23.71 billion passengers in 2019.
5	Germany	2,954	2025	
6	Brazil	2,571	2024	Includes all public and private, urban and long distance rail services. 3.63% increase from the 2.481 billion passengers carried in 2023. In 2024 long-distance services alone carried 1.259 million passengers, 0.05% of the total.
7	(United Kingdom) Great Britain	1,812.2	2025	
8	France	1,312	2025	
9	Russia	1,157.2	2018	Moscow Metro alone had 2.45 billion passengers in 2014
10	Australia	1,064.2	2018–19	Combined Urban and Non-Urban Rail Passenger Traffic
11	Italy	844	2019	
12	Spain	695	2025	
13	Switzerland	669	2025	
14	United States	535	2019	Amtrak had 32.5 million passengers in Fiscal Year 2019 (ending September 30). Among regional systems that report to the American Public Transportation Association, there were 502.5 million commuter rail riders in calendar year 2019.
15	Ukraine	440.9	2016	
16	Poland	432	2025	
17	Indonesia	429.2	2019	
18	Argentina	426.2	2018	423,202,522 Buenos Aires commuter 2,036,792 regional 1,009,357 long distance
19	Netherlands	389	2025	
20	Austria	344	2025	

=== Passenger modal share for rail ===
The modal share of railway transport (excluding tram & metro) as compared to other modes of transport, based on Passenger-km.

Rank	Country	Modal share (%)	year
1	Japan	32.9	2016
2	China	32	2021
3	Russia	24.4	2018
4	Switzerland	22.9	2024
5	India	20.0	2018
6	Austria	14	2024
7	Netherlands	12	2023
8	United Kingdom	11.8	2023
9	France	11.1	2023
10	Sweden	10.6	2023
11	Hungary	10	2023
12	Germany	9.9	2023
13	Belgium	9.4	2023
14	Slovakia	9.2	2023
15	Czech Republic	9.0	2023
16	Poland	8.5	2023
17	Denmark	7.9	2023
18	Spain	7.3	2023
19	Finland	7.1	2023
20	Indonesia	6.3	2005
21	Italy	6.8	2023
22	Norway	5.3	2023
23	Luxembourg	5	2023
24	Portugal	4.2	2023
25	Croatia	4.0	2023
26	Romania	4.0	2023
27	Latvia	3.8	2023
28	Ireland	3.0	2023
29	Slovenia	2.6	2023
30	Bulgaria	2.4	2023
31	Estonia	2.3	2023
32	Turkey	1.6	2023
33	Serbia	1.3	2023
34	Montenegro	1.2	2023
35	Lithuania	1.0	2023
36	Greece	0.5	2023
37	North Macedonia	0.2	2023
38	United States	0.3	2004

=== Passenger rail by passenger-kilometres per capita ===
Countries with more than five billion passenger-kilometres travelled per year.

Country	Kilometers/year	Year
Japan	2,825	2022
Switzerland	2,519	2024
Hungary	1,692	2025
France	1,606	2025
Austria	1,588	2025
South Korea	1,352	2021
Germany	1,287	2024
Sweden	1,287	2024
Denmark	1,081	2024
Belgium	982	2023
Finland	965	2024
Italy	948	2024
United Kingdom	947	2024
Czech Republic	944	2024
Netherlands	943	2024

== Freight rail ==
=== Tonne-kilometres of rail transport per year ===
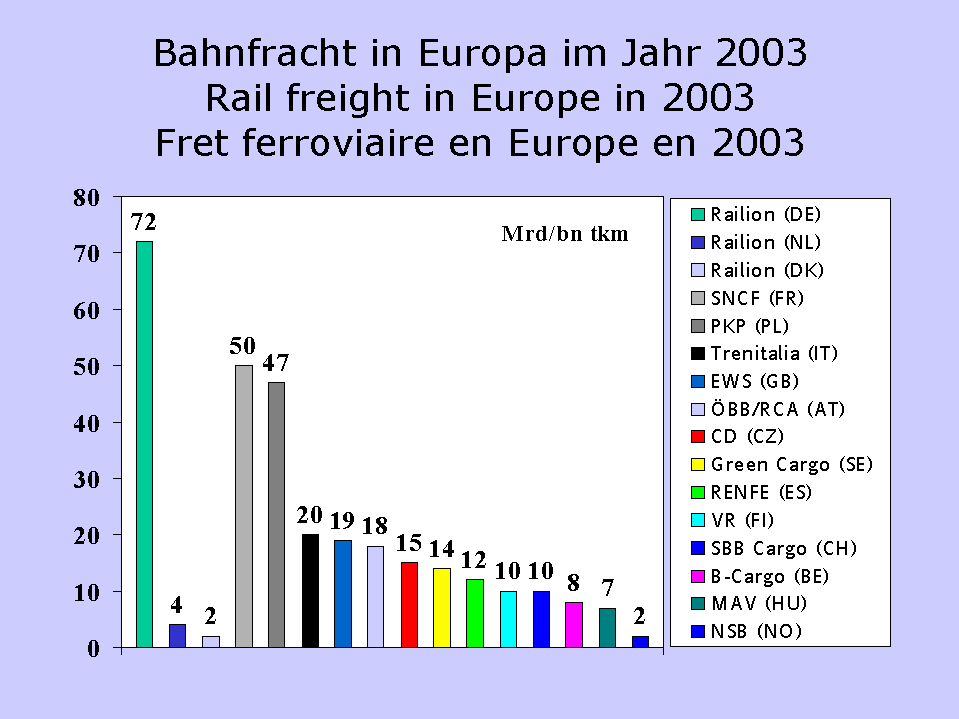
Tonne-km of selected carriers in the European Union, 2003

Countries with more than one billion tonne-kilometres (tkm) travelled per year. Unless otherwise specified, data come from the Railway Statistics 2014 Report by the International Union of Railways.

Rank	Country	Billion tkm	Data year
1	China	3,687	2025
2	Russia	2,639	2021
3	United States	2,105	2020
4	India	972	2025
5	Canada	451	2024
6	Australia	413	2016
7	Brazil	408.1	2025
—	European Union	261	2014
8	Ukraine	237	2011
9	Kazakhstan	236	2012
10	South Africa	135	2014
11	Mexico	126.9	2017
12	Germany	113	2019
13	Poland	56.2	2025
14	Belarus	45	2014
15	France	31.8	2019
16	United Kingdom	24.4	2014
17	Uzbekistan	22	2012
18	Iran	22	2013
19	Austria	21.7	2019
20	Sweden	21.1	2014
21	Japan	21	2014
22	Italy	21	2019
23	Lithuania	16.2	2019
24	Czech Republic	16.2	2019
25	Latvia	15	2019
26	Turkey	14.7	2019
27	Argentina	12	2010
28	Turkmenistan	12	2012
29	Switzerland	11	2019
30	Spain	10.3	2019
31	South Korea	10	2013
32	Romania	10	2014
33	Finland	9.6	2014
34	Azerbaijan	8	2014
35	Mauritania	8	2010
36	Indonesia	7	2010
37	Netherlands	6	2013
38	Morocco	6	2011
39	Belgium	5	2014
40	Norway	4	2013
41	Chile	4	2009
42	Vietnam	4	2012
43	Malaysia	3	2011
44	Serbia	3	2014
45	Thailand	3	2011
46	Estonia	2.2	2019
47	Gabon	2	2014
48	Croatia	3.279	2020
49	Denmark	2	2013
50	Tunisia	2	2010
51	Egypt	2	2010
52	Kenya	1.7	2014
53	Israel	1.4	2016
54	Algeria	1	2012
55	Cameroon	1	2011

=== Tonnes carried in rail transport per year ===
Countries with more than ten million tonnes carried per year. Unless otherwise specified, data come from the Railway Statistics 2014 Report by the International Union of Railways.

Rank	Country	Million tonnes	Data year
1	China	5,277	2025
2	United States	1,600	2022
3	India	1,617	2024
4	Australia	1,347	2016
5	Russia	1,116	2025
6	Brazil	554.5	2025
7	Canada	421	2024
8	Kazakhstan	295	2012
9	Germany	221	2014
10	Poland	217.8	2025
11	South Africa	197	2011
12	Ukraine	161.3	2025
13	Belarus	141	2014
14	Mexico	128	2018
15	United Kingdom	110.1	2014
16	Uzbekistan	82	2014
17	Austria	74	2014
18	Sweden	65	2015
19	France	63	2011
20	Czech Republic	57	2014
21	Latvia	57	2014
22	Switzerland	50	2014
23	Lithuania	49	2014
24	Romania	44	2014
25	Netherlands	42.6	2021
26	South Korea	40	2013
27	Italy	38	2014
28	Finland	37	2014
29	Belgium	37	2009
30	Slovakia	36	2014
31	Morocco	37	2011
32	Iran	33	2013
33	Japan	31	2010
34	Turkmenistan	27	2012
35	Turkey	26	2014
36	Estonia	26	2012
37	Spain	25	2014
38	Chile	25	2013
39	Argentina	24	2010
40	Azerbaijan	23	2012
41	Georgia	20	1917
42	Indonesia	20	2010
43	Mongolia	18	2011
44	Slovenia	17	2014
45	Bosnia and Herzegovina	13	2014
46	Malaysia	12	2011
47	Bulgaria	12	2014
48	Taiwan	11	2012
49	Thailand	11	2011
50	Croatia	10	2014
51	Tunisia	10	2012

=== Freight modal share for rail ===
The modal share carried by rail of all freight in a given country.

Rank	Country	Modal share (%)	Data year
1	Canada	68	2009
2	Latvia	61	2012
3	Australia	60	2016
4	Russia	59	2010
5	Estonia	47	2012
6	Switzerland	46	2012
7	United States	44	2008
8	Austria	41	2012
9	Sweden	40	2012
10	Lithuania	38	2012
11	India	33	2016
12	Finland	27	2012
13	Brazil	26.9	2024
14	Romania	24	2012
15	Germany	23	2012
16	Czech Republic	22	2012
17	Hungary	21	2012
18	Slovakia	20	2012
19	Poland	18	2012
20	Belgium	18	2012
21	China	15	2019
22	France	15	2012
23	Italy	14	2012
24	United Kingdom	12	2012
25	Bulgaria	9	2012
26	Japan	6.2	2010
27	Netherlands	5	-
28	Ireland	0.7	2007

=== Freight rail by tonne-kilometres per capita ===
Rank	Country	Tonne-kilometre per capita	Data year
1	Russia	12,599	
2	Canada	10,932	2024
3	United States	9,165	
4	Australia	2,308	
5	China	2,150	2019
6	Brazil	1,873.4	2024
7	Switzerland	1,480	2013
8	Germany	1,060	
	European Union	782	

== Brief railway statistics by country ==
Country	Area (million km^{2})	Pop. (million)	Rail company	Net	Double track	Electrified	HSR	Passenger-km (billion)	Freight tonne-km (billion)	HS‑Vol (pass. km)	Pass.	Freight	Pass/ pop %	Elec %
Country	Area (million km^{2})	Pop. (million)	Rail company	(thousands of km)				Passenger-km (billion)	Freight tonne-km (billion)	HS‑Vol (pass. km)	(modal %)		Pass/ pop %	Elec %
Austria	0.08	8.57	ÖBB	9.8	4.9	3.5	0.28	11.2	32.9		12.1	41		71.9
Brazil	8.51	212.58	Multiple	31.7	1.86	1.14	0.00	0.66	398.3	0.00	0.85	26.9	1.21	3.59
China	9.6	1,397	CR	141	83	100	36	1640	3687	200	41.6	31		71.9
Egypt	1	93	ENR	5	1.5	0.07		41	4				6.1	
France	0.55	68	SNCF	29	16	14	1.8	81	40	48			16.8	58.2
Germany	0.36	80.68	DB	34	18	20	1.2	74	91	22	10	17	22.4	60
India	3.28	1,326	IR	67.3	17.4	64.5		1065	975				5.5	98
Iran	1.6	80.04	RAJA	7	1	0.15	0.25	13	21	0	4	7	0.3	1
Italy	0.3	59	FS	16	7	12	0.82	45	21	9				71.6
Japan	0.38	126	JR	20	8	12	2.5	253	23	79	29		69.6	100
Kazakhstan	2.72	17	KTZ	14	5	4		14	191					
Morocco	0.44	34	ONCFM	2	0.6	1		4	6				0.8	89
Netherlands	0.04	17	NS	3.2	2.0	2.3	0.1	17.8	6		8.8	5		70.7
Pakistan	0.796	192	PR	7		0.3		26	6					
Poland	0.31	38	PKP	19	9	12	0.136	30.7						63.7
Russia	17.09	143	RZD	128	36	48	1.3	173	2090	14	42	67	9.1	80
Slovakia	0.049	5.45	ŽSR	3.627		1.587	0	3.815	6.729	0				
South Africa	1.22	54	SAR	24	2	8		14	109				11	
South Korea	0.1	50	KNR	3	1	2	0.32	32	11	10			20.4	20
Spain	0.51	46	Renfe	15	5	9	3.7	21	11	4				63.8
Switzerland	0.041	8.38	SBB	5.443		5.443		22.290	13		22.5	37.8	40.9	100
Taiwan	0.036	23	TR	1	0.67	0.69	0.33	9	1					
Turkey	0.78	79	TCDD	9	04	1.9	0.25	6	10					47
United Kingdom	0.24	65	Multiple	16		5	0.3	48	21					65
United States	9.6	324	AMTK	227					2820			42		1
World	149	7,432		900	250	240	35.44	2468	9486	178	10	20		50

== See also ==
- List of countries by rail transport network size
- Rail transport by country
