= Rush hour =

Time of day with peak traffic congestion

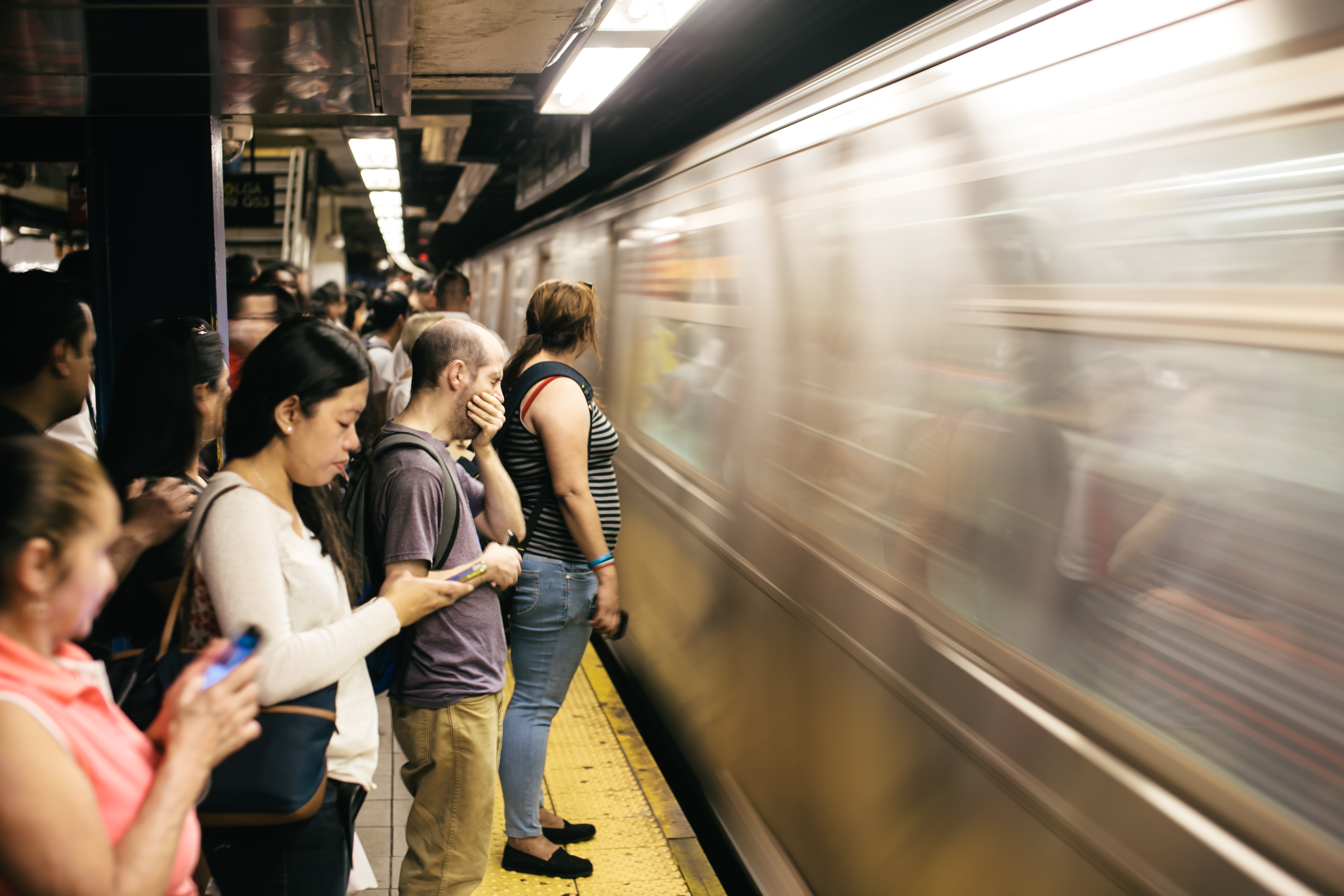
Morning rush hour on the New York City Subway platform at Jackson Heights–Roosevelt Avenue

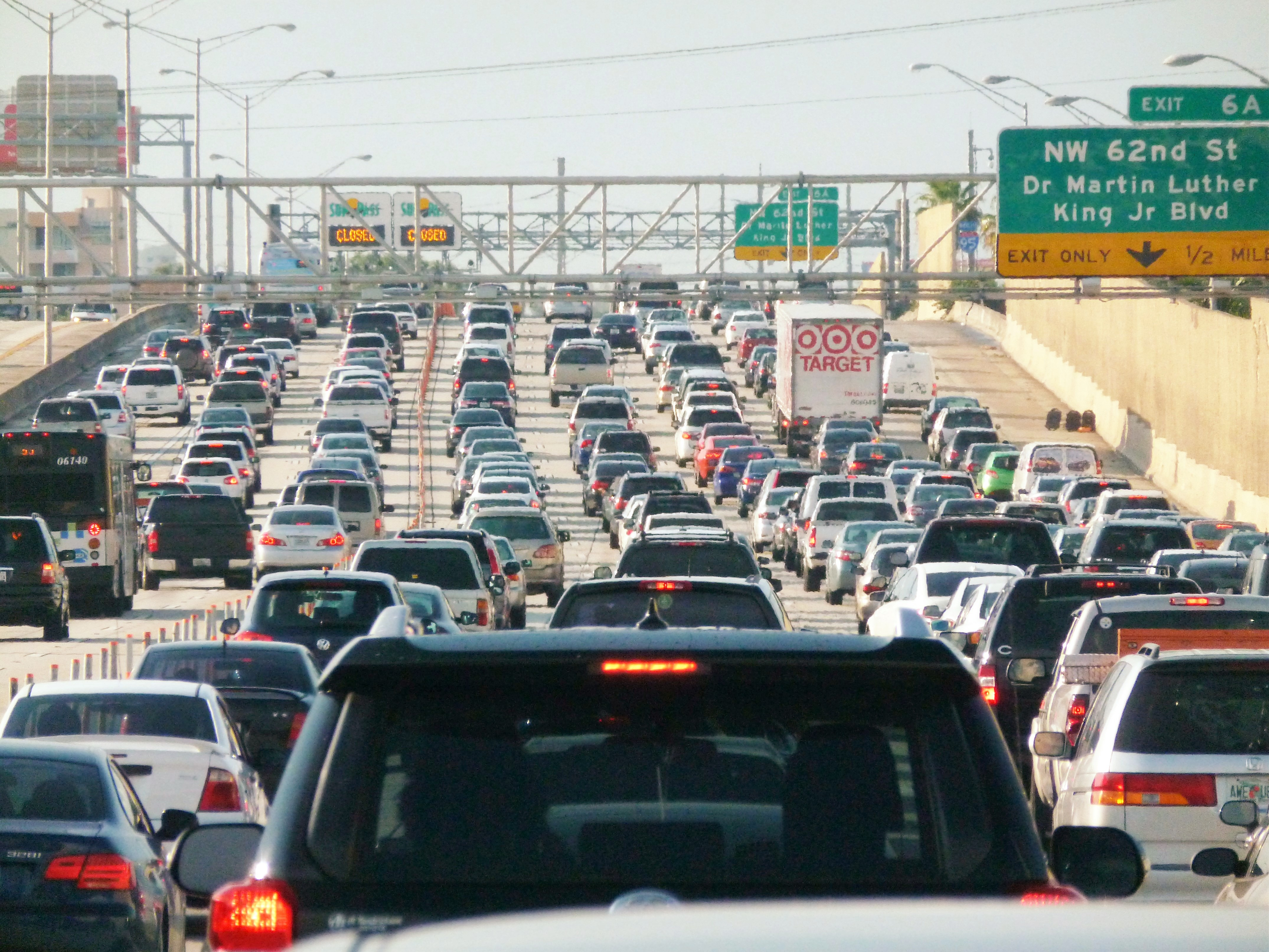
Afternoon rush hour traffic on Interstate 95 in Miami

A rush hour (American English, British English) or peak hour (Australian English, Indian English) is a part of the day during which traffic congestion on roads and crowding on public transport is at its highest. Normally, this happens twice every weekday: once in the morning and once in the afternoon or evening, the times during which most people commute. The term is often used for a period of peak congestion that may last for more than one hour.

The term is very broad, but often refers specifically to private automobile transportation traffic, even when there is a large volume of cars on a road but not many people, or if the volume is normal but there is some disruption of speed. By analogy to vehicular traffic, the term Internet rush hour has been used to describe periods of peak data network usage, resulting in delays and slower delivery of data packets.

== Definition ==
The name is sometimes a misnomer, as the peak period often lasts more than one hour and the "rush" refers to the volume of traffic, not the speed of its flow. Peak traffic periods may vary from country to country, city to city, from region to region, and seasonally.

The frequency of public transport service is usually higher in the rush hour, and longer trains or larger vehicles are often used. However, the increase in capacity is often less than the increased number of passengers, due to the limits on available vehicles, staff and, in the case of rail transport, track capacity including platform length. The resulting crowding may force many passengers to stand, and others may be unable to board. If there is inadequate capacity, this can make public transport less attractive, leading to higher car use and partly shifting the congestion to roads.

Transport demand management, such as road pricing or a congestion charge, is designed to induce people to alter their travel timing to minimize congestion. Similarly, public transport fares may be higher during peak periods; this is often presented as an off peak discount for single fares. Season tickets or multi-ride tickets, sold at a discount, are commonly used in rush hours by commuters, and may or may not reflect rush hour fare differentials.

Staggered hours have been promoted as a means of spreading demand across a longer time span—for example, in Rush Hour (1941 film), The Apartment, and by the International Labour Office.

== Traffic management by country ==
=== Australia and New Zealand ===
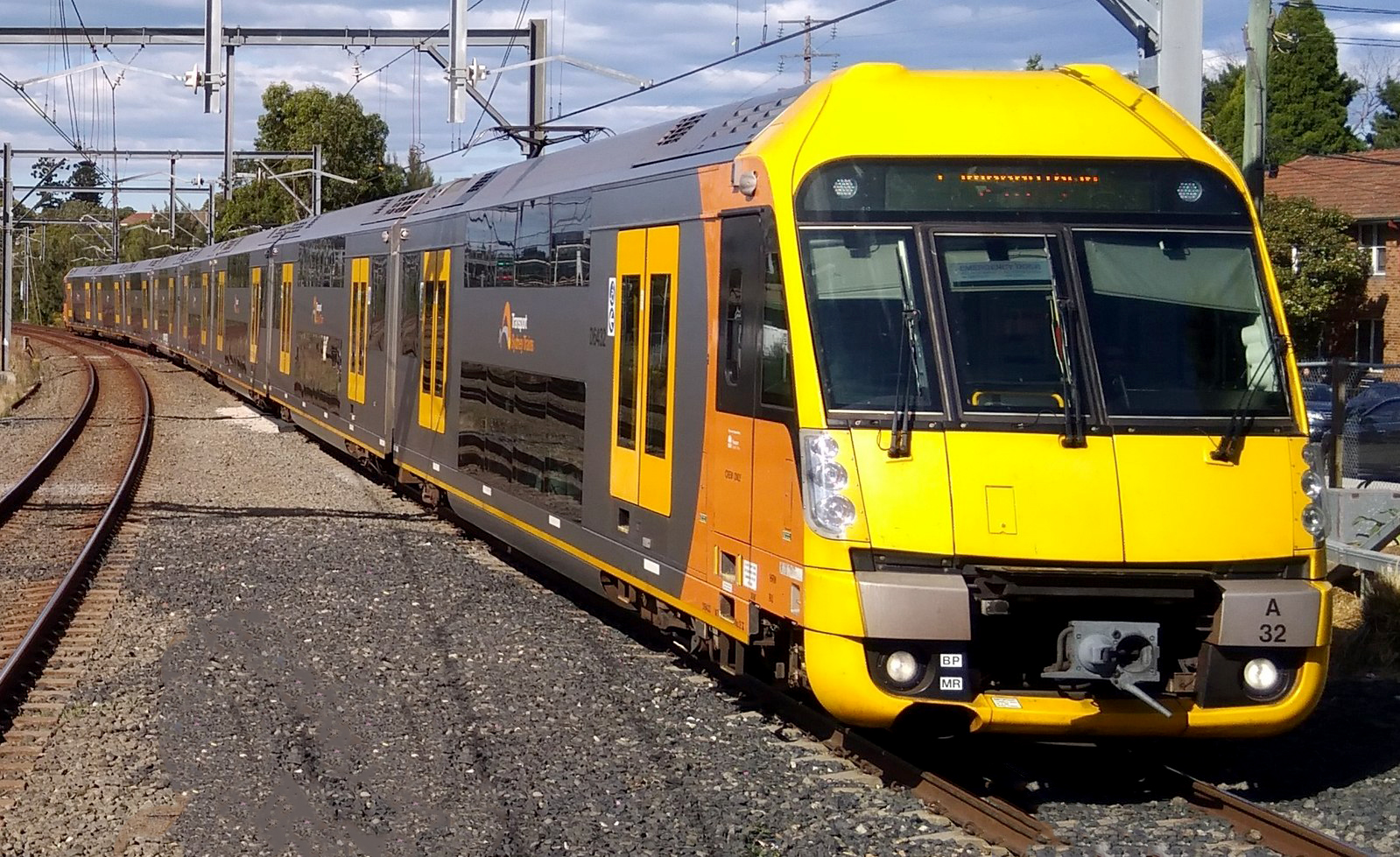
A set on the Sydney Trains network. All suburban trains on the network have two decks for increased capacity.

In the morning, and evening, Sydney, Brisbane and Melbourne, and Auckland and Christchurch are usually the most congested cities in Australia and New Zealand respectively. In Melbourne the Monash Freeway, which connects Melbourne's suburban sprawl to the city, is usually heavily congested each morning and evening. In Perth, Mitchell Freeway, Kwinana Freeway and various arterial roads are usually congested between peak hours, making movement between suburbs and the city quite slow.

Efforts to minimise traffic congestion during peak hour vary on a state by state and city by city basis.

In Melbourne, congestion is managed by means including:

- Inbound transit lanes on busy freeways which are limited to motorcycles and other vehicles with more than one occupant during busy periods.
- Free travel on metropolitan trains before 7 am. Passengers must exit the system at their destination station before 7:15 am, a 15-minute buffer for disembarking and touching off.
- Dedicated bus lanes on major inner city roads such as Hoddle Street.
- Introduction of dedicated bicycle lanes (often by removing vehicle lanes) in the inner city area to encourage cyclists and deter dual-track vehicles.
- Prohibition of parking along busy roads during peak traffic periods to create an extra lane for traffic.

In Brisbane, congestion is managed by means including:

- Fares for using public transport outside of peak periods (referred to as off-peak) are cheaper than peak period fares.
- Transport for Brisbane operated bus lines for Translink, Bus upgrade zone) designated lines increase their frequency from every 15 minutes to every 10 minutes between 7am and 9am, and between 4:30pm and 6:30pm.
- Busways in Brisbane grade separate a significant amount of bus traffic, particularly on the South and Eastern suburbs using the South East Busway, the Eastern Busway (connects with the South East Busway at Buranda), with some relief on the northern suburbs provided by the Northern Busway. This reduces the traffic load shared by buses and other vehicles, therefore allowing for more capacity for other vehicles on major trunk roads in and out of Brisbane.
- Some specific peak-hour only bus services are denoted by a "P" prefix where only fares are accepted by tapping on with a go card, with no cash-paid ticket sales. These services may also be noted as having the suffix

"(Rocket)" in timetables, where many inner city suburb stops may be bypassed.

- On some Queensland Rail operated lines for Translink, increase frequency from every 30 minutes to as frequent as every 6 minutes, between 6:45 am and 7:45 am and from 4:45 pm to 5:45 pm during peak times. Most notable on the Caboolture, Ipswich & Rosewood, Redcliffe Peninsula and Springfield lines.
- On the Caboolture, Sunshine Coast and Redcliffe Peninsula line, trains may run express to reduce travel time. A notable example is the trains on the Cabooolture and Sunshine Coast lines run express from Petrie to Bowen Hills, stopping only at Northgate, Eagle Junction and Bowen Hills; previously before the timetable changes, average commute time from Caboolture to Central was 1 hour and 6 minutes. After the timetable changes, it was reduced to 51 minutes, a saving of 15 minutes.
- Introduction of the South East Bikeway, which runs alongside the South East Busway to allow for cycle commuting from the Southern suburbs. Some paths along the Brisbane River are also widened to include a specific bikeway section (particularly between Toowong and North Quay).
- Prohibition of parking along busy roads during peak traffic periods to create an extra lane for traffic.

In Sydney, congestion is managed by many means including:

- Buses increase frequency from 4 per hour to 12 per hour on the Metrobus network, other routes increase limited and express services
- The Sydney Trains network runs double-decker electric multiple unit trains that allowed many more passengers to board the trains compared to the 1950s single-level 'Red Rattlers', and 'Silver Ghosts'.
- Time-of-day ticket prices allow train commuters to board trains before 6 am or after 7 pm at a cheaper rate on single or day return tickets
- Transit and/or HOV Lanes are installed on many major arterial roads,
- The Rail Clearways Program, which allows for broken-down trains on the Sydney Trains network to not affect the running of trains on separate lines due to building bypasses, and loop-backs alongside the existing track
- The Inner West Light Rail, which was the first operational light rail line in Sydney, increases headways during peak hour, providing services up to every eight minutes.

Traffic congestion is managed through the Traffic Management Centre via a network of Closed Circuit TV's, with operators able to change the timing of traffic signals to reduce wait times

- Most major motorways have the ability for contraflow lane to allow continuing flow of traffic in case of a major accident
- Older motor ways have been upgraded from two lanes in each direction, to three lanes in each direction
- Motor way toll booths have been replaced with electronic toll systems (M2 Hills Motorway was the last to do so on 21 January 2012); time-of-day tolling is in use on the Sydney Harbour Bridge and Sydney Harbour Tunnel to provide cash incentives for commuters to remain out of the city in peak times.

=== Brazil ===
In São Paulo, Brazil, each vehicle is assigned a certain day of the week in which it cannot travel the roads during rush hour (7–10 am and 5–8 pm). The day of the week for each vehicle is derived from the last digit in the licence plate number and the rule is enforced by traffic police (1 and 2 for Mondays, 3 and 4 for Tuesdays, 5 and 6 for Wednesdays, 7 and 8 for Thursdays and 9 and 10 for Fridays). This policy is aimed at reducing the number of vehicles on the roads and encouraging the use of buses, subway and the urban train systems.

=== Canada ===
Vancouver's portion of the Trans-Canada Highway is served with high-occupancy vehicle lanes in addition to standard lanes for all automobiles. These lanes are meant to improve traffic flow by encouraging carpooling and transit use. Richmond, part of the Vancouver metro region, is also constructing a new interchange at Steveson Highway and British Columbia Highway 99 which will be the first of its kind in British Columbia in an effort to improve traffic flow.

Kelowna's Harvey Avenue is served also by HOV lanes.

=== China ===
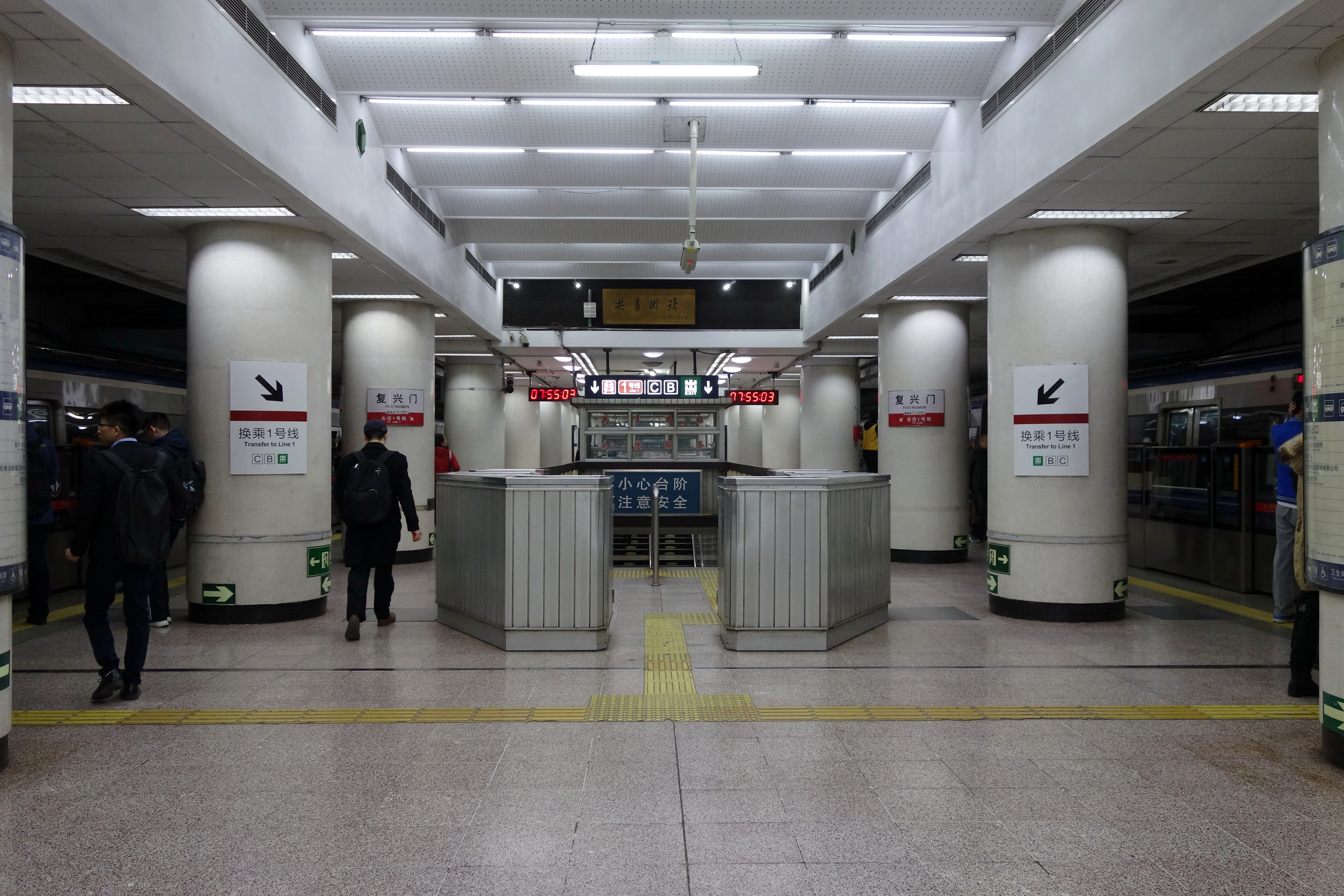
Fuxingmen station transfer from Line 2 to Line 1. Note the barrier used to restrict passenger flow to reduce congestion on Line 1 platforms.

China is home to some of the busiest subway networks in the world. Despite aggressive expansion of rapid transit networks in the past decade, rapid urban population growth has put heavy demand on urban transport. Some systems routinely restrict station entrances and transfer passages to prevent the network from being overwhelmed. For example, 96 subway stations in the Beijing Subway have entry restrictions at some point during the day. The Guangzhou Metro has 51 stations with passenger flow restrictions.

=== Colombia ===
In the pico y placa (peak and license plate) program in Bogotá, drivers of non-commercial automobiles are prevented from driving them during rush hours on certain days of the week. The vehicles barred each day are determined by the last digit of their license plate. The measure is mandatory and those who break it are penalized. The digits banned each day are rotated every year.

=== Japan ===
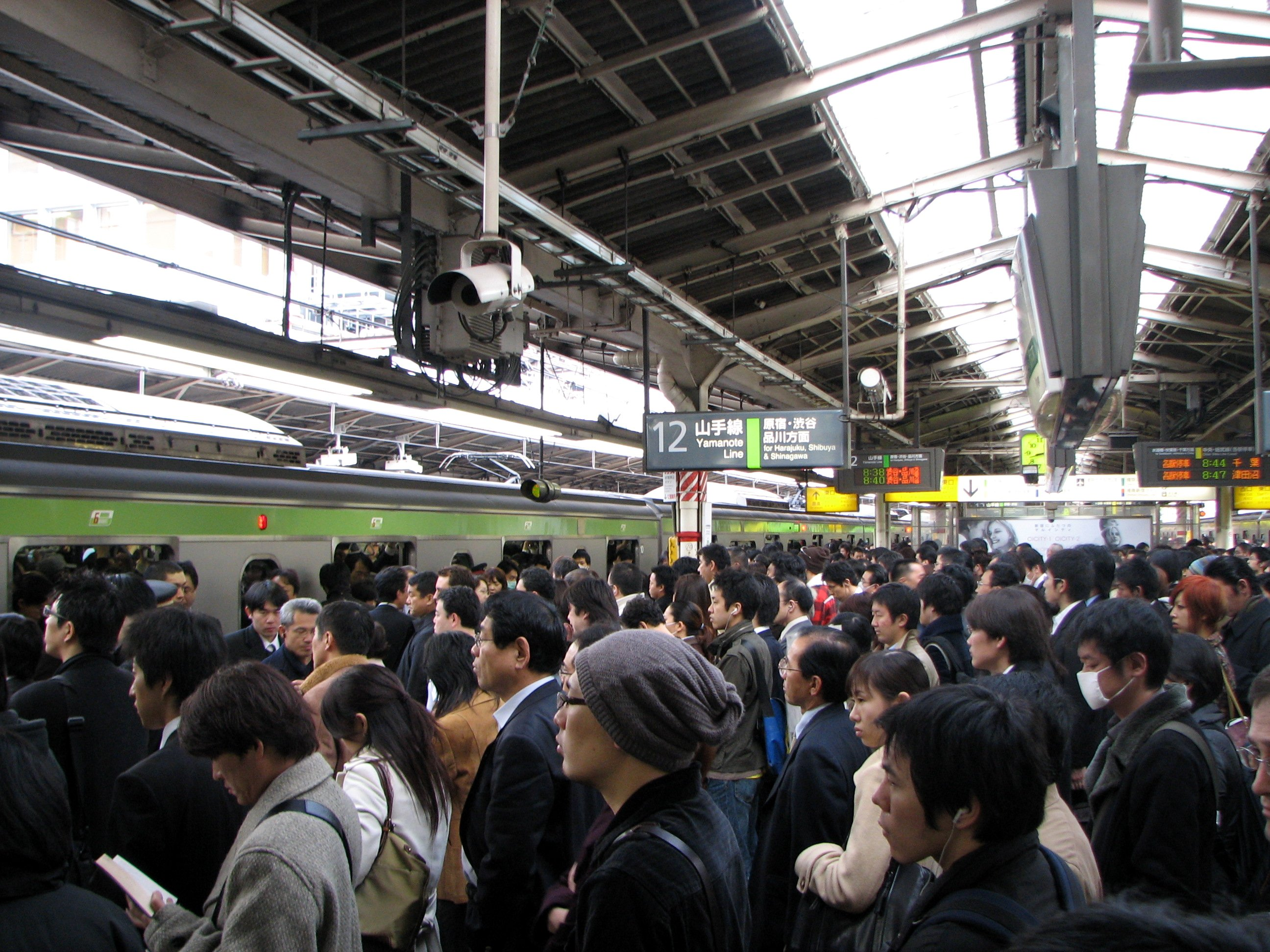
Rush hour at Shinjuku Station, Tokyo. The station is the world's busiest, used by approximately 3.8 million passengers per day in 2008.

In Japan, the proportion of rail transportation is high compared with the use of automobiles. Rail transport accounts for 27% of all passenger transport in Japan (other examples: Germany (7.7%), United Kingdom (6.4%), United States (0.6%)). In the Greater Tokyo Area and the Keihanshin metropolitan area there is a dense rail network and frequent service, which accounts for more than half of the passenger transport; most people in the area commute by public transport without using cars.

Railways in the Greater Tokyo Area are traditionally known to be severely congested, with oshiya employed to assist passengers getting on the train. This is gradually being improved by increasing rail capacity and demand management. Train lines in Tokyo have had significant reductions in overcrowding and today run at an average of 163 percent of capacity.^{[a]} This is in contrast to the average loading of 221 percent of designed capacity^{[a]} in 1975 rush-hour trains.

In road transport, the expressways of Japan operate on a beneficiaries-pay principle which imposes expensive toll fees, having the effect of reducing road traffic. Electronic toll collection (ETC) is widespread and discounts during low-traffic periods have been introduced to distribute traffic over a longer period. Road pricing is being considered but has not been introduced, partly because the expressway fee is already very high.

=== Netherlands ===
For trains in the Netherlands there is an off-peak discount available, giving a 40% discount. Off-peak hours range from 9 am to 4 pm and from 6.30 pm to 6.30 am at weekdays, and all day at weekends. In the case of a group of up to four people, all get the discount even if only one has a pass.

Rail passes not requiring an additional ticket come in two versions: for a fixed route, and for the whole network. Both are mainly used by commuters. No off-peak discount version of these passes is offered since there is insufficient demand; commuters usually cannot avoid the rush hour.

=== Philippines ===
Inside Metro Manila, the Unified Vehicular Volume Reduction Program, popularly known as the "number coding scheme", is implemented by the Metropolitan Manila Development Authority. The program stipulates that vehicles are prohibited from plying all roads within the metropolis, depending on the last digit of their license plates and on the day of the week.

The vehicles are banned from 7 am to 7 pm. Unlike the public vehicles, the private vehicles have a five-hour window exception which runs from 10 am to 3 pm. However, the cities of Makati and San Juan do not implement the five-hour window.

This table shows the license plates with numbers ending with its corresponding days:

Ending in	Every
1 and 2	Monday
3 and 4	Tuesday
5 and 6	Wednesday
7 and 8	Thursday
9 and 0	Friday

Exempted from the program are motorcycles, school buses, shuttle buses, ambulances, fire engines, police cars, military vehicles, those carrying a person needing immediate medical attention, and vehicles with diplomatic license plates.

On the other hand, in other places, there are certain policies the municipal or city government are proposing or has implemented for the whole municipality or city.

While most schools are open, peak hours in rapid transit trains on Manila Metro Rail Transit System and Manila Light Rail Transit System, and in commuter trains on Philippine National Railways are 6-9 am and 4-8 pm.

=== Singapore ===
In Singapore, there is a free travel scheme before 7:45 am and 50 cent discount between 7:45 am and 8 am, which applies only for exits, not entries, at the 18 CBD stations. This is an attempt to encourage commuters' travel on the MRT outside the crowded weekday morning peak. Electronic Road Pricing is intended to discourage driving between 7:30 am and 8 pm. In addition, employees were given travel incentives through Travel Smart programme. Peak hours are defined as follows: 7:30–9:30 am and 5–8 pm, with different times for terminal stations.

=== United Kingdom ===
In London, Peak Day Travelcards allow travel at all hours. Off-peak Day Travelcards are 20–50% cheaper but are valid for travel only after 9:30 am and on weekends. This is an attempt to encourage commuters' travel on the London Underground, Docklands Light Railway, buses, and trams outside of the crowded weekday morning peak. There is a similar system on Transport (Bus and Tyne and Wear Metro) in the Newcastle upon Tyne area. In London, congestion charges are intended to discourage driving between 7 am and 6 pm.

In Manchester, the Metrolink light rail system offers single, return and 'Metromax' daysaver tickets at a reduced price when they are purchased after 9:30 am. This incentive is designed to lure passengers into avoiding the daily crowded conditions at Metrolink stations during rush hour.

For 16–25 Railcard holders, the offer of one-third off ticket prices is valid only after 10 am (unless a minimum fare is paid) or weekends. This restriction does not apply in July and August, the main summer holiday season.

For other Railcards, other restrictions apply; for example, the Family Railcard and Network Railcard cannot be used for peak journeys within London and south-east England.

In 2025, the Scottish government removed peak rail fares from ScotRail trains. This followed a pilot scheme introduced by the Scottish Greens in 2023.

=== United States ===
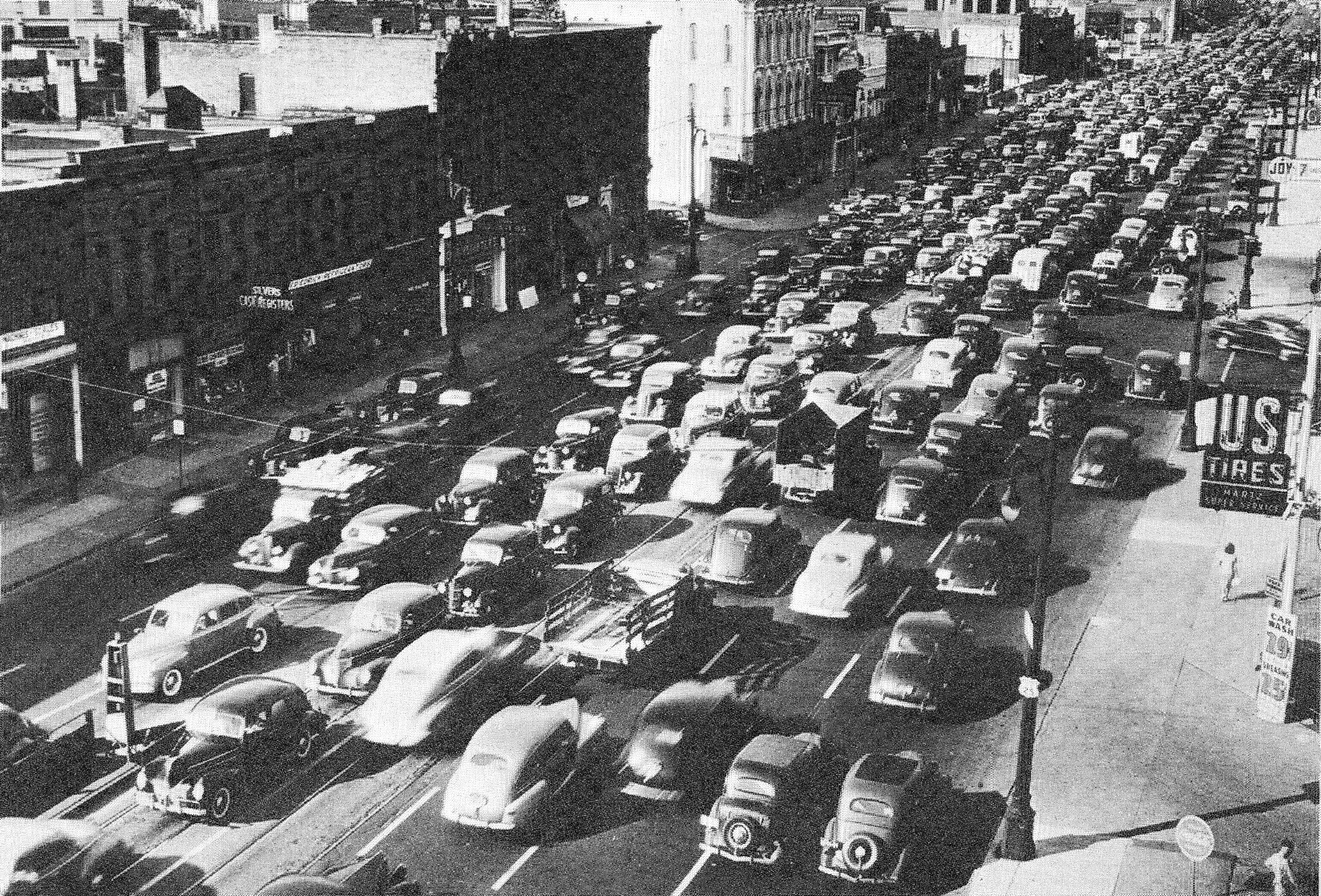
Heavy rush hour congestion on US 25 along Gratiot Avenue in Detroit in the 1940s

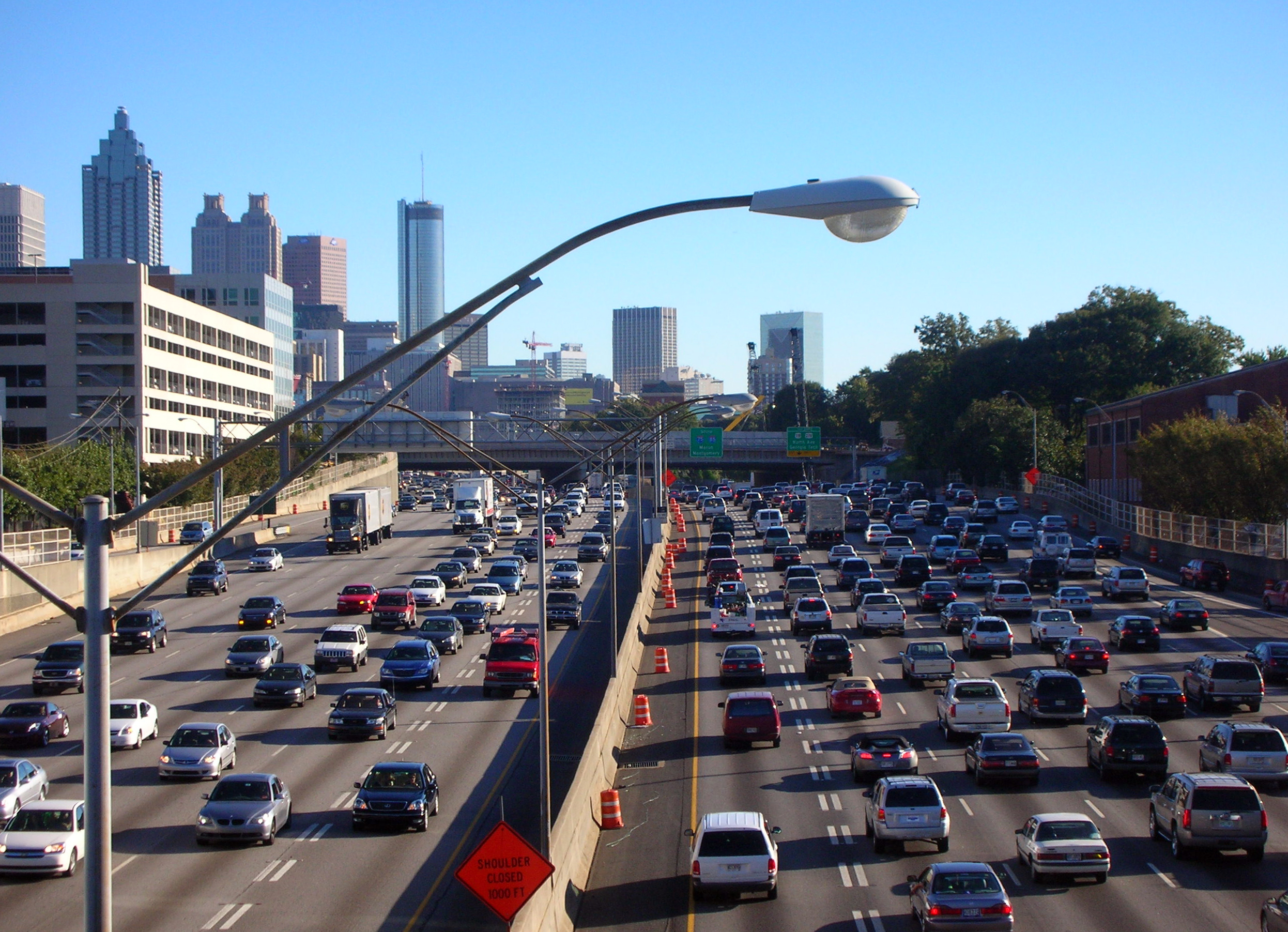
Traffic in Atlanta during rush hour

Efforts to manage transportation demand during rush hour periods vary by state and by metropolitan area. In some states, freeways have designated lanes that become HOV (High-Occupancy Vehicle, aka car-pooling) only during rush hours, while open to all vehicles at other times. In others, such as the Massachusetts portion of I-93, travel is permitted in the breakdown lane during this time. Several states use ramp meters to regulate traffic entering freeways during rush hour. Transportation officials in Colorado and Minnesota have added value pricing to some urban freeways around Denver, the Twin Cities, and Seattle, charging motorists a higher toll during peak periods.

Transit agencies such as Metro-North serving New York City often charge riders a higher "peak fare" for travel during the morning and evening rush hour.

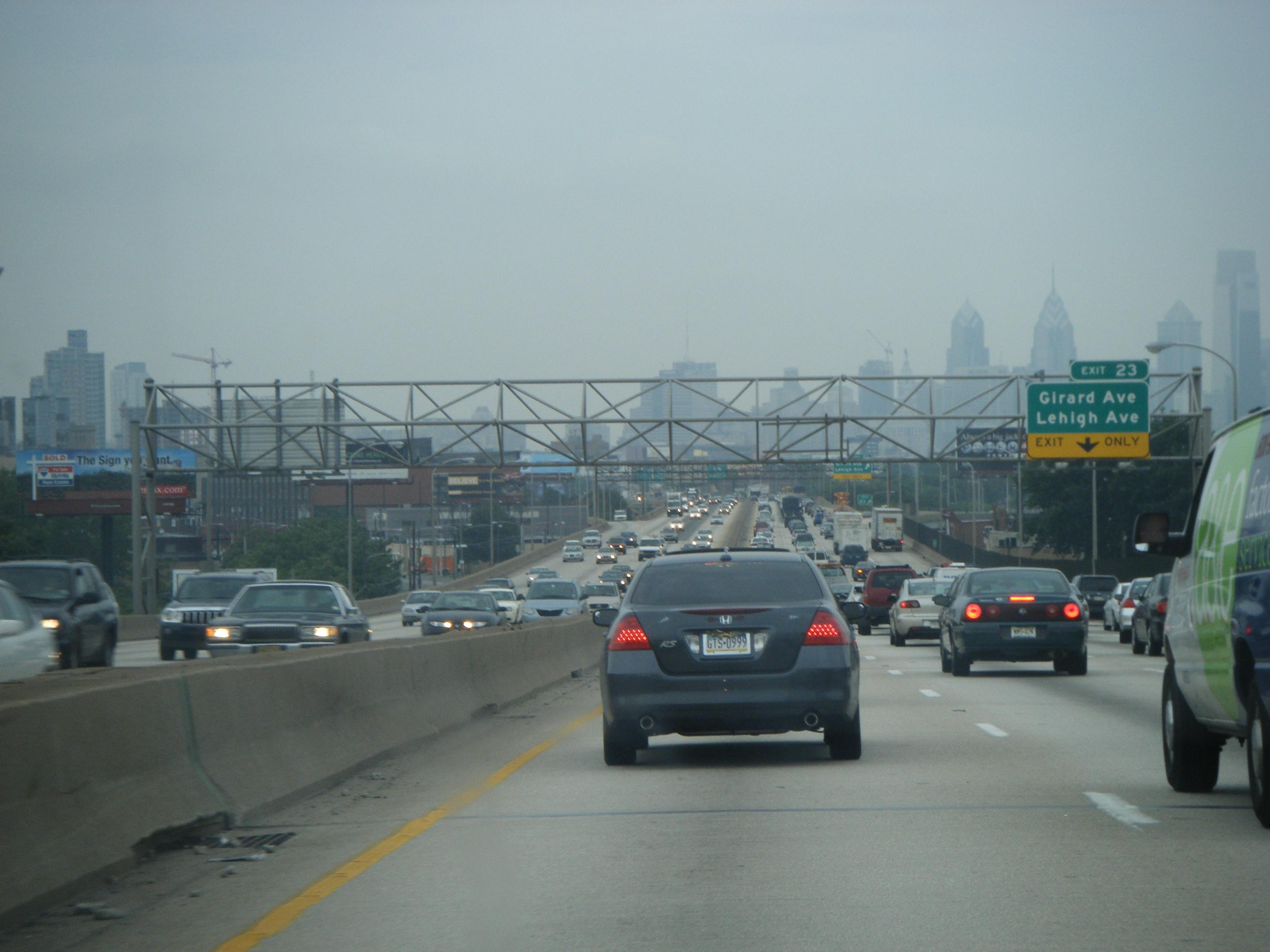
Traffic heading into Philadelphia on Interstate 95 during the morning rush hour

Heavy traffic within the larger Greater Boston region was addressed with the Big Dig project, which temporarily improved expressway traffic.

== Third rush hour ==
The term "third rush hour" has been used to refer to a period of the midday in which roads in urban and suburban areas become congested due to numerous people taking lunch breaks using their vehicles. These motorists often frequent restaurants and fast food locations, where vehicles crowding the entrances cause traffic congestion.

== See also ==
- Carpool
- Congestion pricing
- High occupancy vehicle lane
- Road space rationing
- Road traffic control
- Traffic wave
- Ramp meter

== Notes ==
a. Crowding levels defined by the Ministry of Land, Infrastructure, Transport and Tourism:

100% — Commuters have enough personal space and are able to take a seat or stand while holding onto the straps or hand rails.
150% — Commuters have enough personal space to read a newspaper.
180% — Commuters must fold newspapers to read.
200% — Commuters are pressed against each other in each compartment but can still read small magazines.
250% — Commuters are pressed against each other, unable to move.
