= Route capacity =

Maximum occupancy of a route in a given time

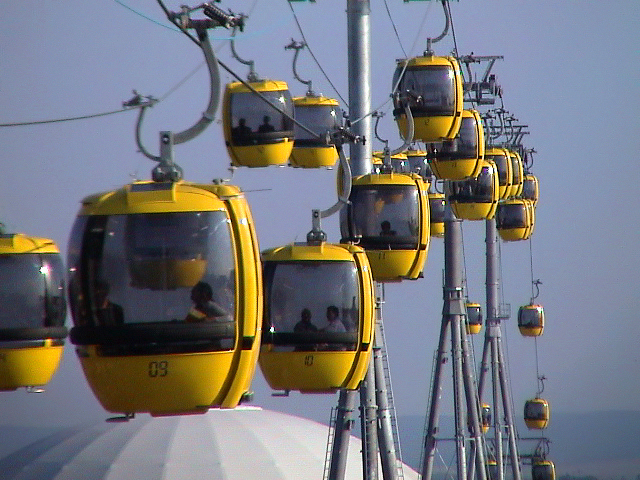
Gondola lift, Hanover, 2000

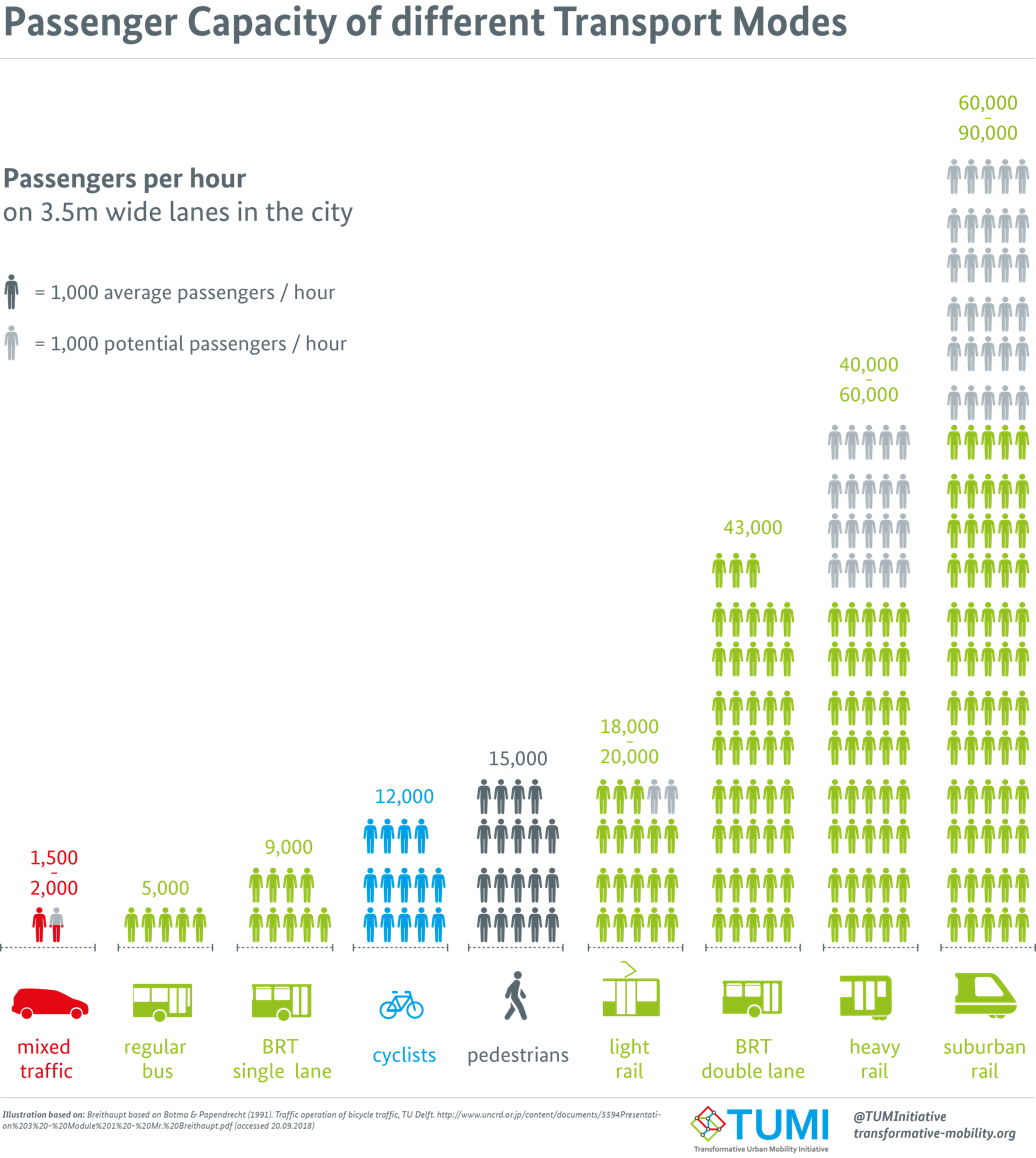
Passenger Capacity of different Transport Modes

Route capacity is the maximum number of vehicles, people, or amount of freight that can travel a given route in a given amount of time, usually an hour. It may be limited by the worst bottleneck in the system, such as a stretch of road with fewer lanes. Air traffic route capacity is affected by weather. For a metro or a light rail system, route capacity is generally the capacity of each vehicle, times the number of vehicles per train, times the number of trains per hour (tph). In this way, route capacity is highly dependent on headway. Beyond this mathematical theory, capacity may be influenced by other factors such as slow zones, single-tracked areas, and infrastructure limitations, e.g. to useful train lengths.

== Overview ==
Any assessment of the effectiveness of a transport network includes a calculation of what capacity is used, how it is used, and whether it is used effectively. For instance, overloaded routes may need to be upgraded, or capacity provided by other routes. Unused capacity can represent an opportunity to move more people or goods: as the capacity exists no additional investment is needed. Many transport networks have unused capacity.

External factors affect route capacity in different ways. Severely overcrowded highways will reduce the capacity of bus services. Severe snowfalls will reduce the capacity of highways and freeways, and high winds will make landing and departing airports difficult. In many cases route capacity will vary day to day depending on external factors. Rail systems are more rarely affected by external factors.

Routes can become congested where only a fraction of routes can accept certain traffic types. For example, a road may have a low bridge that restricts the height of any trucks (lorries), or a rail line may be unable to accept wagons loaded beyond a certain axle load. This will result in any route that can accept a wider range of vehicles being congested, and other more restrictive routes be underutilised. Rail traffic between the US and Mexico is limited by the types of vehicles, especially grain wagons, and as 2009 the only routes that could accept newer rail wagons passed through Texas.

Bottlenecks play a large role in determining route capacity. Along any route the capacity is limited to the point with the lowest capacity, and long routes may have their capacity compromised by one bottleneck. Where more vehicles enter a route than a single bottleneck can accept, then the route will be free of congestion at all points except at the bottleneck. For this reason bottlenecks are often the focus of transport improvement projects.

== Application to railways ==
Route capacity is often calculated and applied in the management and design of rail systems. For railways with very high passenger loads, the maximum possible route capacity is an important factor. A common unit for route capacity is people per hour (pph), which for metro style systems can be as high as 80,000. Route capacity can also be expressed as number of vehicles per hour, such as 16 trains per hour (tph). Route capacities in rail lines with two tracks are almost always the same in either direction.

The maximum speed or average speed of rail traffic will have no impact on the route capacity where all train services are of the same type, and the stopping patterns are the same. Whilst slower trains will mean passengers take longer to reach their destination, the number of trains moving past a specific point will remain the same. Route capacity at a particular period of time can be observed by an observer standing on a station platform. A slower rail system will require more rolling stock to maintain a high throughput of trains. The speed of traffic will affect the required headway between trains (it is not simply proportional to the speed) and will thus affect the route capacity.

In calculating route capacity it is important to consider practical considerations. Many railways will wish to operate at the maximum capacity for hours on any given day, and the theoretical capacity is not sustainable for more than a few trains. A reduced level of capacity, which can be maintained for hours, is often calculated. A railway that operates at close to the level of theoretical capacity for extended periods will have lower punctuality (fewer trains arriving when timetabled).

Route capacity depends on the number of passengers using a system, if only because this will affect the length of station stops. Much of the route capacity in an existing rail system will be used for existing timetabled rail movements. This is described as used capacity. What capacity remains to be allocated to additional trains is called available capacity.

Increasing route capacity for a rail system requires substantial investment in infrastructure. Increasing route capacity for a railway from, for example, 12 trains per hour, to 20 per hour, can be a very substantial project requiring substantial budgets.

Rail capacity is often less affected by the weather than route capacity for aircraft. However it can be affected by e.g. snow blocking the line, or by buckled rails at high temperatures.

=== Calculating route capacity ===
There are two main methods of calculating route capacity; using the method outlined in UIC 406, and by using headways. The International Union of Railways produces documents on a variety of rail related topics, and published a leaflet on rail capacity. This leaflet provides a method of calculating route capacity based on the creation of paths through a rail route. The number of paths for a "standard" train is created, and then the train paths added. The total number of trains that can potentially enter the route, and leave it, as well as the actual number, can then be determined.

The classic formula for the calculation of a route capacity from a headway is:

$\text{route capacity}=\frac{1}{\text{headway}}$	1

For example, a headway of 4 minutes (= 4/60 hours) translates into a route capacity of 15 trains per hour.

=== Reducing route capacities by mixing different types of rail services together ===
Route capacity is maximised for any rail system when all the rail traffic is the same type. Mixing different types of trains, or even different stopping patterns, will result in a substantial reduction of capacity. Where different types of trains are mixed together this is sometimes called heterogeneity. In this context different types of trains means those that are slower than other trains, for example, freight and passenger trains. Freight trains often accelerate and brake more slowly than passenger, and have lower top speeds. Also passenger trains that have different stopping patterns, such as a local all stops service, when mixed with a limited or express service, will result in a reduction of route capacity. Route capacity is not lost where all the trains on one route stop at all stations, but only where trains with different stopping patterns are mixed together.

=== Route capacities in different types of railways ===
Rail systems vary greatly in performance and route capacity, with metro systems having the highest capacity. Tram and light rail systems have in theory very high route capacities, but in practice many systems only achieve route capacities of 12 vehicles per hour. That said, Swanston Street in Melbourne achieves 50 trams per hour during the morning peak, an average of 72 seconds per tram. For High Speed Rail a route capacity of up to 18 trains per hour may be possible. In 1932 Sydney introduced a signalling system theoretically capable of 42 trains per hour (about every 85 seconds), but in practice only achieved 36 trains per hour during testing in the 50s. In modern times, Punggol metro line in Singapore uses a moving block system to achieve a headway of 90 seconds, so the route capacity is 40 trains per hour. The Moscow Metro achieves 40 trains an hour as well, additionally it has aimed to achieve 50 trains an hour in the future (a train every 72 seconds). Route capacity for a commuter rail system is typically around 12 to 16 trains per hour, which is lower than a metro, as the trains are longer, and the traffic is often mixed with other rail services such as freight and intercity trains. By contrast the Alameda Freight Corridor in Los Angeles has a route capacity of 150 freight trains per day, which is high in comparison to other rail freight systems, but low compared to metros.

The route capacity of freight rail systems is often limited by the terminal to which the freight is heading. Large terminals will be able to accept more freight trains, but a route capacity of 15 freight trains per hour would be very unusual.

=== Route capacities and stations ===
Stations in a railway system, and where train are required to stop to pick up or drop off passengers, serves to reduce the route capacity. This is particularly the case where trains of different stopping patterns are moving one after another through a rail system. Dwell time is the time taken from the opening of train doors at a station, to their closing again. Dwell times strongly influence route capacity in a rail system.

=== Route capacities and moving block headways ===
Many rail systems use a fixed block system for signalling. Moving block represents a new type of signalling that allows the reduction of headways, and an improvement of route capacity. Moving block is a signalling principle that exists within a signalling system called automatic train protection. Many technical problems exist with the construction of any rail line that supports moving block, as this type of signalling system requires constant communication between signalling systems and trains, which is often achieved with a train radio system (but can be achieved other ways). Another problem is the signalling system needs to know the length of any train at all times, and so an engineering system is needed on all trains that can detect all carriages and wagons within the train.

== See also ==
- Annual average daily traffic – Measurement of how many vehicles travel on a certain road
- Crush load – High passenger vehicle occupancy leading to crushing
- Environmental impact of transport
- Headway and route capacity
- Highway Capacity Manual
- Passenger car equivalent
- Passenger load factor – Capacity utilization of public transport
- Passengers per hour per direction – Measure of passenger capacity of a transportation network
- Patronage (transportation) – Number of passengers using a service
- Public transportation
- Terminal dwell time
- Traffic congestion
- Traffic flow – Study of interactions between travellers and infrastructure

=== Railway specific ===
- Moving block
- Railway signalling
- Signalling block system
- Absolute block signalling
