= Passenger load factor =

Capacity utilization of public transport

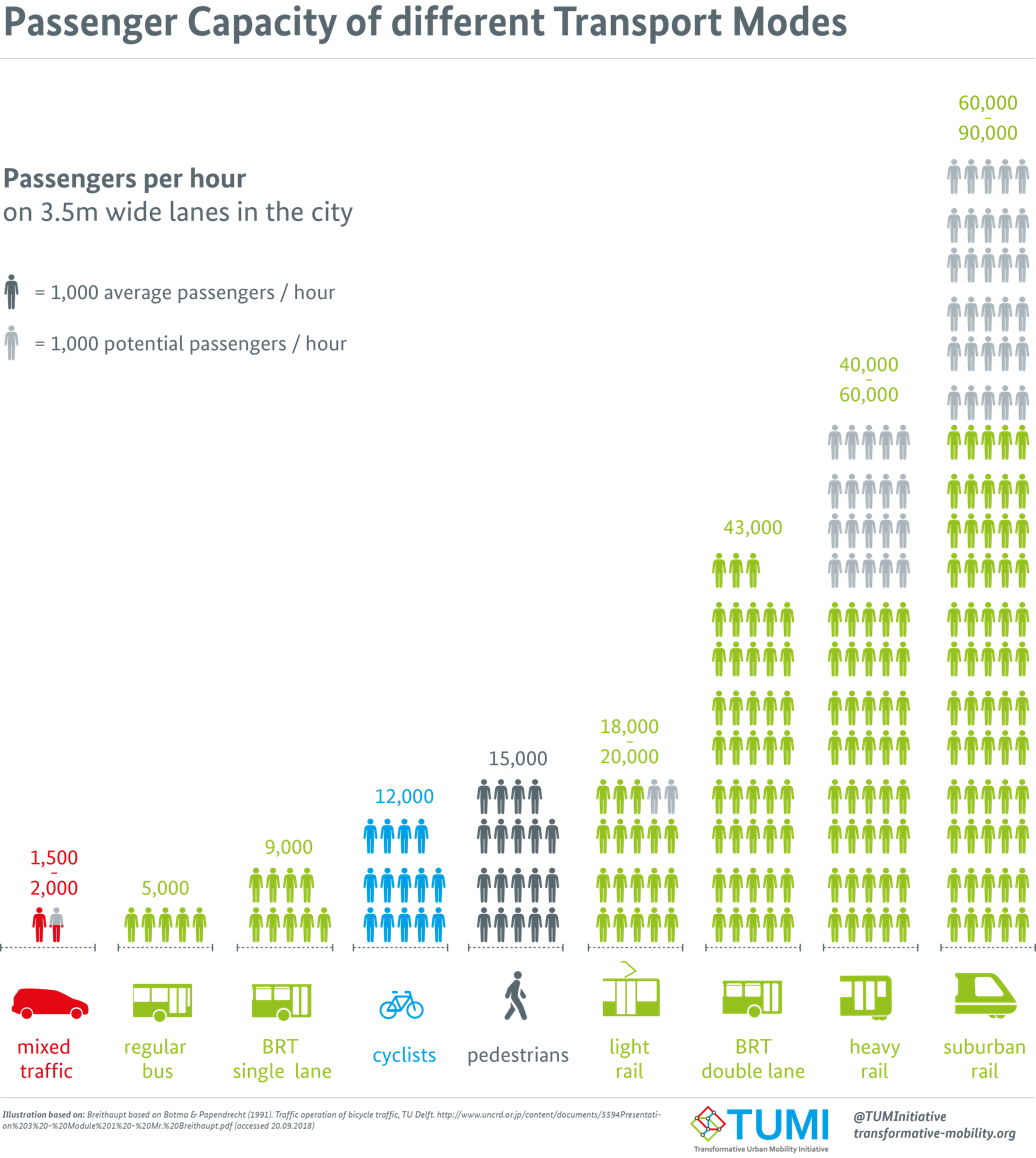
Passenger capacity of different transport modes

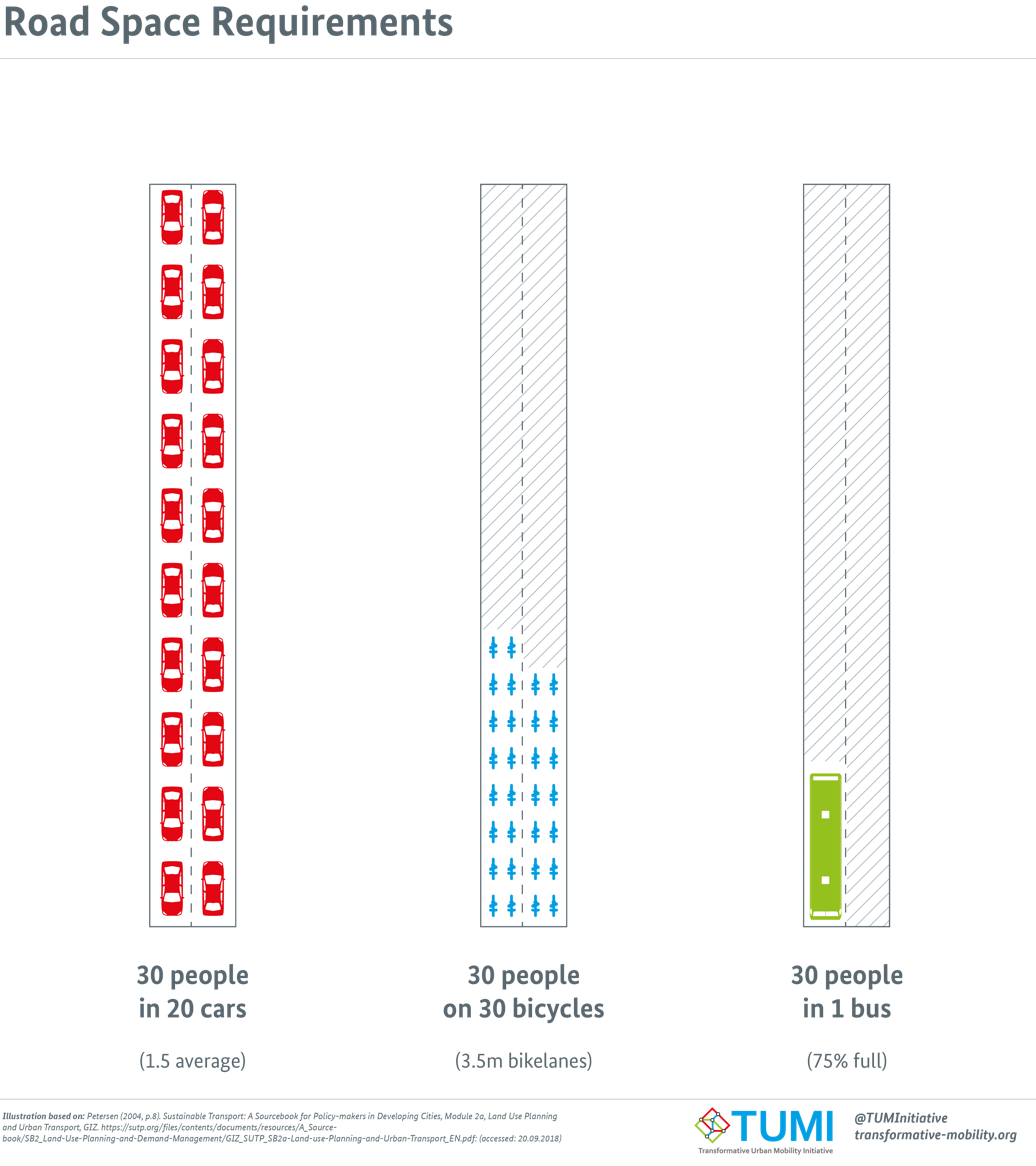
Road space requirements

Passenger load factor, or load factor, measures the capacity utilization of public transport services like airlines, passenger railways, and intercity bus services. It is generally used to assess how efficiently a transport provider fills seats and generates fare revenue.

According to the International Air Transport Association, the worldwide load factor for the passenger airline industry during 2015 was 79.7%.

== Overview ==
Passenger load factor is an important parameter for the assessment of the performance of any transport system. Almost all transport systems have high fixed costs, and these costs can only be recovered through selling tickets. Airlines often calculate a load factor at which the airline will break even; this is called the break-even load factor. At a load factor lower than the break even level, the airline will lose money, and above will record a profit.

The environmental performance of any transport mode improves as the load factor increases. The weight of passengers is normally a small part of the total weight of any transport vehicle, so increasing the number of passengers changes the emissions and fuel consumption to only a small degree. As a vehicle is more highly loaded, the fuel consumed per passenger drops, and fully loaded transport vehicles can be very fuel efficient.

Very heavy loading of a transport vehicle is described as a crush load. Crush loading is a very high level of loading where passengers are crushed against one another. Commenting in May 2017 on the United Express Flight 3411 incident, in which a passenger was forcibly removed, investor Warren Buffett said that passenger demand for cheap flights was resulting in high load factors, resulting in "a fair amount of discomfort."

== Economic role ==
=== Yield vs. load factor ===
While a high passenger load factor indicates high capacity utilization, it does not automatically guarantee profitability. Transport providers, particularly airlines, rely on yield management and dynamic pricing to balance the trade-off between load factor (the proportion of seats filled) and yield (the average revenue earned per passenger-kilometer).

An airline can achieve a 100% load factor by heavily discounting ticket prices, but if the resulting yield drops below the cost per available seat-kilometer (CASK), the flight will operate at a loss despite being full. Conversely, a lower load factor combined with high-yield business passengers or peak-time pricing can generate higher net profits. The relationship between yield, load factor, and revenue per available seat-kilometer (RASM) is expressed as:

$$\text{RASM} = \text{Yield} \times \text{Passenger Load Factor}$$

As a result, modern transport economics focuses on optimizing total revenue (RASM) rather than maximizing the passenger load factor in isolation.

== Definition and calculation ==
In public transport and commercial aviation, passenger load factor is formally defined as the ratio of revenue passenger kilometres (RPK) to available seat kilometres (ASK):

$$\text{Passenger Load Factor} = \frac{\text{RPK}}{\text{ASK}}$$

The core components of the metric are:

- Revenue passenger kilometres (RPK) (or Revenue Passenger Miles, RPM) measures actual passenger traffic by multiplying the number of revenue-paying passengers by the distance travelled in kilometres.
- Available seat kilometres (ASK) (or Available Seat Miles, ASM) measures total available passenger capacity by multiplying the total number of seats available for sale by the distance travelled in kilometres.

=== Example ===
Suppose an airline operates 5 scheduled flights on a given day over a route of 200 kilometres using aircraft configured with 100 seats. If the airline sells 60 tickets for each flight, the load factor is calculated as follows:

- RPK: $5 \text{ flights} \times 200 \text{ km} \times 60 \text{ passengers} = 60{,}000 \text{ passenger-km}$
- ASK: $5 \text{ flights} \times 200 \text{ km} \times 100 \text{ seats} = 100{,}000 \text{ seat-km}$

$$\text{Passenger Load Factor} = \frac{60{,}000 \text{ RPK}}{100{,}000 \text{ ASK}} = 0.60 = 60\%$$

Thus, during that day, the airline achieved an overall passenger load factor of 60%.

== See also ==
- Crush load
- Environmental impact of transport
- Headway – Distance between vehicles in a transit system measured in time or space
- Patronage (transportation) – Number of passengers using a service
- Route capacity – Maximum occupancy of a route in a given time
- Sustainable transport – Transport with sustainable social and environmental impacts
