= Dwell time (transportation) =

Time a vehicle spends at a scheduled stop without moving

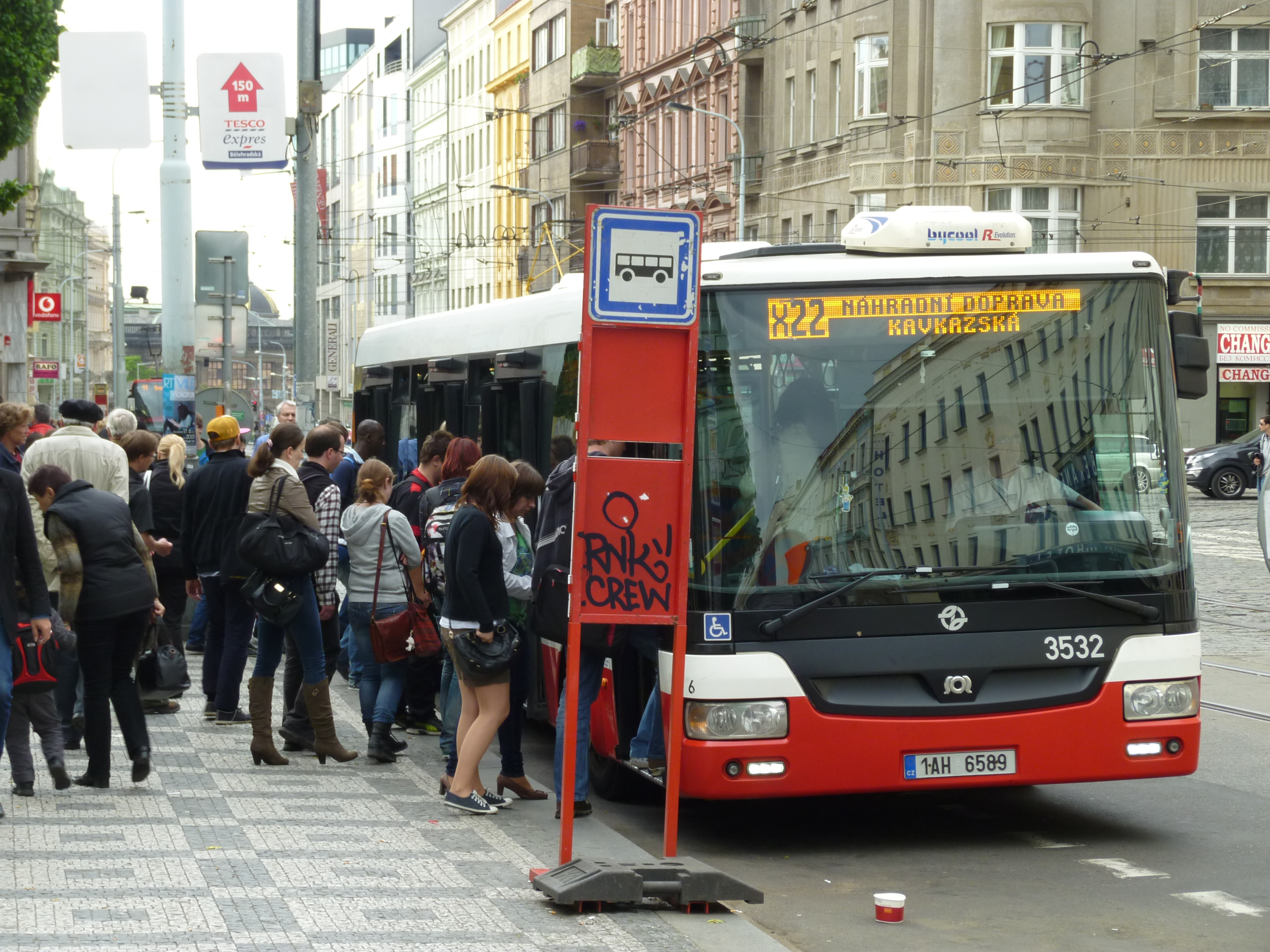
Dwell time at a bus stop in Prague, Czech Republic

In transportation, dwell time or terminal dwell time refers to the time a vehicle such as a public transit bus or train spends at a scheduled stop without moving. Typically, this time is spent boarding or deboarding passengers and baggage, but it may also be spent waiting for traffic ahead to clear, trying to merge into parallel traffic, or idling in order to get back on schedule. Dwell time is one common measure of efficiency in public transport, with shorter dwell times being universally desirable.

== Rail systems ==
Dwell times are particularly important for a rail system. Rail headways increase where the dwell times are high. Dwell times are an important focus for rail systems; A reduction in dwell time can often result in a reduced headway.

Passengers who want to board and alight from a train need time to do so. Almost always passengers disembark first, and then passengers waiting on a platform board. A variety of different factors determine how long this takes, including the size of the door on the train, the number of passengers waiting to board, or the step height from the platform to the floor of the car of the vehicle. Metro rail systems attempt to solve the problem of long dwell times by designing large numbers of doors in the rolling stock. Another solution is to increase the width of doors, but that is often ineffective as there are other bottlenecks within the rail vehicle, such as stairs, or a large number of other passengers not boarding or alighting.

The structure of the rail station can also have an effect on dwell times. Narrow platforms, structural elements in front of doors, or generally poor access in and out of the station, can all have an effect on dwell times. Passengers need to wait within the train for others to move away, so that they may alight. Older stations, especially those constructed before World War I, are often quite constrained in space, and passenger flow rates can be very poor.

One solution to the problem of long dwell times, particularly at busy stations, is to design stations with platforms on both sides of the train. This is called the Spanish Solution.

Dwell times for rail services to airports can be very long. Passengers are carrying luggage, and this makes boarding and alighting take much longer. Airport rail links have become popular since the 1970s and many new airports are constructed with high speed rail connections. Specialised trains with locations to store luggage can help reduce dwell times, but on metro rail systems, passengers with luggage can be crowded in with all other passengers.

== Causes of increased dwell times ==
The main predictor of dwell times varies widely by mode, time, and line. However, dwell times are usually affected mostly by the number of passengers needing to board and alight from a vehicle. Density imbalance along the platform and between vehicles is mainly due to human and motivational factors (minimising distance and time at the arrival).

In the case of bus transit in particular, one cause for major delays at stops is passengers using a wheelchair lift. Often, the driver will also be required to secure the passenger in addition to operating the ramp or lift.

Subway overcrowding in New York City has resulted in increased dwell times and travel delays, especially after 2014.

== Methods of minimizing dwell times ==
- Make the vehicle entrance level and flush with the platform, eliminating the need for special wheelchair access apparatus/procedures.
- Expedite or eliminate fare payment at the point of entry to the vehicle. Fares may be paid before the arrival of the vehicle as is done in rapid transit systems.
- Board passengers through multiple doors (also called "all-door boarding")
- Passengers equi-distribution along the platform and between vehicles. Agent and motivation-based simulation can help to establish better architectural and behavioral (nudging) recommendations by testing a variety of hypothetical scenarios and effects.
