= Gus Schumacher (economist) =

American economist (1939–2017)

- Born: August Schumacher Jr. December 4, 1939; Lincoln, Massachusetts, U.S.
- Died: September 24, 2017 (aged 77); Washington, D.C., U.S.
- Education: Harvard University (BA); London School of Economics

August "Gus" Schumacher, Jr. (1939–2017) was an American economist and agricultural policy official. He was Vice-President of Policy at the Wholesome Wave Foundation in Bridgeport, Connecticut. He was also a member of the 21st Century Sustainable Agricultural Task Force of the National Academy of Sciences.

In 2007, Schumacher, along with Professor Robert Thompson, Gardner Professor of Agricultural Economics at Illinois, oversaw the preparation of the Task Force Report of the Chicago Council on Global Affairs, titled “Modernizing America’s Food and Farm Policy: Vision for a New Direction” (2006).

The Gus Schumacher Nutrition Incentive Program at the United States Department of Agriculture is named after him.

== Early life and education ==
Schumacher was born in Lincoln, Massachusetts, on 4 December 1939. He grew up on a farm near Lexington, Massachusetts.

Schumacher earned a degree in economics from Harvard College, studied at the London School of Economics and was a research associate in agribusiness at the Harvard Business School, where he worked with Professor Ray A. Goldberg.

== Career ==
Schumacher was a Consultant to the Food and Society Initiative at the W.K. Kellogg Foundation in Battle Creek, Michigan. He also directed the Washington operations of SJH and Company of Boston, Massachusetts, an agri-strategy firm, and served as the Contributing Agricultural Editor of Food Arts magazine

As former Under Secretary of Agriculture for Farm and Foreign Agricultural Services at the United States Department of Agriculture from 1997 to 2001, Schumacher oversaw the Farm Service Agency, the Foreign Agricultural Service, and the Risk Management Agency. He was also President of the Commodity Credit Corporation.

Prior to that appointment, Schumacher served as Administrator of USDA's Foreign Agricultural Service, worked as a senior agri-lender for the World Bank, and served as Commissioner of Food and Agriculture for the Commonwealth of Massachusetts.

Schumacher was Vice President of Policy of the Wholesome Wave Foundation of Westport, Connecticut, served on the boards of FreshFarm Markets in Washington DC, the Environmental Power Corporation, Tarrytown, New York, GrainPro, LLC of Concord, Massachusetts and Sustainable CAPE of Truro, Massachusetts.

On September 22, 2008, he was selected for the 20th Anniversary Food Arts award for outstanding service to the American food and farming system at a ceremony in New York City. In 2013 Schumacher received a Leadership Award from the James Beard Foundation.

Schumacher died September 24, 2017, in Washington, D.C., of an apparent heart attack.

=== Wholesome Wave Foundation ===
Schumacher met Michel Nischan with Food Arts Publisher Michael Batterberry, who introduced the two men. They both had common interests in local, healthful food sources and the expanding work of new refugee farmers in New England growing unique Asian vegetables. Schumacher and Nischan soon began visiting these new growers and started links between New York City, Boston, and Washington, DC restaurants to source vegetables from the refugee farmers for local chefs’ menus.

This work evolved, culminating in the formation of Wholesome Wave Foundation as a way to link other local farmers around the country to supply healthy, sustainably grown produce at farmers’ markets to under-served neighborhoods. Wholesome Wave’s “double voucher” program aimed to provide greater food access for vulnerable families dependent on SNAP (food stamp), WIC and Social Security Income.

== Legacy ==
The Gus Schumacher Nutrition Incentive Program (GusNIP) is one of USDA’s National Institute of Food and Agriculture’s five primary nutrition programs. It is named after Schumacher who served as a USDA Under Secretary of Agriculture for Farm and Foreign Agricultural Services from 1997 to 2001.
