= The Fruit & Veggie Prescription Program =

American nutrition program

The Fruit & Vegetable Prescription Program, also known as FVRx, is one of three of Wholesome Wave's programs. The program aims to provide under-served communities with fresh fruits and vegetables by allowing consumers to exchange healthcare provider-generated “prescriptions” for local fresh fruit and vegetables at participating, local farmers' markets.

== History ==
In 2010, Wholesome Wave implemented a feasibility study where a total of 246 participants were served in five New England cities through work with three healthcare partners and a statewide network of farmers markets during the 2010 farmers' market season. The CAVU foundation, Ceiling and Visibility Unlimited, sponsored the clinics that administer the Fruit & Veggie Prescription Program. The Massachusetts Department of Agriculture as well as Wholesome Wave each contributed $10,000 in seed money to the pilot program.

Wholesome Wave expanded the program during its 2011 pilot season to sites in Massachusetts, Maine, California and Rhode Island. In 2012, the program expanded to include twelve sites in seven states throughout the United States and the District of Columbia.

In July 2013, FVRx launched a four-month-long pilot that brought the program to two New York City Hospitals in Harlem and the Bronx. The pilot was run through partnership with the New York City Health and Hospitals Corporation (HHC) and was funded through a $250,000 grant from the Laurie M. Tisch Illumination Fund as part of their Healthy Food and Community Change initiative. "The Fruit and Vegetable Prescription Program — FVRx — turns local farmers markets into pharmacies," says the Wall Street Journal. "Patients receive $2 of 'Health Bucks' coupons for each member of the family, and the coupons can be used to buy fresh produce once a week. Health Bucks are redeemable at any of the city's 142 farmers markets."

== Mission and goals ==
It is the goal of Wholesome Wave's Fruit & Veggie Prescription Program to bring access to produce to at-risk consumers as 32 million Americans are currently living in food deserts with little access to grocery stores. Additionally, its mission is to fight childhood obesity in children of low-income families. Coupons amounting to a dollar a day for each member of a patient's family are prescribed to promote healthy eating.

== FVRx Process ==
For a patient and their children to participate in the program, they are enrolled by their primary care provider who then introduces them to a nutritionist. The nutritionist will then meet with the participants each month to establish a plan that will reinforce healthy eating habits within the family. After their level of need is established based on consumption habits and Body Mass Index (BMI), the family's health care provider will then distribute prescriptions of a specified number of servings of fruits and vegetables per day. These prescriptions can then be redeemed at participating farmers' markets. These prescriptions can be redeemed weekly throughout participation in the 4-6 month long program and are refilled monthly by the health care provider who will set new goals for healthy eating.
