= Food security in the Central Valley, California =

Widespread issue where most of the nation's agriculture is produced

A map of counties that are either partially or entirely within the California Central Valley

Food security in the Central Valley, California, United States, is a widespread issue. The Central Valley is where most of the state's and the nation's agriculture is produced. Despite this, many people living and working in the valley's agriculture industry experience food insecurity in some way, with contributing factors including lack of food sources, lack of healthy food choices, and income barriers. About a third of Central Valley counties' populations were documented as food insecure in 2009. Due to the lack of healthy food choices, high rates of obesity have also been found in the Central Valley.

== Demographics ==
Most farm workers are young, poor, Mexican males.

The Central Valley population contains multiple races cultures and ethnicities given its large geographic size stretching an approximate 450 miles across California. This region is home to millions of people and offers job opportunities for many. The valley spans from Redding down to Bakersfield, and is split into two regions-- the northern Sacramento Valley and the southern San Joaquin Valley — contain 19 different counties.

=== Race ===
Along with its large population size, the central Valley also has different ethnic groups within the region. Counties in the northern portion tend to have smaller Hispanic populations, while those in the central and southern regions have significantly higher proportions of Hispanic residents. This pattern reflects broader agricultural labor trends and migration histories in the region. .

=== Poverty rates ===
The national average percent of people living in poverty is 14.7%. All but three counties show percentages above the national average, with several counties having over 20% of their populations living in poverty. One county, Tulare County, has a stark 27.2% of its population living in poverty, almost double the national average.

In Fresno County, California in 2015 the total number of Hispanic families below the poverty level with and without children under eighteen was 2,613 families.

=== Farm workers/operators numbers ===
77,850 farm workers and operators were recorded in the 2012 census; however, this number is likely higher because agricultural census information may not account for undocumented workers. In 2013, it was estimated that there were 350,000 agriculture workers in California, half of which were undocumented. A California Institute for Rural Studies publication found that undocumented people were more likely to face food insecurity. Indigenous farmworkers are more susceptible to food insecurity because they often don't have access to government services that help food insecure families.

The counties with the most agricultural workers and operators were Fresno (5,838 people total), Tulare (4,931 people total), and Stanislaus (4,143).

=== Average Median Household Income ===
The average median household income in California is $55,775. The only two counties that have substantially higher median household income are El Dorado County ($75,575) and Placer County ($76,203). All other counties have lower median household incomes, with Tulare ($42,637), Tehama ($40,292), and Merced ($42,879) having the three lowest within the Central Valley.

== Accessibility issues ==
Despite varying demographics, farm workers in the Central Valley face similar challenges. Although the region is one of the largest agricultural regions in the United States, it still suffers from food accessibility issues.

=== Food Deserts ===
Food deserts are areas that do not have healthy foods available, or in some cases, any food at all. Barriers include physical distance to stores and the number of stores, but also individual and neighborhood barriers such as income and public transport availability, respectively. This problem is especially prevalent in the Central Valley, where California farm laborers are often unable to afford or physically access healthy foods. Studies done in Salinas and Fresno showed that in both places, well over a third of farmworker respondents were food insecure. The numbers are even higher with indigenous workers, of which 93% survey respondents suffer from household food insecurity. It is not uncommon for many of these workers to be undocumented, leaving them vulnerable because they have limited access government resources.

=== Food swamps ===
Food swamps are regions where sources of unhealthy foods outnumber sources of healthy, fresh foods. It describes areas in which there is not a lack of food, but areas where there are many food options that are nutritionally deficient, typically high calorie but not high quality. Populations who live in food swamps, such as the urban poor, are often unable to obtain fruits, vegetables, and other unprocessed foods. Some commonly seen components of food swamps are corner stores and fast food restaurants. Corner stores are an important feature in food swamps as they have a lot of influence on the diets of residents due to their accessibility, combined with the simultaneous inaccessibility of supermarkets. Higher numbers of corner stores have been observed in low income communities and communities with large minority populations.

Living in a food swamp can be considered a type of food insecurity since according to the USDA Economic Research Service, low food security is defined as “reduced quality, variety, or desirability of diet” with “little or no indication of reduced food intake,” and food swamps have very little quality and variety of diet. Food security encompasses both the physical availability of food, but also the choices that are or are not available.

=== Environmental justice ===
Food deserts and swamps are related to environmental justice through the subset of food justice. Many consequences arise from the food insecurity seen in the Valley, such as disproportionate impacts on certain populations, public health implications, and lack of sustainability in how food is produced and provided (i.e. conventional/industrial agriculture, farmworker rights). For example, some common public health issues in the area include obesity, overweight, poverty, and hunger. The region is very agriculturally productive but still faces hunger and obesity problems. Accessibility is a factor in health, as seen in areas without supermarkets, where people tend to rely heavily on corner stores for food, which mostly sell processed snack foods, alcohol, doughnuts, and sugary beverages. California farm workers also face increased health problems, including high blood pressure, high cholesterol, or high glucose levels, with one-fifth of male farm workers having at least two of the above. In particular, childhood obesity is prevalent; Latino children face higher rates of childhood obesity than non-Latino children. As a result, studies have prompted the creation of programs (such as the Central California Regional Obesity Prevention Program (CCROPP) and the Central Alliance with Family Farmers (CAFF)) to promote healthy eating habits and exercise.

Many Latino households in the Central Valley suffer from food insecurity in the form of limited access to fruits and vegetables. A large portion of these households are likely to have at least one family member working as a farm laborer, since the overall California farm workforce is 92% Latino, with Mexican-born workers being the vast majority. In 2013, Mexican-born workers made up 68% of farmworkers. One example of a food swamp-related consequence is how many Mexican farmworker families find their diets in America to be much more “processed” compared to their “diverse and fresh” diets back in Mexico. The Latino population has been identified as especially vulnerable to poor health, both physically and mentally, as a result of poverty and discrimination.

== See also ==
- Food security
