= Wholesome Wave =

U.S. non-profit organization

Wholesome Wave is an American nonprofit organization focused on nutrition and access to fresh food. Wholesome Wave operates two nutrition incentive programs, the Double Value Coupon Program and the Fruit & Vegetable Prescription Program, which tackle the issue of affordability for underserved consumers. The organization works with food hubs, retail outlets and convenience stores. Wholesome Wave's programs address the complex issues of food insecurity, farm viability, economic vitality of local communities, and diet-related diseases. Wholesome Wave was founded in 2007 by Michael Batterberry, Gus Schumacher and Michel Nischan.

The Obama administration named Wholesome Wave as one of five major strategy groups making a difference in the fight against childhood obesity in its "White House Task Force on Childhood Obesity Report to the President" and Guidestar's Philanthropedia named Wholesome Wave one of 18 outstanding nonprofits combatting childhood obesity.

== Wholesome Wave programs ==
Wholesome Wave programs increase access to affordable, healthy, locally grown fruits and vegetables for underserved consumers. Wholesome Wave programs work with community-based organizations in 27 states and D.C.

=== Double Value Coupon Program (DVCP) ===
Wholesome Wave's hallmark initiative is the Double Value Coupon Program (DVCP). DVCP is a national network of nutrition incentive programs that operate at farmers markets in 25 states and D.C. These programs allow federal benefit consumers—those who receive SNAP (formerly known as food stamps), Women, Infant & Children (WIC) vouchers, and Senior Farmers Market Nutrition Program (FMNP) vouchers, to receive a monetary incentive when they spend their benefits at farmers markets on locally grown produce. Consumers increase their purchase and consumption of healthy foods, farmers see increased revenue, and dollars stay within the local economy. This program was initiated in 2008 at 12 farmers' markets in California, Connecticut and Massachusetts.

==== DVCP history ====
In 2007, Gus Schumacher and John Hyde raised money to double the value of food stamps, WIC vouchers, and benefits for seniors. Schumacher, Wholesome Wave's co-founder, approached the National Watermelon Association for $5,000 to run a program at Crossroads Farmers Market. Simultaneously, Schumacher and Michel Nischan founded Wholesome Wave.

The Double Value Coupon Program was launched in 2008 at the Westport, CT farmers market with seed money for the pilot program from the Betsy and Jesse Fink Foundation. In 2009, building from successful pilot programs in 2008 and with support from a number of foundations and donors, Wholesome Wave outreach expanded the DVCP program to ten states and the District of Columbia. As of 2014, the program has expanded to include a network of more than 60 partners operating incentives programs at more than 350 markets in 25 states and the District of Columbia. As of 2013, Wholesome Wave partnered with over 60 community-based non-profit organizations.

==== DVCP in the news ====
How Double Bucks for Food Stamps Conquered Capitol Hill

=== Fruit & Vegetable Prescription Program (FVRx) ===
The Fruit and Vegetable Prescription Program is an initiative for at-risk consumers to exchange healthcare provider-generated "prescriptions" for local fresh fruit and vegetables at participating farmers' markets. Designed to measure how increased consumption of fresh produce affects critical obesity indicators, pilot programs launched at community health centers throughout Massachusetts and Maine in 2010. Healthcare providers work in conjunction with local nonprofits and Wholesome Wave to collect data on patient progress and measure success.

==== FVRx history ====
In 2010, Wholesome Wave implemented a feasibility study where a total of 246 participants were served in five New England cities through work with three healthcare partners and a statewide network of farmers markets during the 2010 farmers' market season. The CAVU foundation, Ceiling and Visibility Unlimited, sponsored the clinics that administer the Fruit & Veggie Prescription Program. The Massachusetts Department of Agriculture as well as Wholesome Wave each contributed $10,000 in seed money to the pilot program.

Wholesome Wave expanded the program during its 2011 pilot season to sites in Massachusetts, Maine, California and Rhode Island. In 2012, the program expanded to include twelve sites in seven states throughout the United States and the District of Columbia.

In July 2013, FVRx launched a four-month-long pilot that brought the program to two New York City Hospitals in Harlem and the Bronx. The pilot was run through partnership with the New York City Health and Hospitals Corporation (HHC) and was funded through a $250,000 grant from the Laurie M. Tisch Illumination Fund as part of their Healthy Food and Community Change initiative. "The Fruit and Vegetable Prescription Program — FVRx — turns local farmers markets into pharmacies," says the Wall Street Journal. "Patients receive $2 of 'Health Bucks' coupons for each member of the family, and the coupons can be used to buy fresh produce once a week. Health Bucks are redeemable at any of the city's 142 farmers markets." In 2014, the FVRx NYC HHC Pilot expanded to three hospitals in the city. The New York Times lauds the program as a "win-win endeavor."

==== FVRx process ====
For a patient and their children to participate in the program, they are enrolled by their primary care provider who then introduces them to a nutritionist. The nutritionist will then meet with the participants each month to establish a plan that will reinforce healthy eating habits within the family. After their level of need is established based on consumption habits and Body Mass Index (BMI), the family's health care provider will then distribute prescriptions of a specified number of servings of fruits and vegetables per day. These prescriptions can then be redeemed at participating farmers' markets. These prescriptions can be redeemed weekly throughout participation in the 4- to 6-month-long program and are refilled monthly by the health care provider who will set new goals for healthy eating.
