= Michel Nischan =

American chef

Michel Nischan is an American chef. A four-time James Beard Foundation Award winner, he is the cofounder and chairman of Wholesome Wave, Founder and President of Wholesome Wave, co-founder of the James Beard Foundation Chefs Boot Camp for Policy & Change along with Chefs Action Network, as well as Founder and Partner with actor Paul Newman of the former Dressing Room Restaurant. He has been an advocate for sustainability in the kitchen.

== Wholesome Wave ==
Wholesome Wave was founded in 2007 by Nischan, along with friends Michael Batterberry, and Gus Schumacher as founding board chair. It funded by Newman's Own Foundation and the Betsy and Jesse Fink Foundation, and supported in part by Grow for Good, a philanthropic initiative of Food & Wine magazine.

== Published works ==
Nischan also wrote three cookbooks: Taste Pure and Simple (Chronicle Books 2003), Homegrown Pure and Simple (Chronicle Books 2005), and Sustainably Delicious (Rodale Publishing 2010).

== Career and awards ==
Nischan's book Taste Pure and Simple won a James Beard Foundation Award in 2004. Nischan won a second Beard Award in 2008 for his work on the PBS television series Victory Garden. His most recent award was presented by the James Beard Foundation in May 2015 for Humanitarian of the Year. He is also an Ashoka fellow. He serves on the boards of the Amazon Conservation Team, the James Beard Foundation and Harvard's Center for Health and the Global Environment.
