= Food Arts =

American food industry publication

Food Arts was an American publication for food industry professionals founded in 1986 by Ariane and Michael Batterberry. It ceased publication in 2014.
