= Urban agriculture in West Oakland =

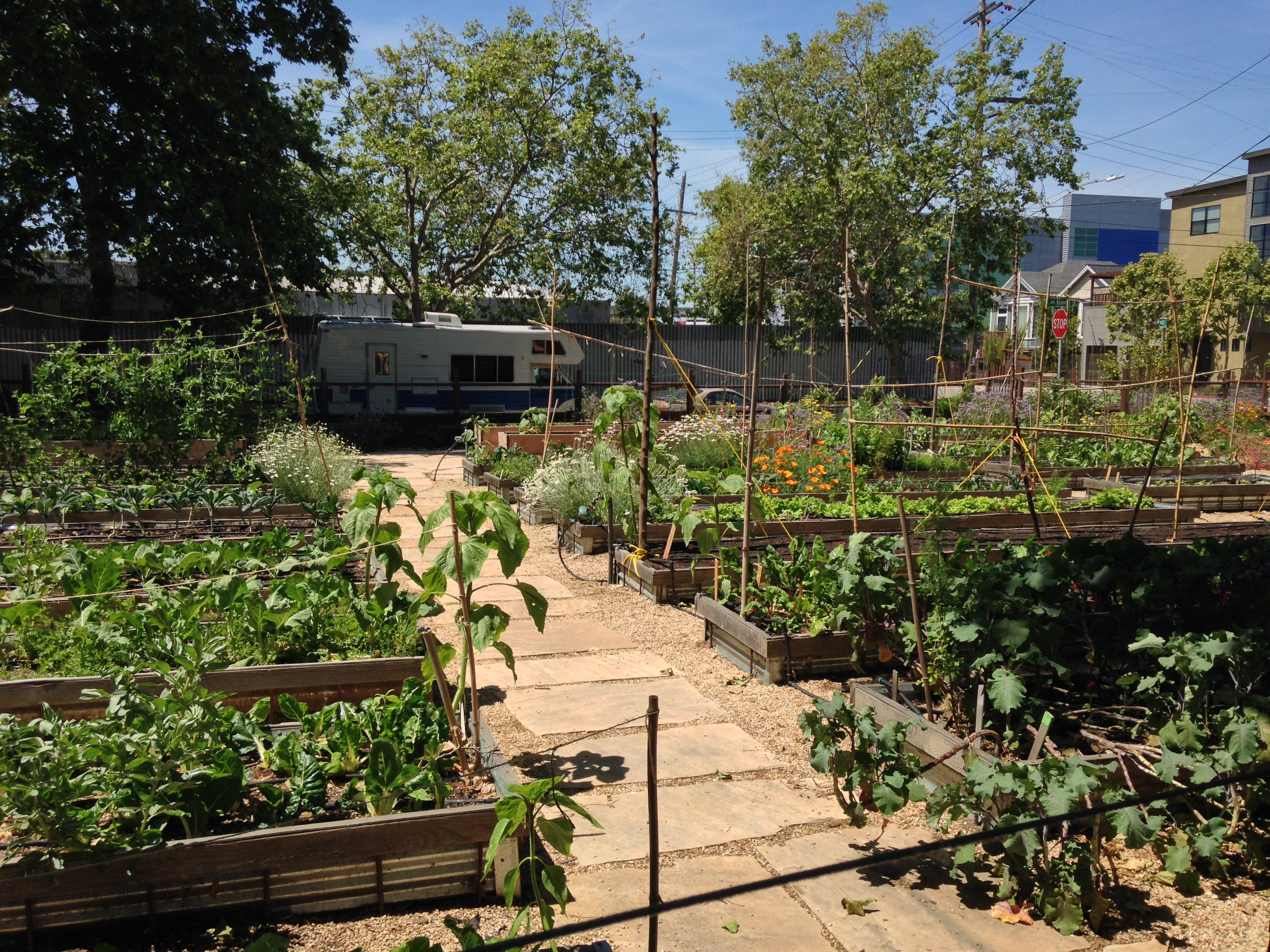
Farm plot at what was formerly City Slicker Farms

Urban agriculture in West Oakland involves the implementation of Urban agriculture in West Oakland, California.

== History ==
Urban agriculture in West Oakland has taken a radical form that can be traced back to community gardening initiatives starting in the 1970s in the cities of Berkeley and Oakland, as well as the city's rich African-American heritage. Oakland's manufacturing industry attracted many new residents during World War II. To reduce racial tension, the Oakland Housing Authority established housing projects for Black residents in West Oakland and White residents in East Oakland. With the advent of exclusionary covenants as well as redlining practiced by banks, development capital was kept out of West Oakland while the African American population had limited opportunities to rent or buy housing outside of the West Oakland neighborhood.

Poverty became rampant in West Oakland beginning in the 1960s when Alameda County's manufacturing industries decreased productivity or closed causing unemployment to rise. West Oakland evolved into a place of industrial poverty, isolated from the rest of Oakland. With a depressed economy and high crime rate, West Oakland failed to attract major retail including supermarkets, further isolating the area as a low-income community of color. According to a study by the American Planning Association, in the year 2000, African-Americans accounted for 77% of the population in West Oakland. Hispanic and white residents accounted for 14% and 9% of the population, respectively. However, most recently, West Oakland demographics have been changing as a result of gentrification spurred by a "tsunami of foreclosures" in the 2000s.

The Black Panther Party (BPP) played an important role in seeding urban agricultural practices in West Oakland. One of the BPP's social programs aimed to improve the access to healthy food for the city's black population by providing breakfast in local schools, churches and community centers. A small amount of this food came from small local gardens planted by BPP members, who drew on their previous generation's agricultural knowledge. According to Prof. Nathan McClintock, "The Panthers used gardening as a coping mechanism and a means of supplementing their diets, as well as a means to strengthen community members engaged in the struggle against oppression."

The creation of the People of Color Greening Network (PCGN) in the 1990s was a pivotal moment for urban agriculture in West Oakland. PCGN served as a vehicle for fusing social justice with urban agriculture. The group planted in empty and vacant lots in order to promote green space and bountiful gardens. Given the majority of abandoned flatlands located in West Oakland, the PCGN movement's activities began to spread most in this area. In addition, a school garden movement began in which schools around Alameda County began teaching basic gardening skills and food education.

In 1998, the city of Oakland's Mayor's office of Sustainability proposed a Sustainable Community Development Initiative as part of a global initiative towards sustainable development. This initiative called for a sustainable approach to an economic development program with increased education within the community, and the PCGN's expansion of urban agriculture served as a vehicle to achieve this goal. Due to West Oakland's lack of access to nutritious and healthy food, many other organizations including the PCGN demanded the plan include strategies for creating a sustainable impact within the local food system. City Slicker Farms is one of those organizations and was founded in response to the multitude of empty urban lots In West Oakland that could be used to produce nutritious food for the surrounding community. Through land donations from local residents of West Oakland, mainly Willow Rosenthal, a network of urban farmers and farm stands was created and began to flourish. The land donated by Willow Rosenthal was sold by City Slicker Farms. Currently, City Slicker Farms operates one garden, the West Oakland Farm Park, which no longer has a farm stand.

In 2005, Mayor Jerry Brown joined forces with mayors from cities around the world and signed the UN World Environment Day Urban Environmental Accords, pledging to become a more sustainable city by the year 2012. This gave rise to many Oakland City Council Resolutions, such as Resolution No. 76980 and Resolution No. 80332, both of which helped develop a Food Policy Council (FPC) to achieve the city's intended goals. The FPC has teamed up with organizations like the Health for Oakland's People & Environment (HOPE) Collaborative, which works with city leaders and departments as well as local grassroots organizations like City Slicker Farms, in order to improve the health and wellness of Oakland's residents that experience social inequities.

The Oakland Food Policy Council held its first meeting in September 2009 to organize a "Plan for Action" in favor of the proliferation of urban agriculture in Oakland. In January 2011, the council translated their "Plan for Action" into multiple languages in order to reach out to the entire minority population and urban agriculture community so that issues concerning land access were clearly understood and that these minorities were not taken advantage of. On March 15, 2011, the Oakland City Council adopted new residential and commercial zones for the entire city. The new zones allowed "Crop and Animal Raising Agricultural Activities" with approval of a Conditional Use Permit in all residential and commercial areas in the city as an interim measure until the City conducted a comprehensive update to address all aspects of urban agriculture.

At the close of 2011, they helped connect the community with agencies such as the Department of Human Services to harvest a more responsible and local food system, with attempts to help organize a Food Policy Council for the state of California. By the year 2012 they developed a Food Justice Curriculum to be piloted by the HOPE Collaborative, as well as a system of fresh food vendors through helping them to abide by stringent state policies. This helped to increase the availability of, and access to, fresh food within the city of Oakland. Their mission continues today with goals of ensuring food security in Oakland while promoting greater "food literacy" within a "closed-loop" system that promotes the use of renewable resources and food scrap composting.

== Urban agriculture and the West Oakland Food System ==
There are a number of organizations involved in the urban agricultural movement in West Oakland. They strive to fight food injustice in West Oakland by improving many parts of West Oakland's food system. Collectively, they focus on distributing locally grown food to West Oakland residents, educating West Oakland residents about urban gardening and the benefits of eating a healthy diet, and changing organizational models that allow the urban agriculture movement to flourish.

=== Oakland Based Urban Gardens (OBUGs) ===
OBUGs maintains gardens dedicated to in-school classes and after school activities in which children grow and use organic vegetables through gardening, cooking, and nutrition and the environmental education. OBUGS has also established mentoring relationships with Oakland youth.

=== Mandela MarketPlace ===
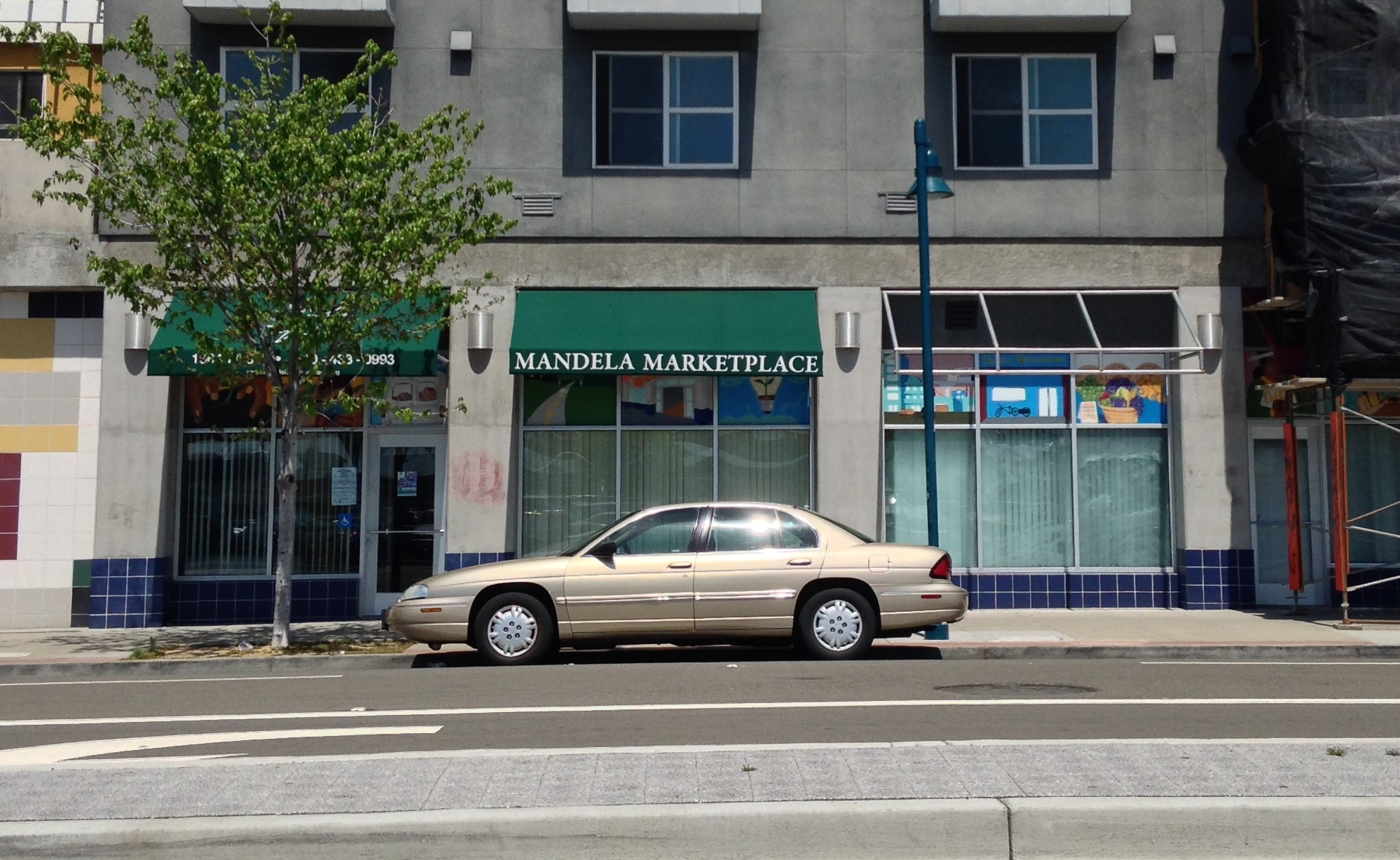
Mandela MarketPlace entrance

Mandela MarketPlace is a non-profit organization operating in West Oakland that provides West Oakland residents with healthier, more sustainable, and locally grown, produce. They work in partnership with West Oakland residents to increase education about sustainable and healthy diets and to address systemic economic and health inequities. Mandela MarketPlace connects local farmers from various Bay Area counties with local residents interested in purchasing fresh produce. In doing so, they cut out the middleman that stands between farmers and the consumers who purchase their produce, which allows for affordable and healthier food to be purchased by West Oakland residents. They also kickstarted the Mandela Foods Cooperative and the Healthy Neighborhood Store Alliance which both strive to combat West Oakland's food desert by increasing local access to produce including distributing produce to places where it is typically unfound such as local liquor stores.

=== Phat Beets Produce ===
Phat Beets Produce is a food justice collective that started in North Oakland in 2007. They "started as a means to close the gap between small farmers’ of color that lack market outlets and urban communities that lack access to healthy, affordable, culturally appropriate food." They focus on providing economic opportunities for "historically disenfranchised" farmers by initiating distribution channels for them to sell produce to Oakland residents. Phat Beets helps guide local youth through the "dietary sovereignty" program, an obesity program at Children's Hospital Oakland. They also strive to stimulate the local economy by incubating sustainable businesses related to urban agriculture.

=== City Slicker Farms ===
City Slicker Farms works with the West Oakland community and enables them to grow healthy organic foods for themselves and other West Oakland residents. Their mission of increased food security and education was sparked by the high prevalence of empty and vacant lots in the flatlands of West Oakland. In 2010, they were granted 4 million dollars through California Proposition 84 in order to develop an urban green space in West Oakland, which is their latest project in helping low-income communities achieve food security. Their goal is to provide the resources necessary for West Oakland residents to develop urban farms that sustain the local produce needs of the community. They expand educational opportunities and distribution networks through three main programs which include the Community Market Farms Program, the Backyard Garden Program, and the Urban Farming Education Program. These programs maintain local community farm stands that increase the distribution of fresh food, assist the community in starting their own backyard gardens, as well as host seminars on food education.

=== OUSD The Center ===
Opened in August 2021, Oakland Unified School District's Central Kitchen, Instructional Farm and Education Center (also known as The Center) provides environmental and agricultural education to students from all over Oakland. It is located at 2850 West Street, between Martin Luther King Boulevard and West Street, the former site of Marcus Foster Elementary School. Students visit The Center for hands-on learning about food, education, health and sustainability. The Center includes OUSD's Central Kitchen, which provides approximately 75,000 meals per week to students across the district. The Education Center includes a culinary classroom / instructional kitchen, a classroom for meetings and trainings, and a larger 'play classroom' for hands-on learning. The Instructional Garden & Farm includes over 20 raised beds, a greenhouse, and an outdoor pizza oven. The Center hosts workshops where educators and students learn about eating in season and about growing local foods.

=== Planting Justice ===
"Planting Justice is a non-profit organization based in Oakland, CA dedicated to food justice, economic justice, and sustainable local food systems." Planting Justice has a "door-to-door organizing model" that focuses on spreading food education, increasing their volunteer base, and decentralizing their funding base. They focus heavily on educating Oakland residents about food related issues and hold weekly workshops focusing on various subjects such as "food justice, culinary arts, and permaculture design". These workshops provide a hands on education that both motivates students and equips them with the necessary tools for creating and sustaining urban gardens. Planting justice also has a Create Green Jobs initiative that promotes the notion that green jobs need not only exist in the industrial sector. The initiative promotes sustainable and local urban farming as a means to economic growth. "[Their] green jobs program will provide dignified jobs to disenfranchised urban residents that make them feel proud and of benefit to their community."

=== People’s Grocer ===
People's Grocer launched the Mobile Market, a truck that drove around the neighborhood selling fresh foods, an urban farm, a CSA program, as well as nutrition, health and job training programs. In 2012, they were working to establish a full-service grocery store called People's Community Market.

== Current initiatives and legislation ==
In November 2010, City Slicker Farms, a West Oakland urban agriculture company, was awarded a 4 million dollar grant for which they are using to develop an urban farm and park. They are developing a 1.4-acre lot in West Oakland in which they will have a community garden, chicken coop, fruit orchard, and a vegetable plot. When completed, the space will be completely open to the public. They received this grant because of California's Prop 84 which passed in 2006. Prop 84, titled the "Water Quality, Safety and Supply. Flood Control. Natural Resource Protection. Park Improvements. Bonds. Initiative Statute.", will generate 5.4 billion dollars to fund projects focused on "statewide park development and community revitalization," harvesting clean drinking water and protecting water resources, protecting natural resources, and enhancing public access to natural resources.

On September 28, 2013, California State Assembly Bill 551 was approved. This Bill is known as the "Urban Agriculture Incentive Zones Act" and it provides a framework for local cities and counties to come into contractual agreement with city residents in providing them with "vacant, unimproved, or otherwise blighted lands" to use as small-scale farms. This Bill was enacted at the state level in California and requires California's urban cities and counties to implement it locally. If approved in Oakland, it allows the city to legally reserve unwanted lands to be specifically used for urban farming purposes. The city of Oakland would be able to enter into 10 year contractual agreements with its residents allowing them to use these lands for farming on "[rates] based on the average per-acre value of irrigated cropland in California." Each county and/or city must opt into the Urban Agriculture Incentive Zones Act, and as of now the city of Oakland has not enacted it; at the end of 2013 Oakland's city council was considering enacting the bill. If enacted by the city council, it will "improve [the] financial viability" of urban farming in West Oakland and Oakland in general.
