= Food swamp =

Urban environment with unhealthy food options

Food swamps are often determined by a disproportionate ratio of fast food to supermarkets.

A food swamp is an urban environment with an abundance of several non-nutritious food options such as corner stores or fast-food restaurants. The term was coined in 2009 by Donald Rose and his colleagues at the University of Michigan in a report on food access in New Orleans.

The concept is comparable to that of a food desert. It is generally believed that those in a food desert have poor local access to nutritious food sources, while those in a food swamp have few grocery stores but easy local access to non-nutritious food. However, areas that have adequate access to healthy food options while still having an overwhelming amount of unhealthy food available are also considered food swamps. Food swamps may even be more widespread than food deserts, as suggested by some research, or overlap with food deserts as they exist in various regions around the world.

One definition gives a general ratio of four unhealthy options for each healthy option. The term was first coined by researchers conducting longitudinal studies of the link between increased access to grocery stores and rising obesity rates. This study found that even with new access to local grocery stores, the proportion of convenience stores and fast food to a single grocery store did not shift food choices nor obesity rates. This indicates a distinction between food swamps and food deserts. According to researchers, food swamps are better measures for obesity rates. Food swamps are associated with varying health outcomes across different demographic groups, with Black and Brown communities experiencing disproportionately poorer health indicators.

== Food marketing, accessibility, and health outcomes ==
=== Marketing and behavior ===
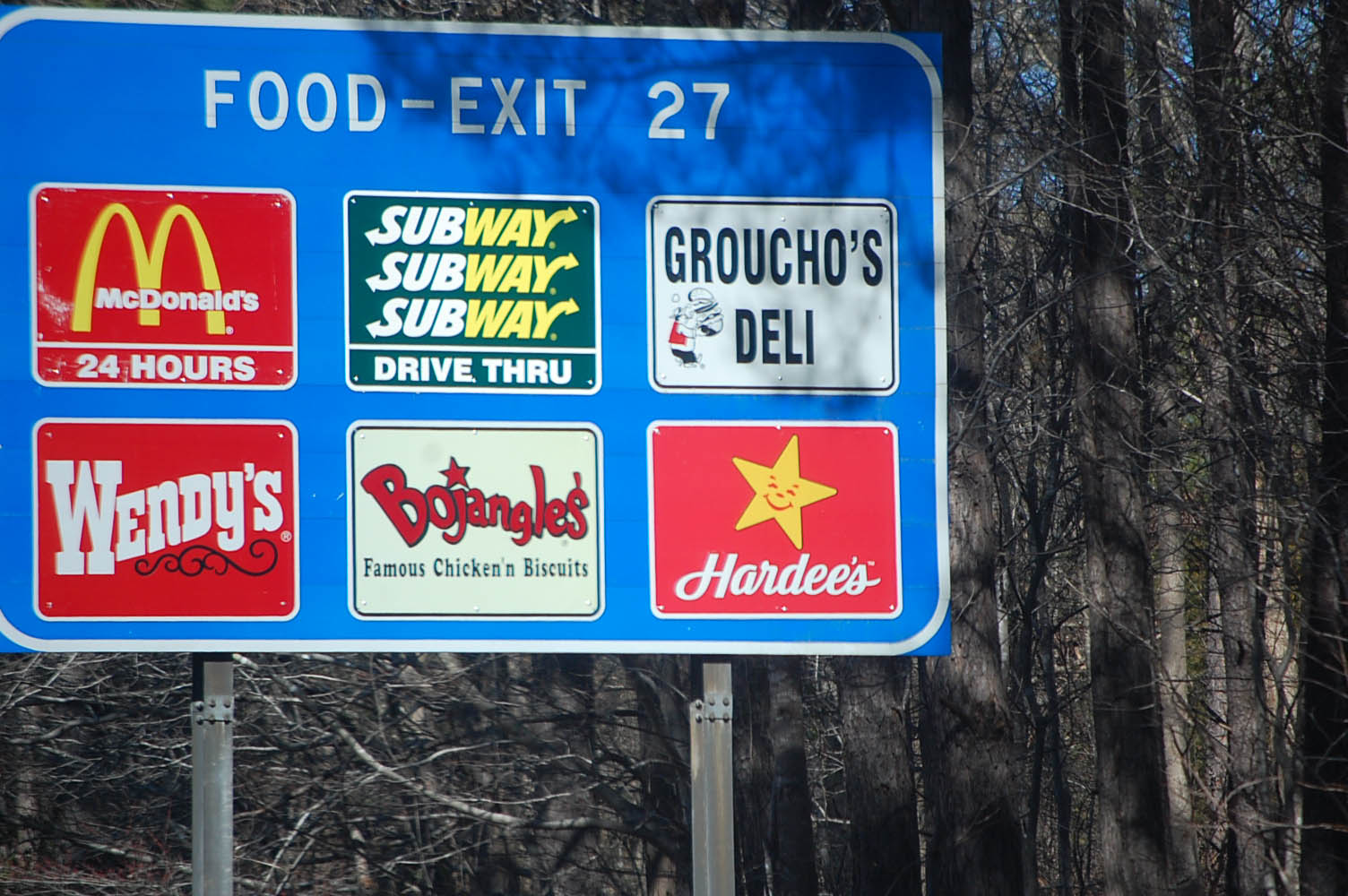
Road sign advertising multiple fast-food restaurant options using attractive display advertising design elements.

Researchers are investigating if there are links between marketing practices and food swamp prevalence. Food swamps are characterized by an abundance of unhealthy food options, often accompanied by targeted advertising. For example, the visibility of high-calorie foods has been identified as one of the marketing tools using psychology in food swamps to encourage the consumption of these prevalent unhealthy food items.

Food swamps also impact food choice. Exposure to fast food marketing has been found to be associated with people having a greater preference for the brands they see being marketed. Evidence shows that children often select menu items based on promotional materials or images for food.

=== Accessibility ===
The presence of a food swamp can impact the behavior of individuals living in the designated area. The expensive cost of food can limit people's ability to get healthy food, which can cause many people feel like they have to rely on the cheaper and more non-nutritious options in their surrounding area.

One of the factors that may better explain this occurrence is the surrounding neighborhood of a food swamp. In many areas designated as food swamps, there exists a lack of transportation options to grocery stores that carry a more nutritious array of food options. This means that food options are still severely limited, especially when the nearest convenience store, bodega, or fast food restaurant is at walking distance and consumes the least amount of time. This leaves populations with less ability to travel outside of a swamp.

=== Health ===
Food swamps have positive, statistically significant effects on adult obesity rates, especially in those areas where the majority of residents do not have access to personal or public transportation, and have disproportionate health impacts on low-income minorities. This environment is found in areas with strong corporate or industrial influence and is becoming a global phenomenon. Research also suggests a positive correlation between obesity rates and the ratio of unhealthy to healthy food options. This is a consequence of fast-food options available in food swamps containing a high number of calories but a lower number of nutrients. This effect on obesity rates has reportedly also been associated with higher obesity-related cancer mortality rates.

Some data also suggests that young adults living in close proximity to fast-food restaurants demonstrated higher incidence of type 2 diabetes. This has resulted in higher hospitalization rates for people with diabetes who live in a food swamp designated area. These dire health outcomes expose communities to vulnerabilities such as less optimal immune system functions that can impact the body's ability to combat sickness and disease.

== Demographic disparities ==
=== Race and ethnicity ===
In 2011, fast food access was assessed and it was found that fast-food restaurants are more likely to be located in areas with higher concentrations of ethnic minorities than whites in the United States. Racial-ethnic minorities have been shown to more frequently reside near unhealthy fast-food retailers than others. A survey study in 2020 found that non-Hispanic Black Americans are more likely to report living in a food swamp than other ethnic groups.

Obesity rates have been found to be higher among African American and Latino populations compared to white populations, reflecting racial disparities in health outcomes. In Baltimore, Maryland, researchers found that young African Americans girls who were determined to be living in food swamps ate more snack foods and desserts than those who did not live in areas not categorized as food swamps, increasing their risk for obesity.

=== Socioeconomic status ===
Generally, differential barriers faced by low-income communities are mentioned as important influences on food swamp characterization. A 2017 study based on cross-sectional data from the 2009 United States Department of Agriculture suggested that food swamps can exist across communities with varying socioeconomic circumstances. However, the study also indicated that food swamps are more likely to be prevalent in counties with uneven distributions of income. In 2019, a study in Edmonton, Canada also suggested low-income groups have been found to more likely live in areas that have an abundance of unhealthy fast-food options. The results observed across various locations suggest that further investigation is needed to clarify the correlation between socioeconomic status and the prevalence of food swamps.

== Global phenomena ==
Some narratives purport that food deserts occur primarily in North America. However, food swamps have been identified in areas outside of the continental Americas.

Studies find that in Mexico, food swamps are more of a concern than food deserts with regard to developing obesity prevention interventions, relating a higher access to obesity-creating foods to weight gain as opposed to simply a lack of other nutrients as a food desert term would imply. Additionally, there have been studies in Sub-Saharan Africa that indicate similar health outcomes in areas with excessive unhealthy foods that can be classified as food swamps. There has also been work done to typify urban food environments as food swamps in Melbourne, Australia based on their ranks in the accessibility of healthy foods.

== Current debates ==
=== Definitions and measurements ===
The term food swamp is relatively new as urban areas have progressed over time in modern society. Thus, governments and public health agencies are developing strategies to analyze and qualify areas by the term.

New measurement tools have been developed to further improve analysis so that food swamps can be more appropriately and accurately designated. Some researchers qualify food swamps using a tool called the Modified Retail Food Environmental Index, or mRFEI. Created by the Centers for Disease Control and Prevention, mRFEI measures whether or not quality of food options within census tracts at retail stores constitute a food swamp. The use of grocers as the metric for food swamps is very common, often being compared by their number in a county or zip code to the density of a population. Other methods include use of geographic information systems like ArcGIS to geocode addresses. This helps researchers to understand to food locations around people's homes.

Other measurement types include those considering broader factors such as geographic location and customer perceptions of their living and food environments. Government databases can be used to identify convenience food. A Brazilian methodology uses population to define food swamps by comparing the number of locations that provide processed foods to every 10,000 inhabitants.

Methods used to define food swamps are varying and can still be refined or more universally agreed upon. A 2020 study conducted in The Bronx and Upper East Side of New York City noted suggested that food swamp classification should be broadened to include more than only retail food stores or restaurants. It has also been recommended that future measurement could also include surveys of perceived dietary quality among various groups, which have been found to align with the outcomes of objective classification tools.

=== Controversy of term ===
The term “food swamp” has endured some criticism on account of its referral to wetlands with a negative connotation. Critics have raised the point that while swamps have positive influences on ecosystems such as by detoxifying water and supporting biodiversity, food swamps exclusively cause problems for human health and the environment.

== Proposed solutions ==
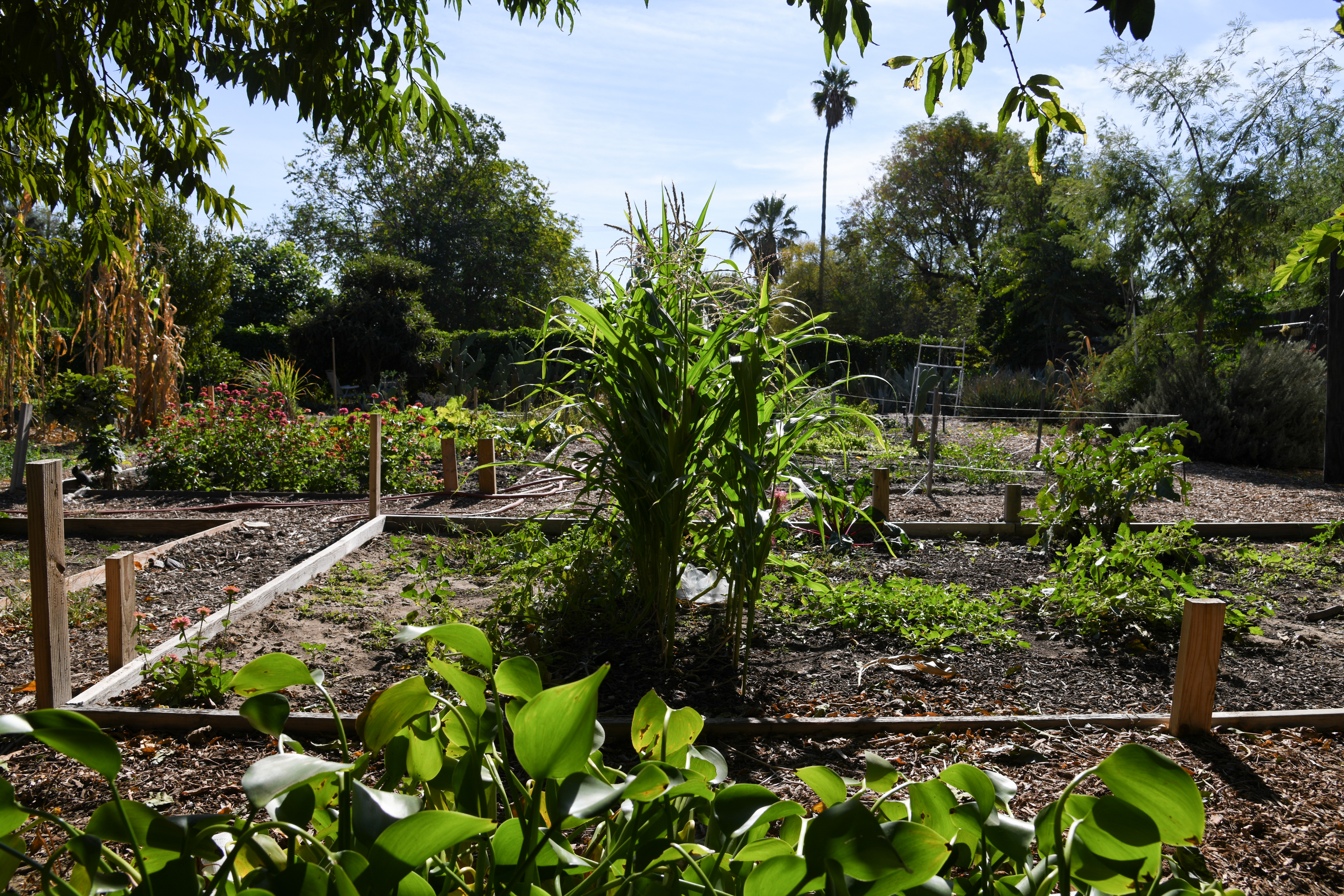
Community garden in a low-income urban community in Ontario, California

Many solutions have been proposed to address or eliminate food swamps. Researchers have proposed solutions such as introducing policies that address factors like the built environment, which consists of those man-made surroundings of a person's life. This also has included limiting the amount of fast-food establishments in an area, or incentivizing the distribution of healthy food options in an area.

Municipal responsibilities have been particularly noted as an avenue for change. Researchers have suggested that local governments should introduce policies such as new zoning laws that limit the number of possible unhealthy food outlets and incentivize the presence of healthy food retailers. Lowering obesity rates is not dependent on the elimination of fast-food options but rather a more equal rate of unhealthy to healthy food options. It has also been suggested that having more community gardens and walkable neighborhoods could address this phenomenon.

The Food Trust is an American nonprofit group that works to eliminate food swamps by ensuring access to food that is affordable and nutritious. They support programs which encourage Supplemental Nutrition Assistance Program, or SNAP, recipients to buy healthy food.

Other efforts have been attempted outside of the United States as well. Some communities have attempted to implement a strategy called "Drying out" which involves multiple levels of intervention, ranging from top-down policy changes to attempts to shift individual health behaviors and habits. Such policies would seek to decrease a community's exposure to high-calorie food options. For example, in the early 2010s, Mexico began imposing strategies in schools to address food access. This included taxing sugar-sweetened beverages and prohibiting sodas. Some researchers have called for policies such as these to be researched in order to better understand implementation and replicate similar results.

Smaller-scale advocacy efforts have also been suggested. In an effort to center the community, it has been suggested that researcher gather support and data from community members to gauge their own values surrounding food. Additionally, the need to examine food quality itself rather than its mere availability is also a matter of concern in food swamp intervention.

== See also ==
- Criticism of fast food
- Food choice
- Food desert
- Health equity
- Nutrition
- Obesity
