= Supermarket shortage =

Lack of supermarkets in some American neighborhoods

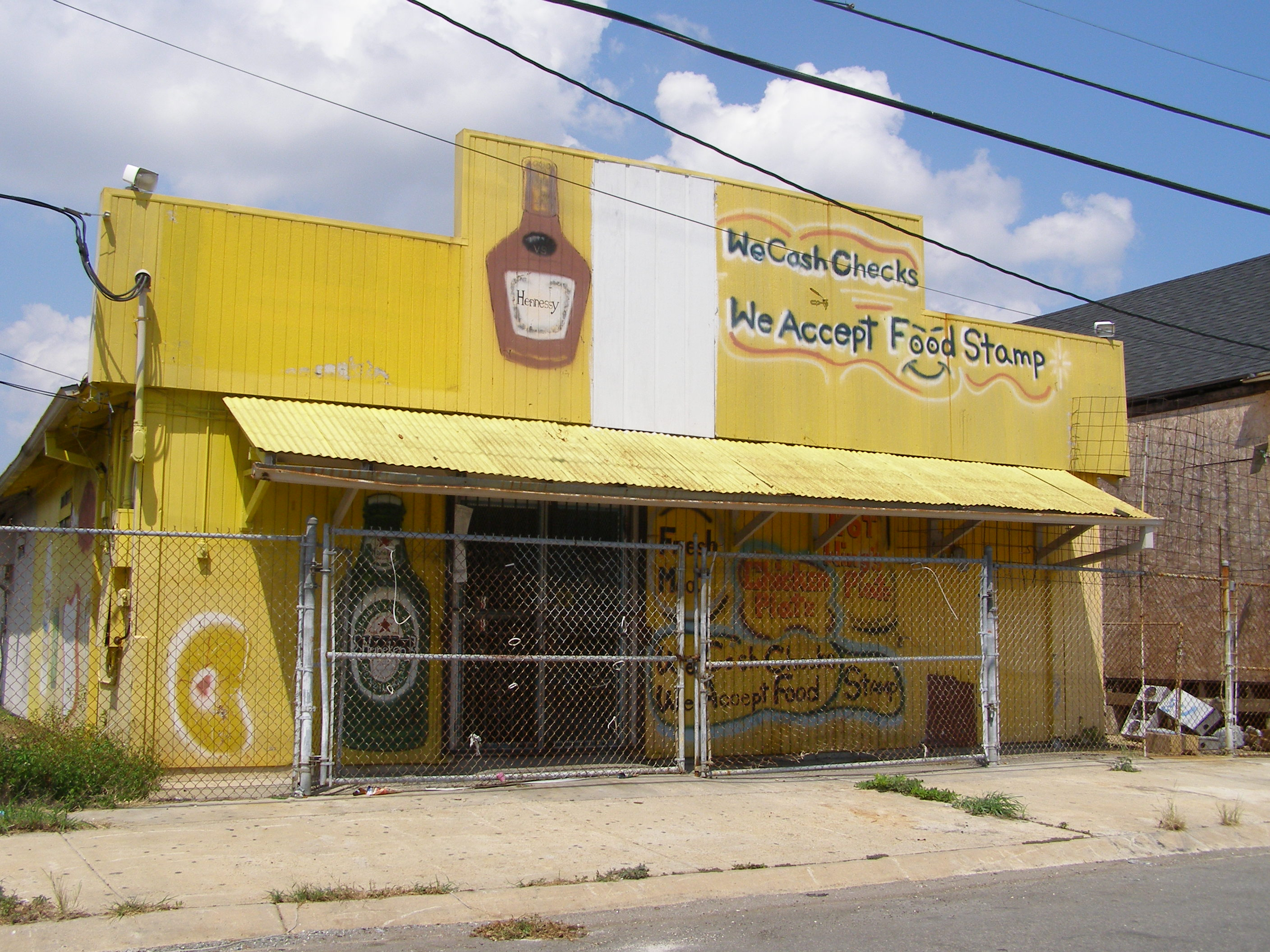
A closed grocery store in New Orleans, 2007

Supermarket shortages have been identified in many American urban neighborhoods, and such gaps in food access have been closely correlated with diet-related diseases such as cancer, obesity, and diabetes. The shortage began when many supermarkets left mixed-income central city neighborhoods after civil disturbances in the late 1960s and 1970s. By 1984, store openings exceeded closings nationally, but the opposite held in cities. In 2001, the trend continued. The reluctance of large chains to open in urban areas is termed by some activists, "supermarket redlining."

In 1995, 21 of America's largest cities had a grocery gap, with fewer stores and less square footage per store. In 1998, the poorest neighborhoods typically had about 55% of the grocery square footage of the best-off neighborhoods. The migration of supermarkets to the suburbs contributes to the creation of so-called food deserts in the United States. In 2002, there was a lower prevalence of independently owned grocery stores in low-wealth and predominantly Black neighborhoods and a greater proportion of households without access to private transportation in these neighborhoods.

Supermarkets generally provide food at cheaper prices than the bodegas and pharmacies that service inner-city areas. A 2022 study that compared supermarkets, neighborhood groceries, convenience stores, and health food stores in San Diego, California found that supermarkets had twice the average number of 'heart-healthy' foods compared to neighborhood grocery stores, and four times the average number of such foods compared to convenience stores.

== Causes ==
In 2006, US grocery stores typically had only 1% to 2% profit margins, so the difficulties involved in running an urban supermarket are often seen as too costly in an already-risky business. A combination of other factors make urban neighborhoods seem less than ideal for grocery store executives.

=== Market ===
In 2006, urban stores in low-income neighborhoods generally had less demand for the profitable luxury goods that are more popular in suburban stores. In 2003, people who shopped with food stamps usually bought fewer nonperishable items like toiletries and impulse items, the things that bring stores their highest profits.

A 2007 study suggested that urban stores must stock a variety of lower-volume items geared to multiethnic tastes. Compounding the problem, chain stores are generally unfamiliar with ethnic preferences. A 1998 study found that chains tend to develop a formula that works for their core market, which consists of middle-class, white suburbanites.

One obstacle to supermarket growth is that developers tend to overlook the market potential of urban communities. Underserved urban neighborhoods tend to be composed of populations with lower incomes on average, but the density of an urban environment also means that city neighborhoods tend to have more income per acre than suburban areas. A 1999 study by the Initiative for a Competitive Inner City in Boston, found that "nearly 8 million people who live in the nation's poorest urban communities have a combined $85 billion in retail spending power, which is far greater than all of Mexico."

=== Stereotypes ===
A 2001 study stated that prejudices have biased marketing research and prevented supermarkets from seeing the potential of urban locations. National marketing firms have provided grocery store executives with statistics derived from flawed modeling techniques. These statistics include erroneous information about population decline, the perpetuation of stereotypes about the people who live in urban communities, and miscalculated income information.

A 1998 study stated that the media portrays urban areas as poor and dependent, contributing to supermarket executives' skepticism. The study stated that urban areas usually consist overwhelmingly of working households with a substantial share of middle-income people.

=== Security ===
In 1998, shoplifting equated to 6% to 8% of supermarket revenues. Fear of crime also acts as a big deterrent for investors, but some cities interested in developing new grocery stores have placed police stations near development sites in order to allay developers' fears.

=== Land ===
A 2006 article stated that the expense and scarcity of land in urban environments poses some of the greatest problems for supermarket developers. A 1998 study stated that finding sites for urban development involves fees, complexity, length, and unpredictability.

Today's suburban supermarket model requires more space than older, urban facilities can accommodate, meaning that urban supermarket development often requires the construction of new facilities. While suburban supermarkets are typically 45,000 square feet (4,200 m^{2}), urban supermarkets are only 25,000 square feet (2,300 m^{2}) on average. This means that urban supermarkets can sell significantly fewer products than suburban stores, which contributes to lower profits.

== Community issues ==
A grocery store's 24-hour lighting "does a lot for the sense of safety and community in the neighborhood," because supermarkets can be a safe haven. Citizens feel a "dramatic change in atmosphere," after new supermarkets are built.

A 1998 study suggested that by engaging with local organizations, supermarkets can create a link with a community that will contribute to security, a reduction in shrinkage, and provide for better selection and effectiveness of employees. Organizations, such as churches, can help in hiring decisions, and security guards can come from the community. These make security more effective, bring jobs to communities, and make customers brand-loyal. The 1998 study suggested that grocery stores should confer with local religious officials about religious diets.

A 1998 study suggested that stores keep in mind the shopping habits of urban consumers, who often rely on monies distributed to them at the beginning of each month. Stores may want to "staff to accommodate strong demand in the first two weeks of the month, slack purchases in the last week, and heavier traffic that purchases less per customer in general," according to the shopping habits of urban consumers.

== Racial issues ==
In a 2003 study, of 216 US census tracts studied, the ratio of supermarkets to residents for predominantly White areas was 1:3816, versus 1:23,582 for predominantly Black areas. In 2002, 8% of Black Americans lived in a census tract with at least one supermarket. In 2002, 31% of Whites lived in a census tract with at least one supermarket. A 2006 study found that the proportion of Black people in a local population can affect an area's likelihood of having a supermarket.

== Case studies ==
Many cities and states across the US have recognized the urban supermarket gap problem, and have developed plans to address the issue of food access. In 2010, the U.S. federal government established the Healthy Food Financing Initiative. The initiative provided more than $400 million in funding from the Treasury Department, USDA and Department of Health and Human Services, to promote expanding access to nutritious foods, including developing and equipping grocery stores and other small retailers to sell healthful food in low-income rural and urban communities that currently lack this option.

=== Pennsylvania ===
In April 2003, Pennsylvania passed the nation's first statewide economic development initiative aimed at improving access to markets that sell healthy food in underserved rural and urban communities. The legislation devoted $100 million to agriculture projects, including the development of grocery stores and farmers' markets, and $40 million to support the development of 10 new stores in underserved communities across Pennsylvania.

In 2004, the resulting Fresh Food Financing Initiative was a public-private partnership in association with The Food Trust, started with state seed funds. The program encouraged the development of new supermarkets by providing grants of up to $250,000 or loans of up to $2.5 million per store, to defray the infrastructure costs of developing a new store.

Up to 2009, $41.8 million in grants and loans funded 58 stores. Success of the initiative led to the creation of similar programs in at least seven states and cities, like the New York City Food Retail Expansion to Support Health (FRESH) program.

=== New York City ===
Like many other cities in the US, New York City faces a supermarket shortage that is closely linked to health epidemics. At the request of the Mayor’s office, the Department of City Planning studied supermarket need in the city and, in April 2008, found a widespread shortage of supermarkets. This shortage causes a lack of healthy, fair-priced food options for many New Yorkers who live in a food desert. In 2012, food access issues were partly responsible for diabetes affecting over 700,000 people in New York City, over 1.1 million New Yorkers being obese, and another 2 million being overweight.

Health problems are especially prevalent in minority communities, and statistics indicate a racial dimension to the crisis: Supermarkets in Harlem are 30% less common than on the Upper East Side, and while 20% of Upper East Side bodegas carried leafy green vegetables, only 3% of those in Harlem did.

In 2012, three million New Yorkers lived in neighborhoods with a high need for grocery stores and supermarkets. Neighborhoods such as Central and Spanish Harlem and Washington Heights in Manhattan; Bushwick, Bedford Stuyvesant, East New York and Sunset Park in Brooklyn; Corona, Jamaica and Far Rockaway in Queens; areas of the South Bronx, Williamsbridge/Wakefield and portions of Pelham Parkway in the Bronx; and St. George and Stapleton in Staten Island show the greatest need for full-line supermarkets.

In February, 2008, Speaker Christine Quinn of the City Council announced the creation of a Statewide Supermarket Commission to identify state and local policy solutions to encourage new supermarket development and prevent supermarkets from closing. The Commission was led by the Food Trust and the Food Bank for New York City, in partnership with the City’s Food Policy Coordinator and the Food Industry Alliance. Simultaneously, the United Food and Commercial Workers Local 1500, which represents grocery store workers, is working to create healthy food options for all New Yorkers through supermarkets, Community-supported agriculture, urban agriculture, and farmers' markets.

The FRESH program attempts to increase access to full-service grocery stores in designated "underserved" areas with help in zoning incentives, abatements of land and building taxes for 25 years and other tax subsidies such as sales tax exemptions on building materials.

=== California ===
In Oakland's flatlands, the development of low-income communities, lowered real estate values, zoning restrictions, land parcel sizes and property taxes discouraged supermarkets and other full-service food retailers. Corner stores, convenience stores and liquor stores took root where commercial parcels were too small to accommodate a grocery store. Overall, supermarket penetration largely drove down the number of grocery stores in West Oakland from 137 in 1960 to 22 in 1980. By the 1990s, many supermarkets in the flatlands also closed their doors to invest in more profitable areas.

By 2005, The California Endowment and its then-$26 million initiative California FreshWorks set out to increase availability of healthy food options by investing in grocery stores in low-income and minority communities. As of 2014, about $264 million had been raised from a variety of investors.

=== Illinois ===
In 2014, the Illinois Fresh Food fund began with a $10 million state grant, set up to finance full-service grocery stores in neighborhoods with little access to fresh foods.

Chicago's Retail Chicago Program is an outreach program for retailers, brokers, and developers to introduce them to the many community retail development opportunities in Chicago and expedite their entry into these new markets by serving as a "One Stop Shop" to assist them during their site selection process.

=== Other states ===
In 2014, similar programs created after Pennsylvania's initiative include the New Jersey Food Access Initiative. Colorado has the Fresh Food Financing Fund at the city level. New Orleans has a Fresh Food Retailer Initiative. Cincinnati has a Fresh Food Financing Fund.

== Economic effects ==
A 2005 study found that besides causing a lack of access to healthy foods, the urban supermarket gap also means that inner city neighborhoods lack the jobs and tax revenues that grocery stores provide.

== Strategies ==
Where supermarket developers have neglected some urban neighborhoods, city governments and non-profits can work together to market the potential of inner city areas to grocery store executives. In 2005, Chicago’s planning department provided an information guide with a database of suitable land parcels to executives at a grocers’ expo.

In 2006, many of Oakland’s existing food retail businesses were located within Redevelopment Areas, allowing them to qualify for redevelopment fund assistance. The 2006 Food Systems Assessment Report for Oakland suggested the creation of Food Retail Enterprise Zones, whereby food retailers that provide nutritious foods in poor neighborhoods are exempt from Oakland business taxes. It also suggested programs, like the Green Business certification program could award “Green and Healthy Oakland” certification to retail establishments that stock food or offer menu items conforming to specific criteria (fresh, nutritious, local, etc.)

Market leaders close urban stores, even if they are showing a profit, to focus on the most productive stores in the suburbs. But "operators in second and third place in a metro area may seek to expand their core clientele outside the highly contested, white suburbs to other areas and groups, such as the mixed-income neighborhoods and ethnic clients in the central city." Baltimore initially attracted "low-level" chains and "now, upscale, full-service stores wants to locate in areas they had previous ignored."

A 1998 study stated that executives’ fears of security costs may be easily abated: Rochester clinched the deal with a Tops supermarket, by offering to locate a police station at the development site. Hiring locals as security guards helps decrease security issues and losses to shrinkage.

== Criticism ==
Despite the widespread efforts to address supermarket shortages and food deserts, not all researchers are convinced that such areas are common. At least one 2002 United Kingdom medical review and a 2009 US government report have suggested that food deserts are relatively rare. Nevertheless, their purported existence continues to drive significant public health expenditures.

== See also ==
- Food deserts in the United States
