= Food desert =

Area with low access to nutritious food

The Atlanta skyline in 2026. Atlanta, Georgia is notable for its food deserts. A 2023 report from Emory University found that black and low income neighborhoods were less likely to have access to fresh produce.

A food desert is an area that has limited access to affordable, fresh, healthy, and nutritious food. Food deserts are commonly paired with food swamps, which lack grocery stores and instead have convenience stores or fast food. In contrast, an area with greater access to grocers or farmers' markets with fresh foods may be called a food oasis. Food deserts are commonly associated with food insecurity and are linked to worsening health outcome including an increased risk of developing chronic diseases such as obesity, diabetes, and cardiovascular disease.

In 2025, the United States Department of Agriculture reported that an estimated 12.8% of the US population were living in low-income and low-access census tracts. Of this number, 22 million people live in "food deserts", which they define as low-income census tracts that are more than 1 mile (1.6 kilometers) from a supermarket in urban or suburban areas and more than 10 miles (16 kilometers) from a supermarket in rural areas. However, food deserts are not just a complication that arises because of distance to grocery stores; other structural barriers, such as food accessibility, affordability, transportation struggles, and socio-economic constraints, also play a role in food insecurity.

Food deserts tend to be inhabited by low-income residents with inadequate access to transportation, which makes them less attractive markets for large supermarket chains. These areas lack suppliers of fresh foods, such as meats, fruits, and vegetables. Instead, available foods are likely to be processed and high in sugar and fats, which are known contributors to obesity in the United States. Children that grow up in food deserts are at a greater risk of developing obesity due to the reliance on calorie-dense but nutrient-poor foods. Research has found a great link between childhood obesity rates and the presence of food deserts, specifically in urban areas with limited options for supermarkets.

A related concept is the phenomenon of a food swamp, a recently coined term by researchers who defined it as an area with a disproportionate number of fast food restaurants (and fast food advertising) in comparison to the number of supermarkets in that area. A study of the North Hartford Promise Zone, found that from both an objective measure of how much a given area was a food swamp, as well a subjective self-reports from residents of low-income and ethnically diverse neighborhoods, a higher score on their "food swamp index" was positively associated with increased shopping frequency at unhealthy food places and simultaneously positively associated with perceived access to unhealthy food. Additionally, higher food swamp scores were associated with increased public transit use. Food swamps highlight how historical discriminatory zoning practices and systematic disinvestment in communities of color have manifested in present day conversations surrounding food access, which are exacerbated by the lack of adequate transportation for people reliant on public transit. The single supermarket in a low-income area does not, according to researchers Rose and colleagues, necessitate availability nor does it decrease obesity rates and health risks. Recent studies have found that food swamps may fundamentally contribute to obesity-related health conditions more than food deserts alone, as the high concentration of unhealthy food options impacts dietary behaviors and long-term health risks, including higher mortality from obesity-related cancers.

Research has shown that food deserts disproportionately affect vulnerable populations, including low income communities, and people with chronic diseases like diabetes, who may struggle with food insecurity and poor glycemic control due to the little access to fresh, health food choices.

== History ==
By 1967, the term "desert" was ascribed to suburban areas lacking amenities important for community development. A report by Cummins and Macintyre states that a resident of public housing in western Scotland supposedly coined the more specific phrase "food desert" in the early 1990s. The phrase was first officially used in a 1995 document from a policy working group on the Low Income Project Team of the UK's Nutrition Task Force.

Food deserts in America and the UK have been most widely studied due to the Western origins of the concept. Initial research was narrowed to the impact of retail migration from the urban center. More recent studies explored the impact of food deserts in other geographic areas (such as rural and frontier) and among specific populations like minorities and the elderly. The studies addressed the relationships between the quality (access and availability) of retail food environments, the price of food, and obesity. Environmental factors can also contribute to people's eating behaviors. Research conducted with variations in methods draws a more complete perspective of "multilevel influences of the retail food environment on eating behaviors (and risk of obesity)."

As a result, there has been a paradigm shift within the movement with community organizers encouraging members of affected neighborhoods to consider how inadequate food systems correlate with the intersectionality of race and class. The Planting Seeds Just Tour serves as an example, as it visited solution based projects to resist injustices with ecological wisdom and food justice that were run by women of color. The tour also highlighted economically viable alternatives to provide healthy food and created spaces in which community members could participate in conversations regarding sustainability.

Advocates within the Food Justice movement have identified that terms like "Food Desert" undermine how the intersections of race and class largely influences minority communities' inaccessibility to fresh foods. To better describe what is taking place, activists such as Karen Washington have begun to use the term "food apartheid." The activist and community organizer Karen Washington describes the term as "[looking] at the whole food system, along with race, geography, faith, and economics."

== Definitions ==
Researchers employ a variety of methods to assess food deserts including directories and census data, focus groups, food store assessments, food use inventories, geographic information system (GIS), interviews, questionnaires and surveys measuring consumers' food access perceptions. Differences in the definition of a food desert vary according to the following:

- The type of area, urban or rural.
- Economic barriers and affordability of accessing nutritious foods, including the cost of transportation, price of foods, and incomes of those in the area.
- The distance to the nearest supermarket or grocery store.
- number of supermarkets in the given area.
- type of foods offered, whether it be fresh or prepared.
- nutritional values of the foods offered.

The multitude of definitions, varying by country, has fueled controversy over the existence of food deserts.

It should also be noted that because it is too costly to survey the types of foods and prices offered in every store, researchers use the availability of supermarkets and large grocery stores, including discount and supercenter stores, as a proxy for the availability of affordable nutritious food.

== Types ==
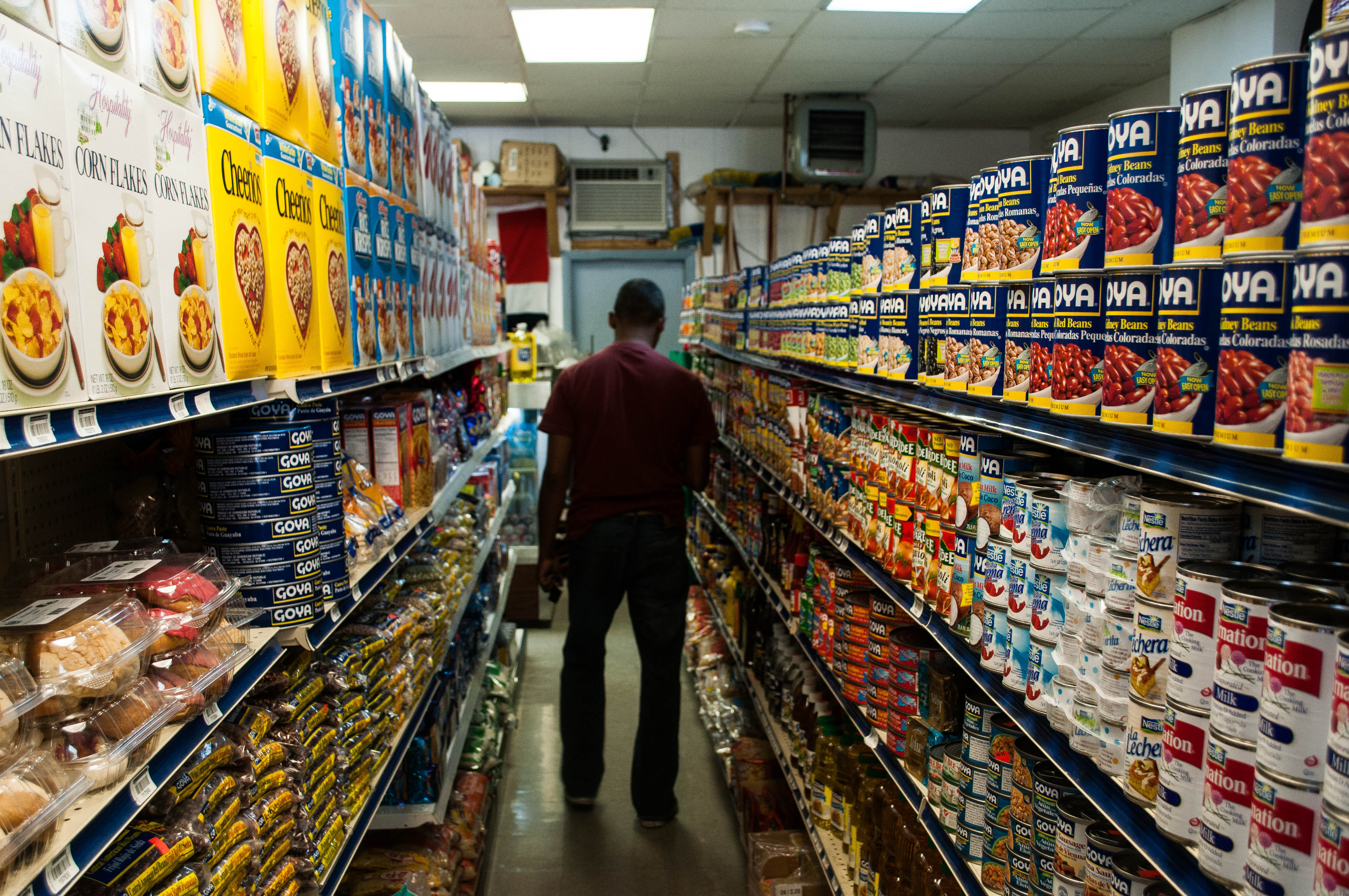
A convenience store in Boston. Most of the food visible is relatively imperishable: dried, processed, and tinned products.

The term "urban food deserts" is traditionally applied to North America and Europe, but in recent years, the term has been extended to Africa as well. It has taken time for researchers to understand Africa's urban food deserts because the conventional understanding of the term must be reevaluated to fit Africa's unconventional supermarkets.

A 2009 study stated that people tend to make food choices based on what is available in their neighborhood. Food deserts often have a high density of fast-food restaurants and corner stores that offer prepared and processed foods. A 2018 Tulane University study stated that there are three categories for food deserts: ability-related, assets-related, and attitude-related. Ability-related food deserts are "anything that physically prevents access to food which a consumer otherwise has the financial resources to purchase and the mental desire to buy." An asset-related food desert involves the absence of financial assets, which prevents consumption of desirable food that is otherwise available. Attitude-related food deserts are any state of mind that prevents consumers from accessing the foods they can otherwise physically bring into their home and have the necessary assets to procure.

== Causes ==
Food deserts have primarily been studied in Western countries due to limitations around applying the retail access definition to different communities with varying cultures, food sourcing strategies, and environments around the world.

A 2009 USDA study observed that low access to supermarkets in the U.S. is affected by various characteristics of neighborhoods and the geography of a community. The study cited income gaps, segregation by race, socioeconomic status, transport availability and infrastructure, rurality, segregation by income, and percentages of vacant homes in a community as variable factors that determined the degree of communities' access to supermarkets.

=== Demographic changes and redlining ===
In the United States redlining is seen as a discriminatory pattern that disproportionately impacts low-income African Americans and people of color. Redlining began in the 1930s when the Home Owner Loan Corporation (HOLC) developed a grading system that showed the security levels of neighborhoods through maps, causing racial segregation in neighborhoods, which has continued to impact communities of color. This pattern of racial segregation is associated with present day food deserts where BIPOC often experience a limited access of affordable and nutritious food. Historical redlining is associated with present day food deserts, as formerly redlined neighborhoods lack access to affordable and nutritious food.

Supermarket redlining has been proposed as a cause of lower access to supermarkets that is characteristic of some scholarly definitions of food deserts. The concept describes how large chain supermarkets tend to relocate out of or refrain from opening stores in inner-city areas or impoverished neighborhoods due to perceived urban and economic obstacles, decreasing certain communities' access to supermarkets. With the gentrification of lower-income and lower-resourced areas, one study found that the gentrification of urban areas was still associated with a lack of food access. As such, the lower-resourced residents of these areas struggle to have consistent healthy food access, as grocery stores do not open in these gentrified areas at the same rate they are being gentrified, adding an additional problem to the community while simultaneously not addressing the food insecurity that already exists in lower-resourced urban areas. Businesses' perceived urban obstacles include decreased demand compared to suburban neighborhoods, higher land, wage, and utility costs, and increased crime in urban areas. Economic factors such as supply and demand that businesses take into consideration are affected by a complex web of interconnected factors (e.g. demand for fresh produce is affected by people's socioeconomic status and cultural upbringing).

As several studies have shown the discrepancies in the number of supermarkets in predominately black neighborhoods compared to predominately White neighborhoods, the characteristics of a neighborhood population are suggested to be motivations behind some business' reluctance to open in certain neighborhoods. The decreased availability of supermarkets in certain communities increases the distance people have to travel to get food, further limiting food access for people without access to reliable transportation.

=== United States federal initiatives ===
To address the problems of food deserts, the Healthy Food Financing Initiative (HFFI) was established in the United States in 2010 and offers grants and loans to food hubs, small enterprises, and grocery shops in underprivileged areas. In order to provide access to healthier food options, the HFFI has granted more than $220 million in funding as of 2023 and leveraged about $1 billion in private investment.

There are resources such as the Supplemental Nutrition Assistance Program (SNAP), National School Lunch Program, and the Woman Infants & Children (WIC), funded by the U.S Department of Agriculture through the Food Nutrition and Services (FNS). As of April 2026 there's 16 federally funded nutrition assistant programs that serve eligible individuals including low-income populations and those experiencing food insecurity. These programs aim at reducing food insecurity which is associated with communities living in food deserts.

=== Transportation and geography ===
Within the United States, scholars have proposed several different causes behind the formation of food deserts. One theory behind the emergence of food deserts, defined as areas with low supermarket access, is the expansion of large chain supermarkets that displaced smaller food stores from neighborhoods. Scholars cite the greater appeal of large chain supermarkets to consumers because of the wider variety and better values of food they offer as well as longer business hours compared to smaller, independently or family-owned grocery stores, leading to decreased demand and support for smaller food stores. The expansion of large chain supermarkets and loss of smaller food stores can create certain areas where only people with transportation can access, creating areas of disproportionate retail access that some scholars characterize as a food desert. A 2025 study from the University of California, Los Angeles found that the growth of dollar store chains caused grocery stores to exit low income markets, creating food deserts.

According to the United States Department of Agriculture (USDA), community food security "concerns the underlying social, economic, and institutional factors within a community that affect the quantity and quality of available food and its affordability or price relative to the sufficiency of financial resources available to acquire it." Rural areas tend have higher food insecurity than urban areas because food choices in rural areas are often restricted, with transportation being needed to access a major supermarket or a food supply that offers a wide, healthy variety of foods. Smaller convenience stores typically do not offer as much produce.

It is critical to look at car ownership in relation to the distance and number of stores in the area. A 2009 study stated that the distance from shops influences the quality of food eaten. A vehicle or access to public transportation is often needed to go to a grocery store. When neither a car nor public transportation is available, diets are rarely healthy because fast food and convenience stores are easier to access and do not cost as much money or time. One study found that within neighborhoods of the North Hartford Promise Zone, residents who took the bus as their primary mode of transportation had the highest rates of unhealthy food purchasing. Those who walk to food shops typically have poorer diets, which has been attributed to having to carry shopping bags home.

The primary criterion for a food desert is its proximity to a healthy food market. When such a market is in reach for its residents, a food desert ceases to exist, but that does not mean that residents will now choose to eat healthily. A longitudinal study of food deserts in JAMA Internal Medicine shows that supermarket availability is generally unrelated to fruit and vegetable recommendations and overall diet quality.

In a 2018 article in Guernica, Karen Washington states that factors beyond physical access suggest the community should reexamine the word food desert itself. She believes "food apartheid" more accurately captures the circumstances surrounding access to affordable nutritious foods: "When we say food apartheid the real conversation can begin."

=== Consumer choices ===
Access to food options is not the only barrier to healthier diets and improved health outcomes. Wrigley et al. collected data before and after a food desert intervention to explore factors affecting supermarket choice and perceptions regarding healthy diet in Leeds, United Kingdom. Pretests were administered prior to a new store opening and post-tests were delivered two years after the new store had opened. The results showed that nearly half of the food desert residents began shopping at the newly built store, but only modest improvements in diet were recorded.

A similar pilot study conducted by Cummins et al. focused on a community that was funded by the Pennsylvania Fresh Food Financing Initiative. It followed up after a grocery store was built in a food desert to assess the store's impact. The study found that "simply building new food retail stores may not be sufficient to promote behavior change related to diet." Studies like those show that living close to a store that is stocked with fruits and vegetables does not make a large impact on food choices.

A separate survey also found that supermarket and grocery store availability did not generally correlate with diet quality and fresh food intake. Pearson et al. further confirmed that physical access is not the sole determinant of fruit and vegetable consumption.

As food deserts are most commonly found in high poverty areas, a study of the struggles of being low-income in low-resourced communities found that many people understand the importance of maintaining a balanced diet through the consumption of fruits, vegetables, and fewer processed foods, with some participants even expressing a desire to eat fresh and healthy foods. However, being of a lower socioeconomic status further exacerbates the unhealthy diets observed of many people who live and/or work in food deserts. Despite the desire to eat fresh and healthy meals, it is oftentimes unattainable for low-income families, forcing them to turn to packaged and process foods that have longer shelf lives.

=== Restrictive covenants ===
Supermarket chains in the U.S. sometimes write restrictive covenants into a grocery building’s deed or lease. These are legal clauses in a contract which may restrict how the location may be used, even for many years after the contract has ended. Generally they forbid food stores to be put in place in a given spot. The reason behind such agreements is that the company may want to have the opportunity to relocate to another place and bring their customers with them, rather than letting their customers shop with another grocer who might take over the same location.

=== Climate change and weather ===
Africa suffers from food deserts, and there is also a direct link between climate change and the rapid growth of food deserts. While supermarkets are expanding to areas in which they once did not exist, there is still a disparity when it comes to physical access. In Cape Town, asset-related urban food deserts are the main reason for food insecurity since its people cannot afford the food that they would prefer to eat.

Climate change can play role in urban food deserts because it directly affects accessibility. The main way that climate change affects food security and food deserts is by reducing the production of food. With the limited availability of a product, the price rises making it unavailable to those that cannot afford more expensive commodities. In Cape Town specifically, supermarkets rely directly on fresh produce from the nearby farm area. Climate change affects the production of food, and it can also damage capital assets that affect accessibility and utilization.

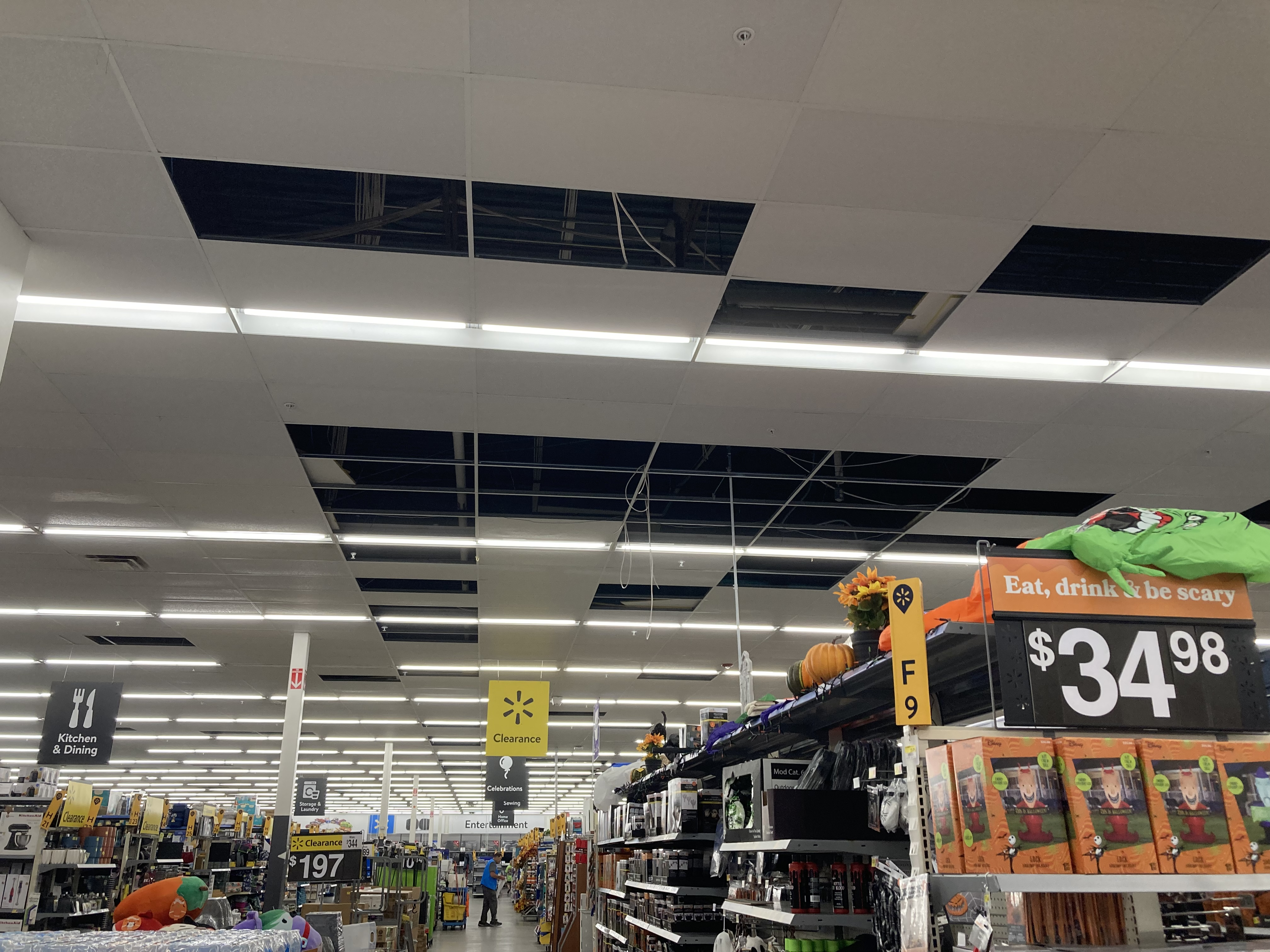
Hurricane Ian caused some damage to the ceiling of a Walmart store.

Food access can be restricted in an area that is hit by natural disasters. Access to stores in low-income neighborhoods can be blocked when roads are flooded. Building damage can delay store openings. After Hurricane Harvey, grocery stores were not able to resume normal operation as they faced issues of infrastructure damage and supply issues. This situation was particularly dire for low-income communities, as they often have fewer resources to cope with such disasters and are more likely to live in areas prone to flooding and lacking in food retail options.

This resulted in supermarkets in low-income neighborhoods being closed longer than other stores, which only worsened pre-existing inequalities. There were less supermarkets available after Hurricane Katrina hit New Orleans. Access to supermarkets in predominately Black neighborhoods was already limited prior to the storm. The Storm increased racial-disparities in food access and access to supermarkets.

=== Work and family ===
People who have nonstandard work hours, including rotating or evening shifts, may have difficulty shopping at stores that close earlier and so opt instead to shop at fast food or convenience stores, which are generally open later. The lack of accessible healthy foods increases the difficulty for these shift workers to maintain a balanced diet. Healthcare workers who work the night shift, especially in food deserts, report skipping meals until they leave work, because oftentimes, the only available options are pre-packaged foods or fast foods, despite their own desire to eat nutritious foods. One study found that shift workers who worked longer shifts self-reported higher levels of ultra-processed food consumption, as well as reporting higher levels of depression, anxiety, and stress. Disruptions to circadian rhythms due to irregular work schedules can lead to erratic eating patterns, in turn causing shift workers to become more susceptible to hedonic eating, the authors suggest. Living and/or working in a food desert amplifies one's desire to turn to ultra-processed foods and pre-packaged foods as both a means of convenience but also as a coping mechanism to deal with the occupational demands and psychological stressors shift workers face. If they live in a food desert and have family responsibilities, working may also limit time to travel to obtain nutritious foods as well as prepare healthful meals and exercise.

=== Crime and safety ===
Crime can serve as both a cause and effect of the development of food deserts in urban areas. Theft in stores can lead to increased prices for food, which can lead to more theft in a vicious cycle.

While violent and property crime are not always statistically linked to food deserts, studies have found that in neighborhoods with higher Black populations, the connection becomes stronger. Possible explanations may include historical withdrawal, White flight, and limited mobility options for the Black community.

Additional factors may include how different stores welcome different groups of people and nearness to liquor stores. Residents in a 2010 Chicago survey complained that in-store issues like poor upkeep and customer service were also impediments. Safety can also be an issue for those in high-crime areas, especially if they must walk while carrying food and maybe also with a child or children.

Media reports following the 2020 Black Lives Matter protests and related criminal justice reforms in the United States have often cited shoplifting and violence when reporting on the closure of urban grocery stores, while omitting more significant factors such as market demand, lower sales volumes, and industry consolidation. Financial reports to investors seldom mention theft as a cause of store closures. Despite corporations such as Target, CVS, and Walgreens publicly suggesting that shoplifting was the major reason for store closures, retail theft decreased in 17 of 24 major U.S. cities that consistently reported data from 2018 to 2023. The National Retail Federation (NRF) claimed in a 2023 report that "organized retail crime" accounted for nearly half of all reported inventory losses in 2021; the estimate was later retracted due to faulty data.

=== Behavioral, social, and cultural barriers ===
In 2017, the likelihood of being food insecure in the US was for 22.4% Latinos, 26.1% for African Americans, and 10.5% for Whites. A 2002 study found that people who are food insecure often find themselves having to cut back more at the end of the month, when their finances or food stamps run out. Month to month, there are other special occasions that may lead to higher spending on food such as birthdays, holidays, and unplanned events. Because people who are food insecure are still fundamentally involved in society, they are faced with the other stressors of life as well as the additional frustration or guilt that comes with not being able to feed themselves or their family.

In 2017, Steven Cummins proposed that food availability is not the problem, but eating habits are. In 2005, Pearson et al. urged food policy to focus on the social and cultural barriers to healthy eating. For instance, New York City's public-private Healthy Bodegas Initiative has aimed to encourage bodegas to carry milk and fresh produce and residents to purchase and consume them.

=== Pharmacies ===
In addition to the close proximity of fast-food restaurants and convenience stores, many low-income communities contain a higher prevalence of pharmacies, compared to medium- or high-income communities. Such stores often contain a high number of snack foods, such as candy, sugary beverages, and salty snacks, which is within arm's reach of a cash register in 96% of pharmacies. While pharmacies are important in these communities, they act as yet another convenience store and so further expose low-income residents to non-nutritional food.

== Nutrition ==
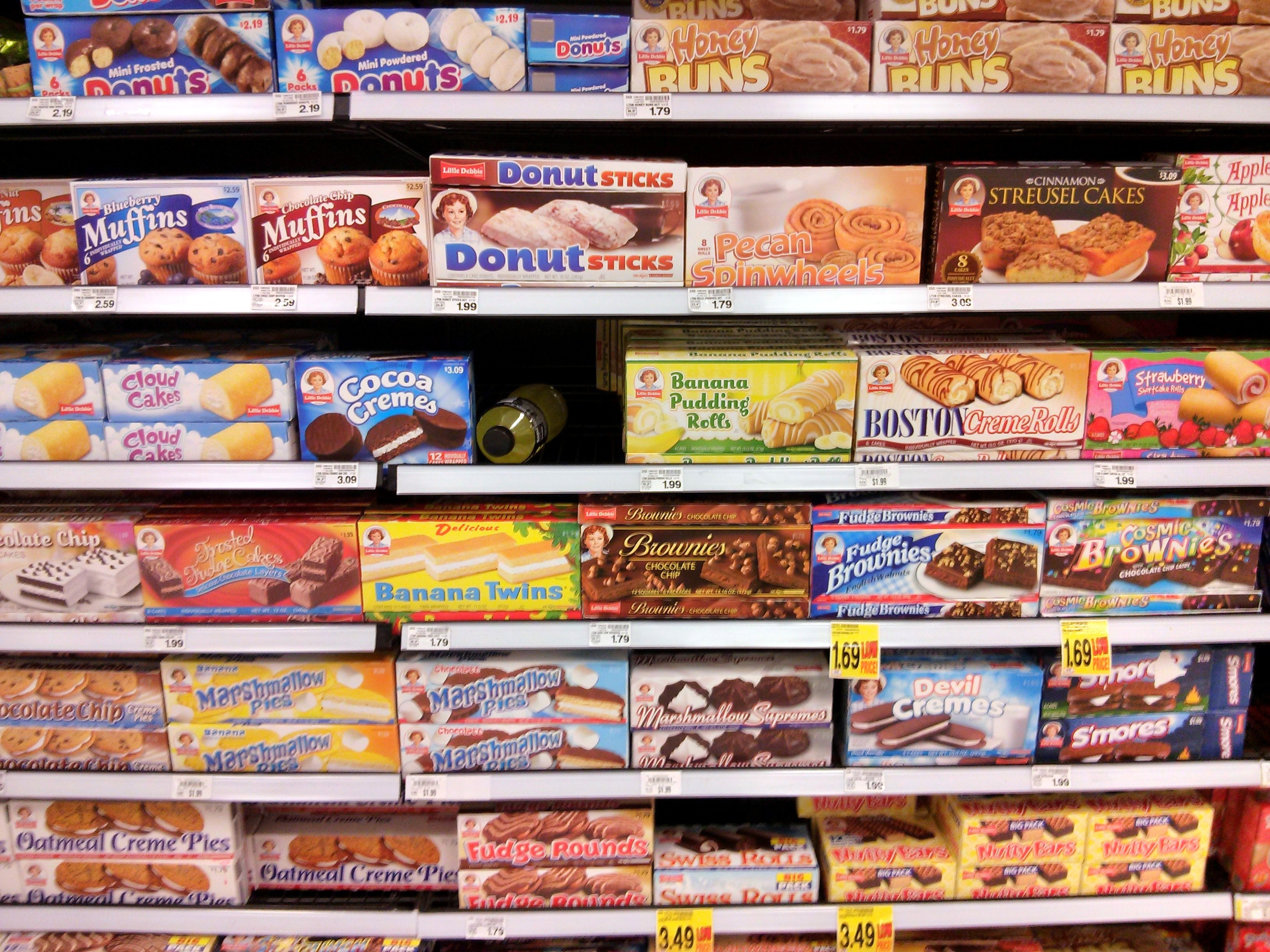
Processed foods at a grocery store in Houston, Texas

A key element of a food desert is its lack of healthy and nutritious foods. As food deserts are typically defined by household's decreased access to supermarkets and healthy food acquisition sources, areas defined as food deserts tend to have a greater number of fast food restaurants and convenient stores that are often more accessible and affordable for households.

Convenient/corner stores and fast food restaurants frequently carry more processed foods than fresh, unprocessed foods. The widespread availability of processed foods in food deserts poses increased health risks to residents: a high dietary intake of ultra-processed foods, which contains higher contents of sodium, salts, sugars, and additives than fresh foods, has been consistently linked to higher risks of negative health and metabolic outcomes.

A 2025 study found that the closure of grocery stores caused by the expansion of dollar stores caused nearby consumers to purchase fewer healthy products. A 2010 study stated that limited access to nutritious foods in food deserts can greatly impact one's ability to engage in healthy practices. Food access, affordability of the food, and health literacy are all social determinants of health that are accentuated by living in a food desert.

In order to accommodate the racialized aspect of food insecurity that exists as a result of historical redlining, and other racialized practices, some say the term "food apartheid" should be used over food insecurity, because the term "apartheid" acknowledges that race is a driving factor in the creation and persistence of these deserts. Food apartheids include limited access to food in general, but limited access to "nutrient-rich" as well, which in turn leads to "poor health outcomes," including "heart disease, diabetes, depression, and anxiety," and can be classified as "structuralized racism". Within predominantly black and brown neighborhoods and school districts, there was higher clustering of fast food restaurants, with "1.25 to 2 times as many restaurants than expected by chance". This was associated with a strong correlation between fast food proximity and youth body mass index (BMI), meaning black public school students are at a stronger "risk of obesity". Consequently, black youth are predisposed to a poor diet, and are more likely to continually make unhealthy dietary choices as a result of the subpar quality of grocery stores available, and high prevalence of fast food locations. However, black communities have done their best to mitigate this through community dietary efforts — for example, poorer black neighborhoods tend to have "more community gardens and urban farms" as a way to make fresh produce more readily available to residents. This reiterates the long-standing tradition of self-reliance in black communities, which allows residents to creatively "make ways out of no way" to feed and provide for themselves, even though these mechanisms of self-preservation are overlooked and unnoticed by people outside the community. Backyard gardens and other forms of unmarketable green spaces used to supplement the often unhealthy and overpriced foods offered in local bodegas and corner stores are not "explicitly [political]", but a way for those in nutritionally underserved communities to meet an otherwise unmet need. These green spaces work to promote health, but also allow residents to grow closer to each other, and realize that there are actionable methods for them to take control over some aspects of their health.

Multiple studies in the 2010s suggest that differences in demand for healthy food also contribute to poor health in food deserts.

== Effects ==
=== Community health ===
The concept of deprivation amplification has been proposed as an explanation of how food deserts can perpetuate poor health outcomes for a community: scholars suggest that residents of low-income neighborhoods' exposure to inadequate and unhealthy food environments can increase their individual risk factors for disease and poor health. However, a 2019 study published in The Quarterly Journal of Economics cast doubt on the notion that exposing poor neighborhoods to healthy groceries reduces nutritional inequality. The study found "that exposing low-income households to the same products and prices available to high-income households reduces nutritional inequality by only about 10 percent, while the remaining 90 percent is driven by differences in demand".

Past literature has suggested that lower retail access to supermarkets is linked to select cardiovascular health outcomes, and some studies have shown that increased access to supermarkets lowers the risk of obesity with opposite outcomes for convenience stores. However, many scholars have highlighted the limitations of these studies due to their localization, short time frame, focus on a singular health outcome (people's health are assessed through multiple measures of health, not just one factor), and inability to account for all the social determinants of health outcomes.

Scholars have asserted that while these studies can give insight into how food accessibility can contribute to health outcomes, because of the intersecting social determinants of health that contribute to individual health outcomes, the results cannot be interpreted as a casual relationship between food deserts and poor health outcomes.

Food deserts are just one aspect of people's individual food environments: food environments consist of the intersecting spheres of community food options (supermarkets, small stores, etc.); work/school/home food options (school food, home purchases); and individual food intake, all of which determine a health outcome. Likewise, individual characteristics such as demographics, socioeconomic status, the physical environment (retail access, transportation, etc.), and households' social environments (cultural/social norms, etc.) all impact diet, which is a determinant of health outcomes and a factor in certain diseases.

People's food environment is one of many social determinants of health that contribute to his/her health outcomes: social determinants of health such as transportation infrastructure, urban planning, the built environment, and local policies also contribute to a person's health outcome. Due to the complex intersecting factors of social determinants of health, studies have suggested that a community and individual's socioeconomic status (resource and economic deprivation) are more associated with negative health outcomes, rather than a lack of food access that is characteristic of food deserts.

A 2012 study found that grocery stores are more closely spaced in poor neighborhoods, and that there was no relation between children's food consumption, their weight, and the type of food available near their homes.

A study 2013 suggested that adding a grocery store near one's home was associated with an average BMI decrease of 0.115, which is very small compared to the excess BMI of an obese person.

== Strategies to address food deserts ==
While infrastructure upgrades, such the construction of new supermarkets and community food hubs, can boost perceived access to food, studies conducted in a number of countries have demonstrated that they do not always result in major dietary changes or a decrease in obesity rates. For instance, studies conducted in the US and the UK revealed that although locals were more satisfied after new supermarkets opened, overall fruit and vegetable consumption stayed relatively constant in the absence of further education and neighborhood-based programs. Outside of the US, initiatives in Canada and sub-Saharan Africa have integrated local agricultural assistance with mobile food distribution, highlighting the necessity of regionally customized, culturally appropriate solutions. These tactics are part of a larger movement in food policy that addresses systemic obstacles to healthy eating by combining physical infrastructure with public health and urban planning programs.

== Alternative frameworks to food deserts ==
Several studies in the 2010s have pointed out potential limitations of applying the concept of food deserts to addressing issues of food disparity and unhealthy food consumption, particularly in non-Western countries.

As food deserts is a concept that originated in the U.K. and is primarily studied in Anglo-Saxon countries, several scholars have questioned the applicability of food deserts to countries in the Global South. Scholars point out that food deserts are typically defined as a lack of access to supermarkets (spatial focus) and that its framework operates with the assumption that increased supermarkets means increased availability of healthy foods.

Some urban researchers argue that this current framework for identifying food deserts fails to consider additional spatial and non-spatial factors that contribute to household's food access and incorrectly assumes an increase in the number of retail food options will directly mitigate issues of food access and food insecurity within all local food systems. While the traditional framework assumes homogeneity between people's experiences in their local food system, scholars cite additional factors such as travel time, crime, food acquisition outside an person's home neighborhood, employment, income, and other household-specific behaviors that influence people's access to food.

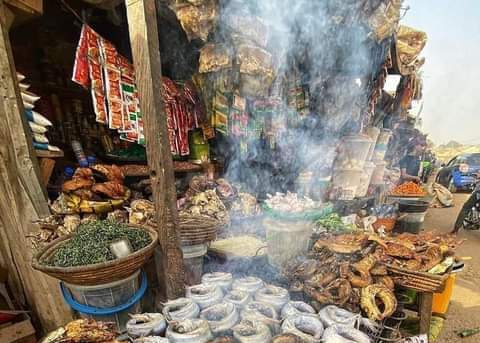
A market shop in Anambra State, Nigeria

Several studies have highlighted alternative food sources that deem supermarket access less relevant in transitioning countries such as many in Africa and rainforest cities in Brazil. For example, studies in 2012 and 2014 highlight that alternative food acquisition sources such as food vendors, small shops, open-air markets, urban agriculture, and food transfer between households are more frequently visited than retail food options in Africa's various cities.

Likewise, a 2017 study conducted in Brazil highlights the critical role of non-retail sources such as fishing, farming, and home gardens in people's food security and access. Due to the overlapping, context-specific factors unique to different local food economies that influence household food access and food security, some scholars emphasize the need to adjust the definition and framework of food deserts to specific contexts in order to effectively and holistically address food insecurity, nutrition disparities, and food access issues in developing countries.

Several researchers have also proposed shortcomings in the current definition and framework of food deserts in the U.S. when working to lessen unhealthy food consumption, diet disparities between different communities, and food insecurity. Some researchers criticize the primary focus of current food desert frameworks - lack of retail access - as a one-dimensional over-simplification of food security and access issues that fails to address structural issues to reduce unhealthy food consumption and diet disparities. Many food justice advocates also state that while local grassroots operations can provide some communities with increased food access, they fail to end food access inequities by addressing the core issues of poverty and historical disinvestment in lower-resourced communities.

Likewise, some scholars argue that the current definition frames food access as a binary problem (either you are in a food desert or not), which overstates the problem of space when food access is a complex, multi-dimensional problem involving other critical factors such as transportation infrastructure, income, time, and consumer behavior. Several researchers have also cited longitudinal studies that do not observe a connection between food access and health outcomes and highlight data that suggests increased retail access does not necessarily improve the dietary choices and subsequent health outcomes of a community.

Alternatively, scholars propose a model that addresses the complex intersection of individual behavior and food choice with social and political forces to solve issues of hunger, food security, and food access.

== See also ==
- 15-minute city – Urban accessibility concept
- Banking desert – Area with limited access to banking
- Book desert – Geographic area where books are hard to find
- Cost of poverty – Poor people often incur higher expenses due to lack of options
- Digital Divide – Inequality of access to information and communication technologies
- Environmental racism – Environmental injustice that occurs within a racialized context
- Fenceline community – Community bordering harmful industry or effects
- Food choice of older adults
- Food deserts by country
- Food safety – Scientific discipline
- Medical desert – Area that has limited access to healthcare
- Societal effects of cars – Overview of the effects of cars on various societies
- Supermarket shortage – Lack of supermarkets in some American neighborhoods
- Transit desert – Area lacking in transit
