= Michael Batterberry =

American food writer

Michael Carver Batterberry (April 8, 1932 – July 28, 2010) was an American food writer who founded and edited Food & Wine and Food Arts together with his wife, Ariane.

== Biography ==
Batterberry was born on April 8, 1932, in Newcastle upon Tyne, England, his American parents having relocated there while his father was working for Procter & Gamble. He relocated to the United States with his family upon the outbreak of World War II. Batterberry attended the Carnegie Institute of Technology, but dropped out to move to Venezuela with his family, where his father was establishing P&G's presence in Latin America. Batterberry worked as a painter and interior designer in Venezuela and Rome.

After his return to the U.S. in the 1950s, Batterberry worked as a freelance food writer. He married writer Ariane Ruskin, and the two of them were arts editors at Harper's Bazaar. They co-authored On the Town in New York, From 1776 to the Present, a historical gastronomic survey that covered the city's food history from banquets to Chinese takeout which was described by The Washington Post as being "considered the authoritative history of dining in the country's culinary capital".

In November 1998, the publishing firm Routledge issued a new edition of the book on its 25th anniversary. With Robert and Lindy Kenyon covering the business side and with funding by Hugh Hefner, Batterberry and his wife started publishing The International Review of Food and Wine in 1978, which had a prototype issue published in Playboy. Later renamed simply Food & Wine, the magazine's mission was to be a more down-to-earth alternative to Gourmet and its "truffled pomposity", while appealing to both women and men as readers, with early issues featuring articles by such non-traditional food writers as George Plimpton and Wilfrid Sheed.

When it was first published, a senior editor of Gourmet magazine scoffed at the new alternative, saying "We don't look at the others as competition. They look at us, try to copy us and fail miserably". By 1980, when it was sold to American Express, the magazine had circulation of 250,000 per issue, evenly split by gender, and had sold 900,000 copies a month by the time of his death.

The couple started Food Arts in 1988, a trade journal aimed at restaurants and hotels, which was acquired by M. Shanken Communications the following year. Batterberry remained as the publication's editor in chief until his death, with his wife continuing as the magazine's publisher. He and his wife were recognized with the James Beard Foundation Award for lifetime achievement in May 2010. The foundation's president Susan Ungaro called the Batterberrys "legends in the culinary publishing world", having "started a hallmark magazine that people still look to today" after three decades in print.

A resident of Manhattan, he died there at age 78 on July 28, 2010, due to complications of cancer. He was survived by his wife, and as The New York Times noted in his obituary, he was "not survived by Gourmet magazine, which ceased publication in November".
