= Wendell Cox =

American urban policy analyst

Wendell Cox is an American urban policy analyst and proponent of the use of the private car over rail projects. He is the principal and sole owner of Wendell Cox Consultancy/Demographia, based in the St. Louis metropolitan region and editor of three web sites, Demographia, The Public Purpose and Urban Tours by Rental Car. Cox is a fellow of numerous conservative think tanks and a frequent op-ed commenter in conservative US and UK newspapers.

Cox generally opposes planning policies aimed at increasing rail service and density, while favoring planning policies that reinforce and serve the existing transportation and building infrastructure. He believes that existing transportation and building infrastructure reflect what people prefer, while his opponents argue that his positions are based more on a belief that road transport and low density are inherently superior and that public transport is a component of liberal city models he disagrees with politically.

== Biography ==
Cox was appointed to three terms on the Los Angeles County Transportation Commission by Mayor Tom Bradley, and during his 1977 to 1985 service, he was the only member of the Commission who was not an elected official. His amendment to the 1980 Proposition A transit tax measure provided all of the local funding for Los Angeles urban rail projects, including the Blue Line light rail and the Red Line subway. Additional local funding was not obtained until a later 1990 referendum. Nonetheless, he often opposes urban rail systems because he claims that they have not reduced traffic congestion, which he claims is the principal justification that has been used for their construction.

He was appointed by former House Speaker Newt Gingrich to fill the unexpired term of former New Jersey governor Christine Todd Whitman on the Amtrak Reform Council and served from 1999 until the Council issued its final recommendations in 2002. He is vice president of CODATU, an international organization dedicated to improving urban transport in developing world urban areas. He was also a member of the steering committee of the International Conference on Competition and Ownership in Land Passenger Transport, which held its 10th conference in Australia in 2007.

Cox is a visiting fellow at The Heritage Foundation, a senior fellow at the Heartland Institute, senior fellow for urban policy at the Independence Institute (Denver) and holds similar titles in a number of additional conservative think tanks.

He has an MBA from Pepperdine University and a BA in Government from California State University, Los Angeles.

== Urban planning ==
Cox has also emerged as an opponent of smart growth, especially urban growth boundaries, impact fees, and large lot zoning, claiming they have a tendency to raise housing prices artificially and suppress economic growth.

He has authored studies for conservative think tanks such as the Cato Institute, Heartland Institute, The Heritage Foundation, and the Reason Foundation, and for industry groups such as the American Highway Users Alliance, a lobbying and advocacy group for automobile-based industries.

He has also criticized land use policies in the Portland, Oregon area, noting that the area expanded its urban growth boundary to its intended 2040 area 38 years early due to political pressure and that housing prices have escalated substantially relative to incomes.

Cox's consultancy firm Demographia publishes the 'Demographia International Housing Affordability Ratings' and Rankings early each year. The survey has been criticised because it focuses on only price and income, without reference to financing, and for making a number of assumptions some critics claim to be unfounded. Demographia indicates that its measure, the Median Multiple (median house price divided by median household income) has been recommended by the United Nations and the World Bank. This indicates a continuing issue in housing affordability debates, whether to focus on more permanent structural factors (such as price and income) or whether to include more volatile factors, such as financing costs.

Demographia is also publisher of a comprehensive listing of urban area (agglomeration) population and densities. The 6th edition published in 2010 includes all agglomerations with 500,000 or more population.

== Urban transport ==
Cox believes that the goal of public transportation systems should be to provide mobility to those who do not have access to a car, and not to reduce traffic congestion. As such he believes that agencies should seek to obtain maximum value for every dollar of taxes and fees expended, using whatever transportation choices maximize ridership. He believes that competitive approaches (principally competitive contracting and competitive tendering) are most effective in this regard.

Cox's transport site "The Public Purpose" claims that it "is not opposed to urban rail. The Public Purpose is opposed to waste and deception." It argues that "the costs per new rider of all but one of the more than 25 proposed new US light rail and metro systems exceeds the cost of leasing a car in perpetuity. In some cases a luxury car (such as a BMW 740i or Jaguar XJ8) could be leased for less." This has entered the planning lexicon as the "Jaguar Argument."

Cox has suggested a correlation between personal mobility and income. He says public transportation does a "good job of getting people downtown and serving the low-income poor moving around the core, but it can't do any more than that." In response, representatives of the Sierra Club have called Wendell Cox an "itinerant anti-public transportation gun-for-hire."

His more recent transport activities oppose the claim that road congestion reduction is obtained from improving urban mass transit. Among other things, he claims his aim is to improve urban mobility through performance programs that obtain the greatest reduction in travel-delay hours for the public funding available. Cox claims to be "'pro-choice' with respect to urban development," and asserts that "people should be allowed to live and work where they like," consistent with the Lone Mountain Compact, of which he was a signatory.

== Professional activities ==
Cox has completed projects and made presentations in the United States, Canada, Western Europe, Australia, and New Zealand. He has served as a visiting professor at the Conservatoire National des Arts et Métiers in Paris, France. He has lectured in numerous locations, such as the University of Sydney, the University of Toronto, the University of Paris and the Institute of Economic Affairs (London). He participated in a debate on land use and transport with Oregon Congressman Earl Blumenauer at a national RailVolution conference in 2001, and debated Andres Duany on land use policy at the first American Dream Conference in 2002.

His commentaries have appeared in numerous publications, such as the Daily Telegraph (London), the National Post (Canada), the Washington Post, the Wall Street Journal, the Los Angeles Times, the Washington Times, La Stampa (Turin) and the Australian Financial Review.

The National Journal twice honored his Public Purpose website as "one of the Internet's best transport sites".

Cox's consultancy has worked for bus companies as well as for President George W. Bush's transition team.
