= Motonormativity =

Car ownership as the social norm

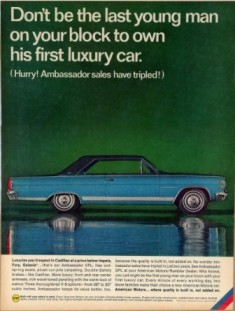
1966 advertisement for the AMC Ambassador

Motonormativity (also motornormativity, windshield bias, car blindness, or, pejoratively, car brain) is an unconscious cognitive bias in which the social norms of private motor car ownership and use, and their societal effects and externalities, are assumed to be natural, universal, inevitable, neutral, and non-negotiable. It is a type of normativity based on the presupposed role of cars in society.

Motonormativity is a systemic bias throughout car-centric societies. It is not limited to motorists; people who do not drive also exhibit the bias. It disproportionately affects those who cannot drive, such as due to age or disability.

The concept of motonormativity describes how car dependency is created and reinforced, and how the health hazards of cars are downplayed and obscured. It also provides a framework to describe social privilege conferred onto motorists and double standards around car use.

== Coinage ==
The term motonormativity was coined by Swansea University psychologist Ian Walker, with Alan Tapp and Adrian Davis from the University of the West of England, in a 2023 study in the United Kingdom. The study was replicated in the United States by Tara Goddard in 2024.

Paul Salopek, while undertaking a multi-year project to retrace ancient human migration paths on foot, noted the mental distance that cars seemed to place between motorists and the outside world, dubbing it "car brain".

== Causes ==
In the century since its mass adoption, the initial public opposition to the car and its dangers has been largely forgotten, in part due to propaganda and advertising by the automotive industry. Cars have become ubiquitous, and 20th- and 21st-century urban planning choices have made them essential in many places, as well as symbols of status, identity, responsibility, comfort and control, contributing to their normalisation as well as to resistance to reducing their use.

People embedded within car-dependent systems may struggle to imagine alternatives to the system or appreciate its harms. One possible factor, proposed by Walker, is conflation of all transport and travel with driving. Another is that environmental and social costs of car use are not easy to compute, causing them to be overlooked.

The bias is reinforced by cultural narratives that supremacise cars and their drivers, and stigmatise and marginalise pedestrians, cyclists, and other modes of transport. People internalise these narratives from various influences, ranging from friends and family, to observed behaviours such as speeding and aggressive driving, to the preferential design of the built environment, to the legal system. This internalization occurs regardless of whether the subject goes on to drive. Some people may initially dissent from motonormativity, but succumb to pluralistic ignorance that Tapp attributes to media misinformation and cultural denialism.

There may be cognitive dissonance about the preferability of cars. Journalist and author Sarah Goodyear suggests that the necessity of driving demands purposefully ignoring its risks: "If you allowed yourself to think about how dangerous that is, it would be debilitating."

For drivers specifically, another suggested factor is the sunk cost of investment in a car, including direct costs such as petrol and parking. On the other hand, since the monetary costs of a car are not paid at the same time as using it (unlike a fare), they are also frequently undervalued.

== Significance ==
According to studies of motonormativity, people are significantly more accepting of negative externalities associated with cars compared to similar non-car scenarios. This demonstrates a pervasive societal tendency to overlook the public health hazards of car-centric systems.

As a consequence of motonormative bias, attempts to reduce car use are often misinterpreted as attempts to curtail personal freedoms such as freedom of movement; cars become the only conceivable form of mobility. Even minor inconveniences to motorists may be considered unacceptable, and thus be flouted or given disproportionate weight. This perspective can escalate to conspiracy theories, such as believing the 15-minute city principle to be intended to limit mobility. It has also been linked to property damage, such as repeated destruction of traffic enforcement cameras in Toronto.

This effect has been documented not just in famously car-dependent North America, but around the world.

== Examples ==
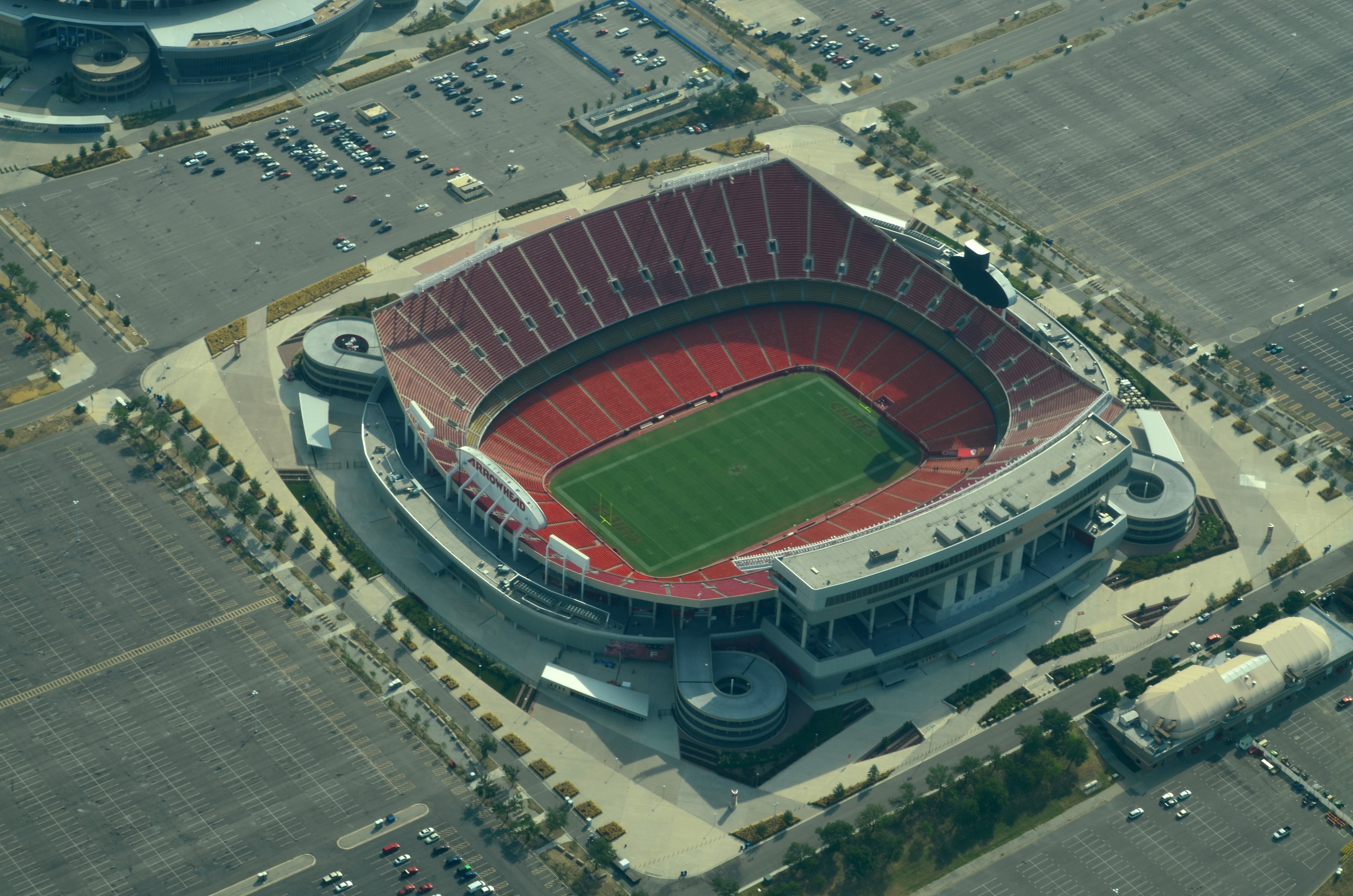
Aerial view of Arrowhead Stadium in Kansas City, United States surrounded by parking lots

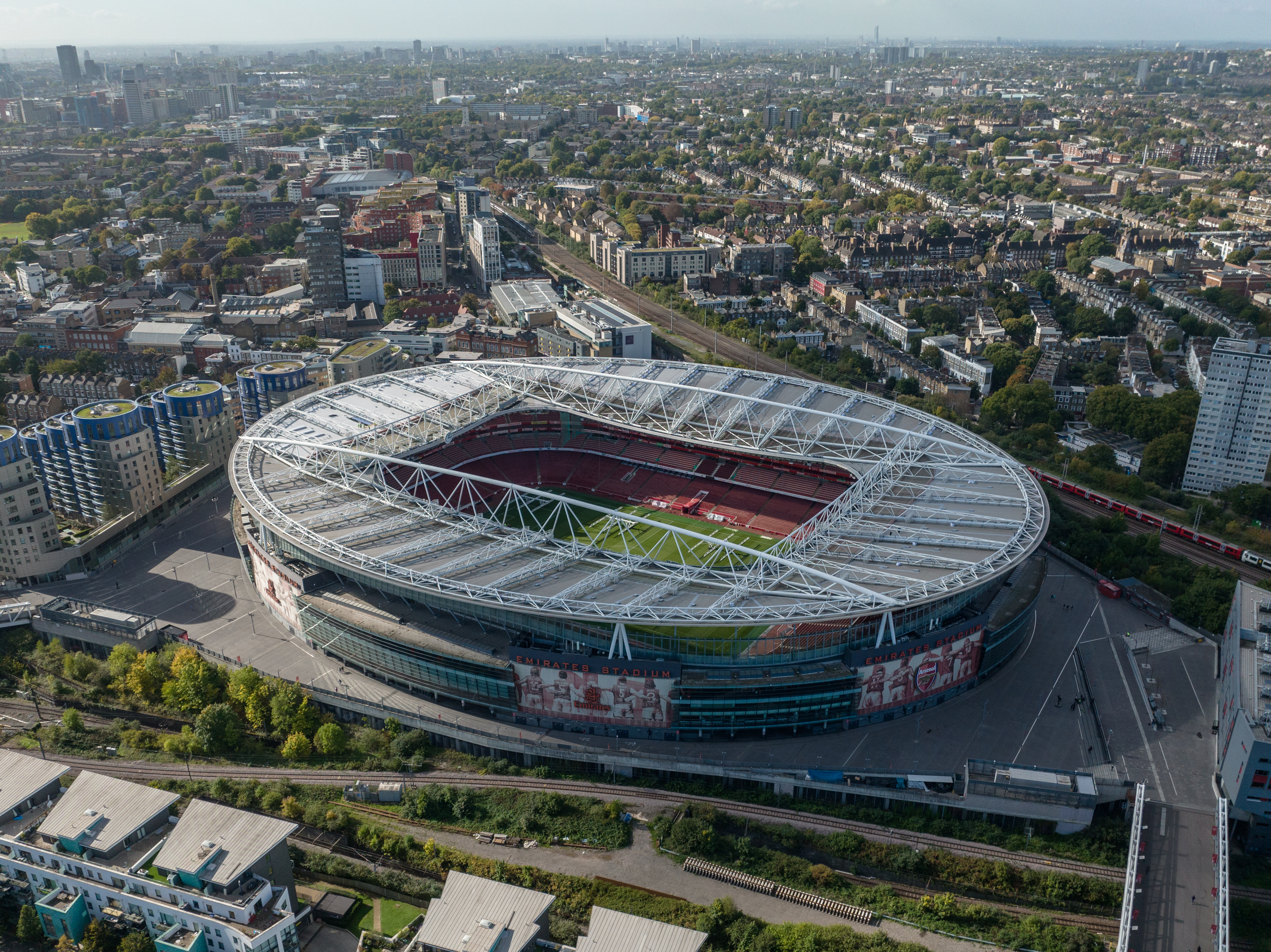
By contrast Emirates Stadium in London has good access by walking, cycling and public transport, so it has minimal parking.

Motonormativity creates the expectation of driving to reach destinations, such as grocery stores, making alternative means of access seem or become unfeasible. It may cause urban planning decisions to overlook non-drivers: for example, a new hospital being built outside a city, even though that makes it less accessible to city dwellers who cannot drive or do not have a car. The assumption that all adults have driving licenses is present even in situations unrelated to driving, and can encumber the usability of other valid identity documents.

Parts of society continue to push back on motonormativity. For example, in 2024, legislation was enacted in California, United States, to forbid discrimination based on driving license status in employment "unless the employer reasonably expects the duties of the position to require driving and the employer reasonably believes that satisfying that job function using an alternative form of transportation would not be comparable in travel time or cost to the employer".

Psychologist Ian Walker has cited certain road safety campaigns targeting children as an example of motonormativity: by encouraging children to wear brightly coloured clothing to avoid being run over, such campaigns normalize the idea of motor traffic as an accepted danger others must adjust to, in a way which in other contexts would be considered victim blaming.

The bias also encourages passive-voiced and euphemistic phrasing, such as accident, to minimize the severity, predictability, and preventability of traffic collisions, to shift blame from drivers, and to create emotional distance.

=== Double standards ===
Motonormativity often invokes special pleading: cars and driving are treated as exempt from general moral principles. Criticism and anger for breaking these principles is shifted toward numerical minorities such as cyclists.

Motor vehicles are relatively tolerated as a leading cause of death in the U.S., compared to other leading causes, such as cardiovascular disease and cancer, which see widespread demand for radical solutions. Similarly, car-related risks are considered less preventable or worth preventing than occupational hazards. Automotive safety features such as seat belts and airbags have been subject to public resistance. Journalists may devote less attention to traffic collisions than to violent crime, despite traffic fatality being twice as prevalent as murder in the United States. Individuals are given more discretion to bend traffic rules, even when merely for efficiency, than to bend other health and safety rules such as for food safety.

A popular example from the studies contrasts tolerance of car exhaust with that of cigarette smoking, which was increasingly banned in public around the turn of the 21st century. Walker argues:

It is nonsensical to say that making people breathe toxic air is a problem when it comes from a cigarette, but it is fine when it comes from a car. The underlying principle is the same, but people in our study were not using the same standards when they judged the two things.

The bias also manifests in blame attribution for theft: If a parked car left on the street is stolen, police response is considered much more appropriate than for other personal belongings, where the owner is then considered more at fault for leaving their property on the street.

== See also ==
- Anti-cycling sentiment
- Highway lobby
- Motorist day, car-related observance celebrating the institution of driving
- Road rage
- Transport poverty
