= Highway Action Coalition =

1971 American society against the 'highway lobby'

The Highway Action Coalition was a civil society organization in the United States founded in 1971 to fight the highway lobby, also known as the "road gang", or “highwaymen”, and to fight for funding for public transportation and pedestrian-focused urban planning. They served as part of a broader movement called the highway revolts, freeway revolts, road protests, or expressway revolts. They were active until at least the mid-1980s.

== Highway Trust Fund ==
In 1956, the United States began constructing the Interstate Highway System, the largest public works project in history. In rural areas the highways were popular, but by the late 1960s many Interstates had begun to penetrate inner cities, destroying neighborhoods, adding pollution, and generating political resistance. Local anti-highway groups sprang up in dozens of locations from Boston to Seattle calling for changes to the Highway Trust Fund, an exclusive source of highway-only dollars from Washington.

== Founding ==
In 1971, Environmental Action and several other organizations launched the Highway Action Coalition (HAC) with the purpose of allowing the federal Highway Trust Fund to be used for mass transit and other non-highway transportation projects. As a result of an article by Denis Hayes [“Can We Bust the Highway Trust Fund?” Saturday Review, June 5, 1971, pp. 48–53] many people fighting isolated highway battles found some national focus and wrote several letters to Denis about their battles. The HAC letter files eventually passed to Gary Nelson and are now archived at the Transportation Library of Northwestern University.

Although the trust fund was among the nation’s most sacrosanct of funding sources, and although it was defended by the political might of the automobile, oil and construction industries, HAC used its citizen lobbying and its publication, The Concrete Opposition, to harness the anger and call for flexibility in funding all modes of transportation.

== Advocacy success ==
On March 14, 1973, in a 49-44 vote, the Senate allowed up to $850 million of Trust Fund money to be spent on mass transit; while the House of Representatives did not go so far, the final compromise did “bust the trust” for the first time. On August 13, President Richard Nixon signed the Federal-Aid Highway Act of 1973—still with the old nomenclature but now allowing spending on transit.
