= Automotive city =

Urban planning prioritising automobiles

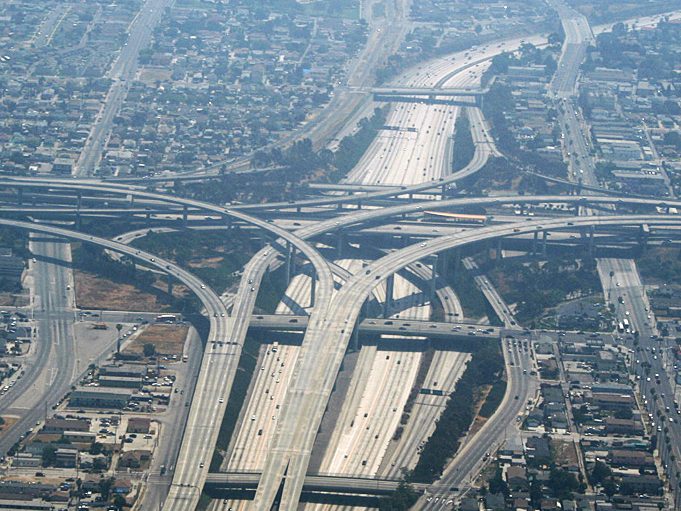
The built environment of an automotive city, the Los Angeles Freeway Interchange

An automotive city, also known as a car-centric city, is an urban area that facilitates and encourages the movement of people via private transportation, rather than public transport, cycling, or walking. This is achieved through both 'physical planning'—such as modifications to the built environment including street networks, parking spaces, automobile–pedestrian interface systems, and low-density urbanised areas with detached dwellings, driveways, or garages—and 'soft programming', such as social policy shaping street use through traffic safety and automobile campaigns, automobile laws, and the social redefinition of streets as public spaces primarily reserved for motor vehicles.

== Origins ==
"The old common law that every person, whether on foot or driving, has equal rights in all parts of the roadway must give way before the requirements of modern transportation" – McClintock, a Consultant for Los Angeles Traffic Commission in 1924. (Norton, 2008, p. 164)

Multiple competing views have attempted to explain the rapid dominance of automobile use over alternative modes of transportation in North America in the early 20th century. Two compelling arguments are:

- That the automobile was selected by city dwellers, as the liberated and preferred mode of transportation.
- That the automobile was deliberately promoted, at the expense of mass transit systems, by the corporate or professional elites, guided by interests in the automotive industry (see General Motors streetcar conspiracy).

While both arguments are nuanced, the basic principles behind each – advocacy of private transportation and advocacy of automobile production and consumption – informed the American automobile manufacturing boom of the early 1900s. By the late 1920s, the automobile industry was producing millions of cars each year, its surging growth due in part to the sociology of industrial phenomena related to Fordism.

The creation of the automotive city may be due, in part, to an attack on old customs by the Good Roads Movement, seeking to pave the way for the rapidly expanding automobile market—and to the triumph of individual liberties, associated with consumption and the free market, over restrictive governance of the built environment and its use. By the 1930s, the interaction of automotive industry interests, a vocal, growing, minority of city motorists and favourable political sentiment, worked together to reconstruct the city street as a reserved space for the automobile, delegitimising previous users (such as pedestrians) and forging the foundations for the first automotive cities.

This transformative process could not have succeeded, were it not for the development, and deployment, of a system of symbols, codes and laws which would become the language of traffic signs, and infrastructure design.

== 20th century ==
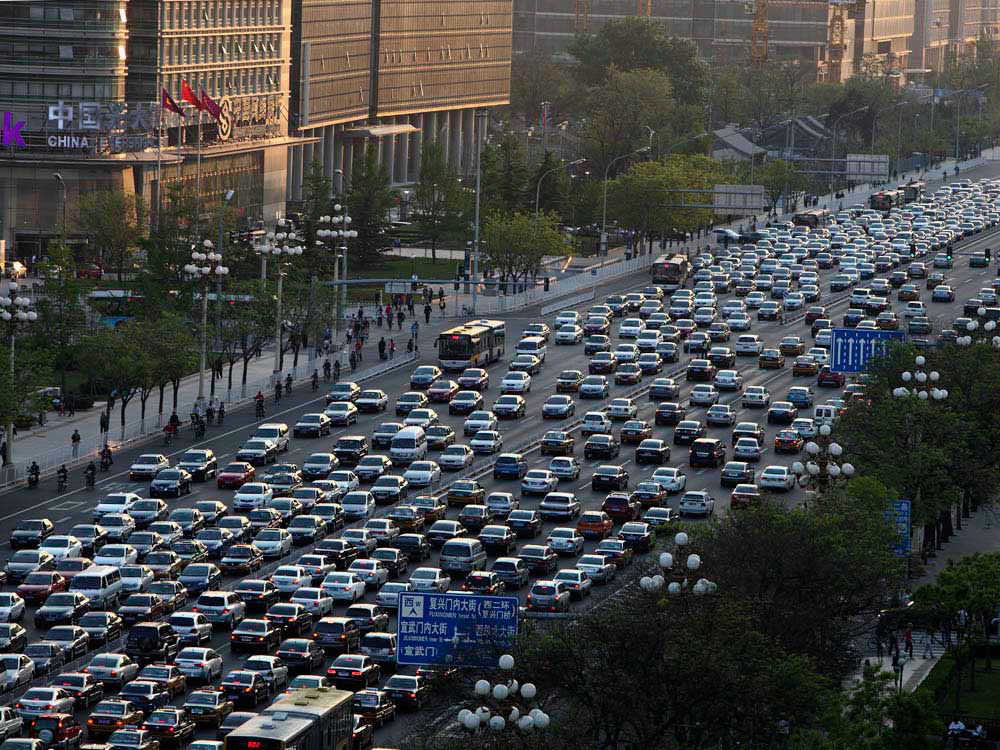
Chang'an avenue in Beijing

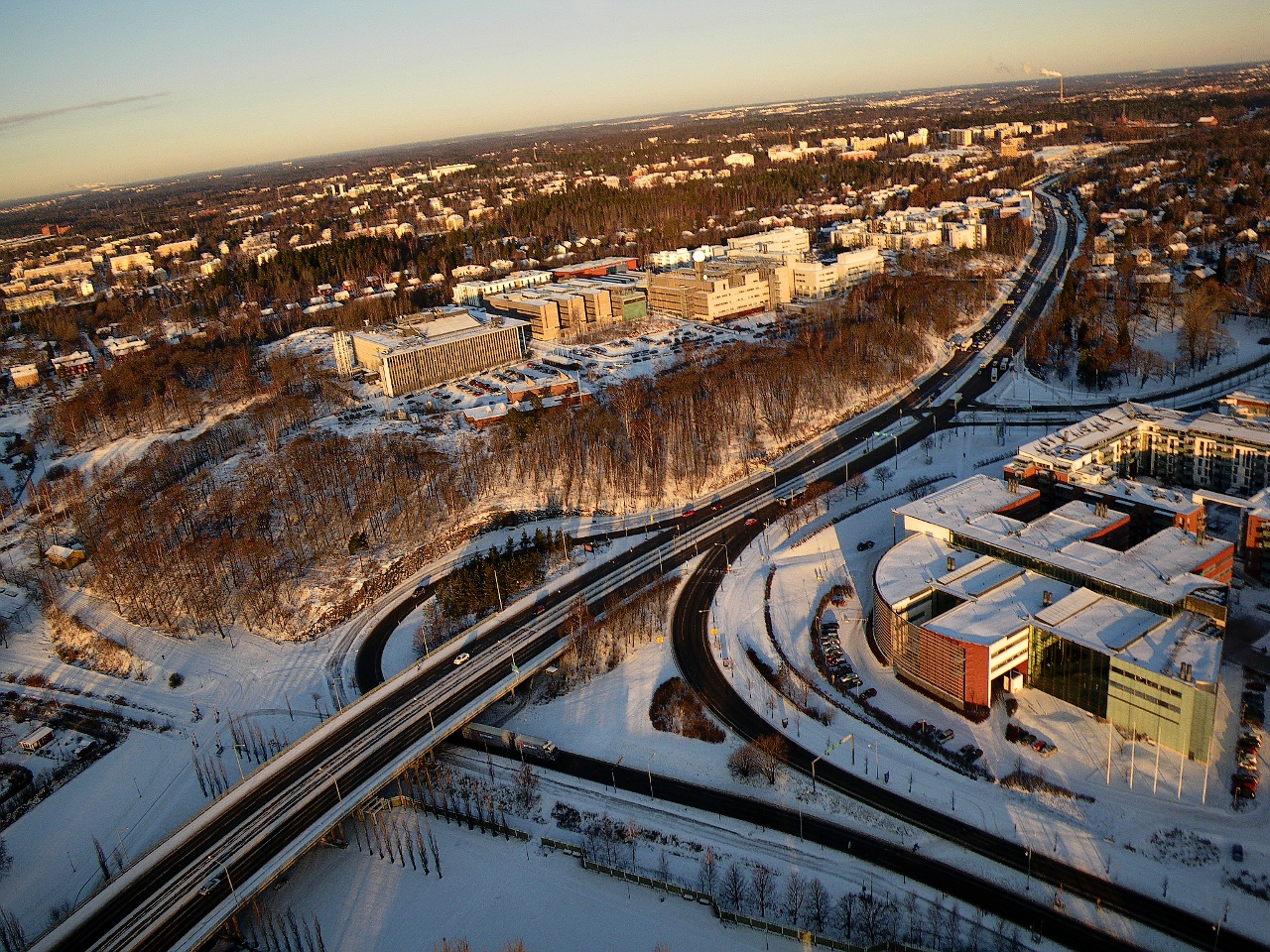
Intersection of Hämeentie and Hermannin rantatie in Helsinki

By the end of the 20th century the automobile, and the land sequestered for its exclusive use (road infrastructure), had become synonymous with formulations of large North American and Australian cities. The label 'automotive city' has been used by academics such as Norton (2008) and Newman and Kenworthy (2000), to refer to the tendency of city design and configuration in many North American and Australian cities during the 20th century to privilege the private automobile above mass transit systems. The creation of the 'automotive city' detailed by Norton in Fighting Traffic, primarily involved the reconfiguration of American city transport infrastructure and services, from the early 1920s to the 1960s, around the growth of modes of private transportation (the automobile).

In the early 1920s this reconfiguration of American city transport infrastructure around the automobile, at the instigation of traffic engineers, resulted in the rewriting of an old English common law (which had previously defined the street as a space where all users were equal) to define the street as a space which privileges cars, allocating them the right of way (except at intersections).

This early and prolonged reconfiguration of the American, and Australian, city around private transportation served to dramatically alter the course of city development within these countries. This is made most tangible through the generally accepted shape the man-made environment has taken in cities such as Melbourne (which never got rid of its tram system), Los Angeles and Detroit, which cater to the needs of automobile ownership (i.e. sidewalks, grid city layout linked with dormitory suburbs, highways and private transport corridors, and the securing of land for car spaces).

Before usage of the automobile was ubiquitous in these regions, and its presence believed to be necessary to the efficient dispersion and mobility of human capital within a centralised, low density, metropolitan area, it was introduced to mixed traffic conditions, and was commonly viewed as a nuisance which endangered historically legitimate street uses. In 1913, New York was experiencing frequent congestion, and by 1915, many individuals had reverted to using the subway.

Chicago's electric streetcar company indicated that it had slowed by 44% in the city's CBD between 1910 and 1920. In San Francisco in 1914, the number of automobiles surpassed the city's 10,000 horse-drawn vehicles. By 1910, Los Angeles had the highest per capita car registration in the world, Detroit and other Midwestern cities followed shortly thereafter. This time period for North America was marked by substantial growth in automobile ownership amongst the population, creating friction between private transportation interests and mass transit interests.

== The road lobby and securing the road infrastructure resource ==
The politics between different transportation stakeholders, who viewed roads as a securable resource and potential source of revenue, manifested in acrimonious conflict throughout the 1920s and 1930s. One particularly controversial example of this conflict occurred between the road and rail lobbies in the 1930s, when a holding company, National City Lines, made up of interests from oil, tyre and car industries, bought the private electric streetcar systems in 45 U.S. cities, before closing them down. The reason attributed to this being clear, each subway car operating on the road was replacing 50 to 100 automobiles.

They were viewed as obstacles to what was generally accepted, among stakeholders in the automobile, as the future of North American transportation.

The purchase, and ultimate closure, of the electric street car systems by National City Lines, occurred approximately 10 years prior to the United States Congress proscription of diversification among rival industries, outlined in the Transportation Act of 1940. The intent of this, in the words of the Interstate Commerce Commission, was, "to protect each mode of transportation from the suppression and strangulation, which might follow if control thereof were allowed to fall into the hands of a competing agency". In 1949 a Grand Jury ultimately convicted National City Lines, and its constituents; General Motors, Standard Oil of California, Mack Trucks, Phillips Petroleum and the Firestone Tire and Rubber Company on criminal indictment of anti-trust conspiracy, this decision did not, however, result in the return of electric street car systems.

280 million passengers were provided with the option of either taking the bus, or participating in the automobile industry. Within a few decades, the golden age of the automotive industry was well and truly under way, with cities such as Los Angeles being almost completely dependent on the automobile.

Substantial funds were required in order to develop and maintain infrastructure capable of sustaining the level of automobile dependence observed by the burgeoning automotive cities in North America. Advocacy for these funds was spearheaded in 1932, by General Motors' Alfred Sloan, who brought a number of automotive industry interest groups together under the banner of the ‘National Highway Users Conference’. The combined lobbying power of this organisation resulted in the substantial U.S. Highway Trust fund of 1957, through which the U.S. government invested $1,845 million in highways between 1952 and 1970. Rail systems only received $232 million during the same period.

The decisive early action of large automobile lobbies in the U.S., in securing road infrastructure funding for their product, helped shape, and protect, the growth of automotive cities in North America and Australia through the 1900s. In many contemporaneous European and Asian countries the influence of automobile lobbies were tempered by equally large mass transit lobbies, and the dependence on the automobile, evident in the urban sprawl of detached dwellings with garages, and accompanying street systems, in North America and Australia, has not been as significant, possibly due in part to this reason

== Suburban exodus ==
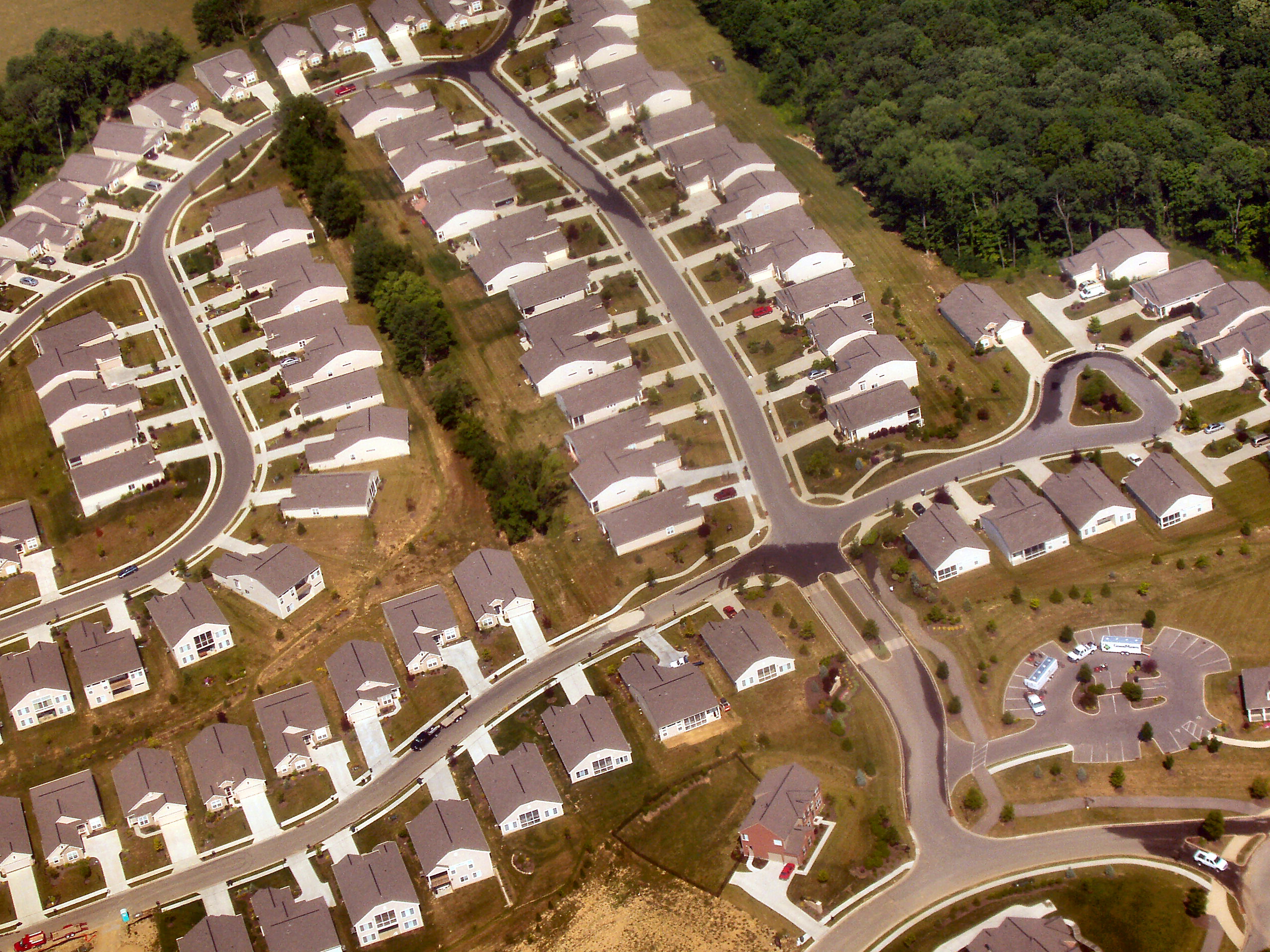
Suburban road plan near Cincinnati, Ohio

From the late 1940s and into the early 1960s the dispersal of the metro population in, and urbanisation of, U.S. and Australian cities correlated with increasing levels of car ownership for the same period, feeding into the political expectation that the car would be the future of urban transportation. The discourse surrounding city structure, which would remain dominant during this period, was succinctly expressed by Homer Hoyt in the 1943 Chicago Plan Commission article, 'American Cities in the Post-War Era'. Hoyt held that the rise of the automobile would remove dependency on fixed rails for public transportation, and that old city design concepts, such as the high density ‘compact city', would be made obsolete due to the advent of the long-range bomber during World War II.

In Hoyt's concept of the ideal post-war American city, low density urban garden homes in dormitory neighbourhoods on the urban fringe would be separated from industry and employment by a green belt, and arterial roads connecting these zones to greatly expanded car spaces at the base of principal office buildings and department stores would accommodate private modes of transportation, supporting independent mobility and accessibility in and around downtown areas. Advocacy for this form of automobile dependent urbanisation, segregation of land uses, and low density expansion of the metropolitan area, was heavily informed by preeminent planned community systems such as Clarence Perry's 'Neighbourhood Unit', and Raymond Unwin's 'Garden Suburb'.

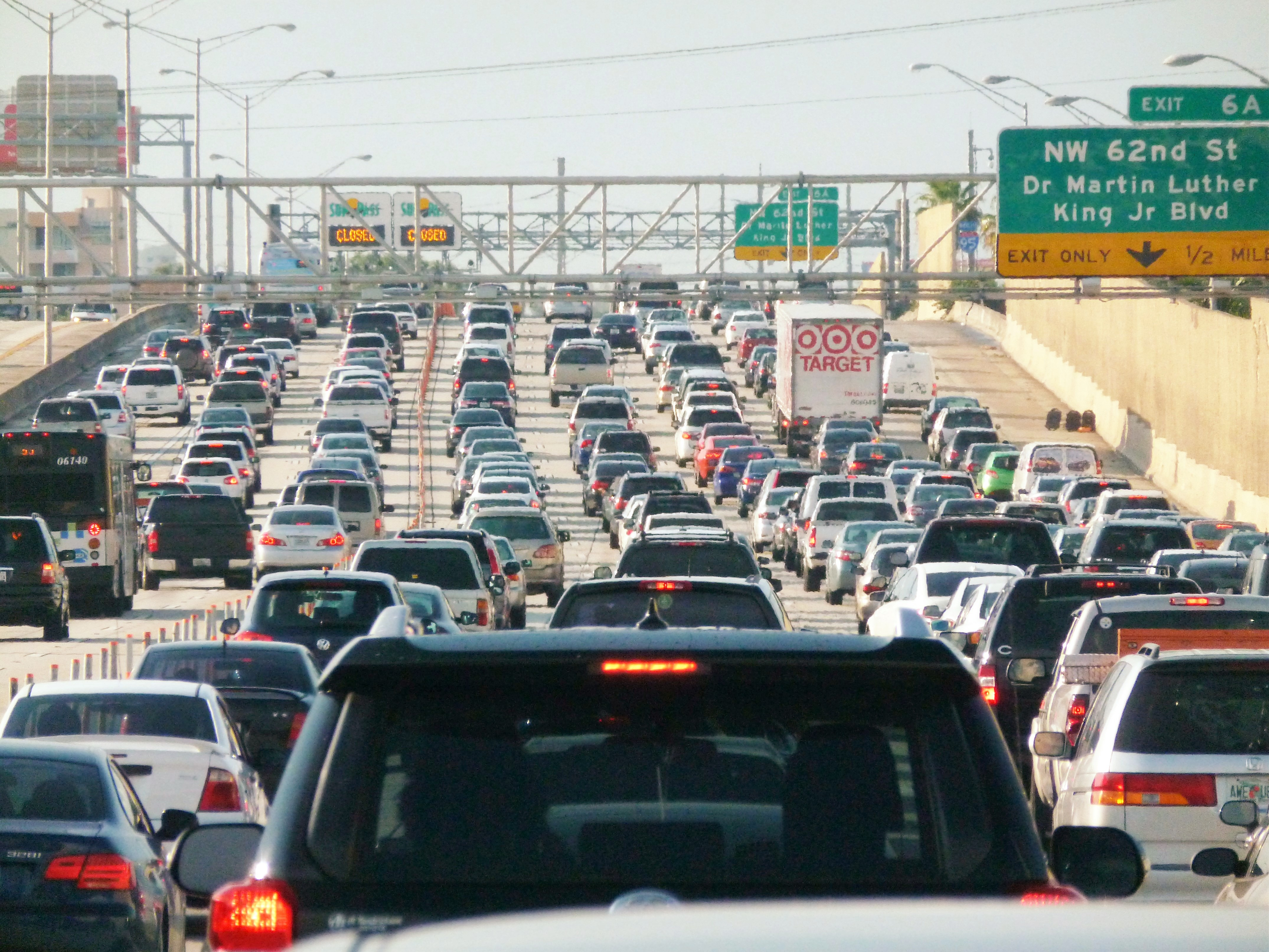
Miami traffic jam, I-95 North rush hour

These new planned suburbs, located at the periphery of the metropolitan area, were advertised as a means of escaping the congestion and pollution associated with inner-city living in the early to mid-20th century. The development of replicable integral neighbourhoods, and processes of urban renewal (characterised by the development of street infrastructure) facilitated a suburban exodus from cities during this period, resulting in the dispersion of the western metropolis. In a short space of time, a considerable burden was placed on the transit networks of many major North American cities, as processes of urbanisation created entire communities, isolated from what were popularly viewed as obsolete modes of mass transit, of automobile dependent commuters.

== 21st century ==
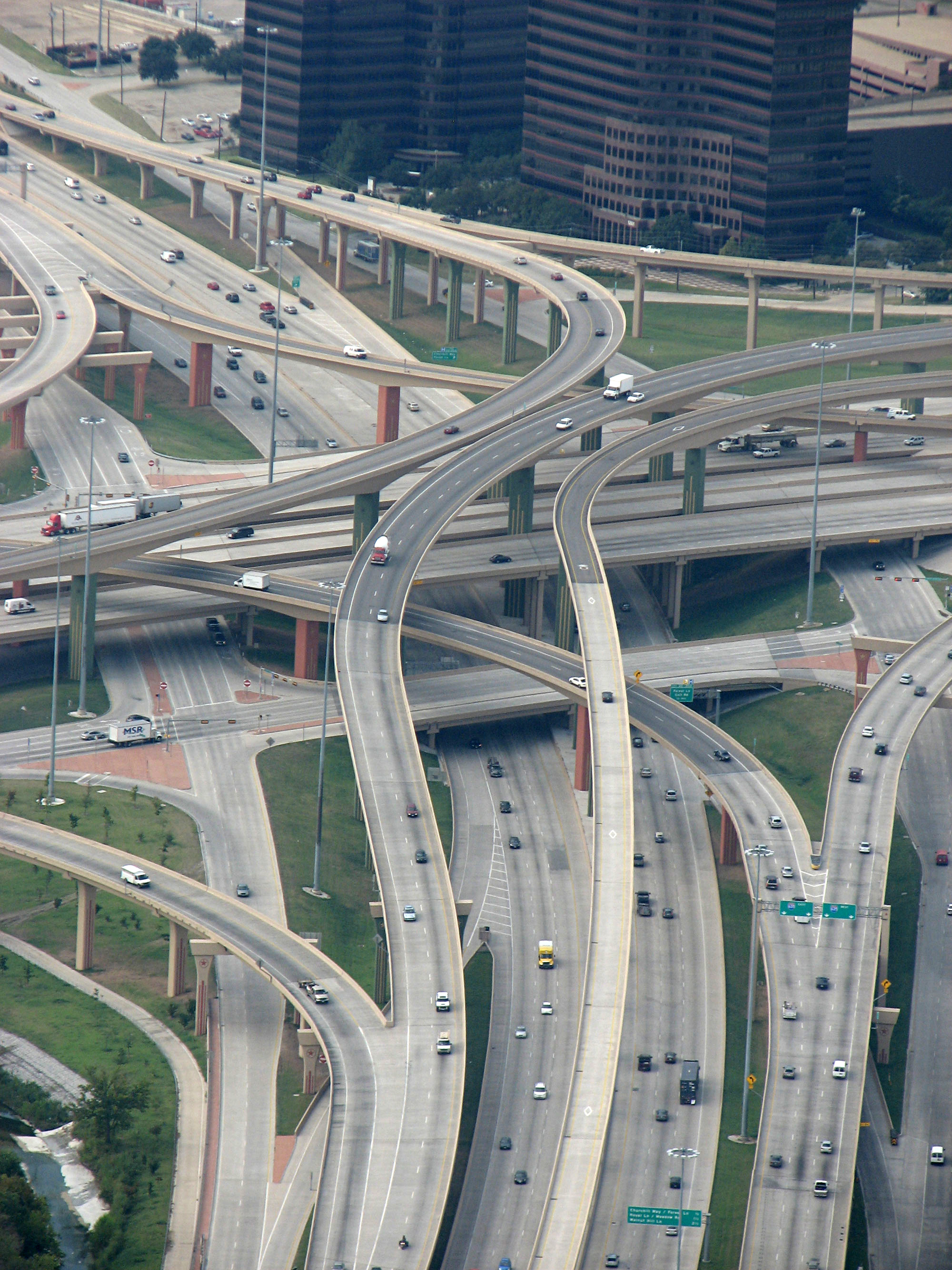
The High Five Interchange in Dallas, Texas, opened in 2005

Twentieth century Western city planning has been characterised by academics such as Vanderbilt (2010) as an exercise in retrofitting the metropolis for the car. While the benefits of private transportation and the mobility it affords citizens in a dispersed metro is widely acknowledged, logistically, it is exceedingly difficult, perhaps impossible, for planners to design a city which efficiently accommodates more than a fraction of its population in this manner. Unfortunately, current research points toward a transportation system which has caused as many problems as it has solved.

As early as 1925, the U.S. Secretary of Commerce, Herbert Hoover, had estimated that urban congestion costs were exceeding $2 billion a year. In 2009, The Texas Transportation Institute issued the Urban Mobility Report (2009), in which the estimated current cost of traffic congestion (in wasted fuel and lost productivity) was $87.2 billion in the U.S.

In Australia, through the twentieth century, Clapton makes the observation that the automobile has, "killed, injured and maimed more people than war has done to Australian soldiers" (Clapton, 2005, p. 313).

In the 21st century Western automotive city, road engineers fight against the phenomenon of induced traffic (new infrastructure creating more congestion), road authorities strive for balance between traffic safety, the independence awarded to private transportation users and the rights of various road users in a democratic society, while land speculators continue to design dormitory commuter neighbourhoods, in cities where planning agencies facilitate (or do not regulate) car dependent sprawl.

== See also ==
- 15-minute city
- Accessibility (transport)
- Carfree city – Urban area absent of motor vehicles
- Jaywalking
- Fossil fuels lobby – Lobbying supporting the fossil fuels industry
- Highway lobby – Collective of industry interests that advocate for an automobile-centric society
- Mobile source air pollution – Air pollution emitted by motor vehicles, airplanes, locomotives, and other engines
  - Exhaust gas – Gases emitted as a result of fuel reactions in combustion engines
- Mobility transition
- Motopia
- Sustainable Development Goal 11 – 11th of 17 Sustainable Development Goals for sustainable cities
- Transit desert – Area lacking in transit
- Transit-oriented development – Urban planning prioritising transit
