= Highway revolt =

Protest against new highways & freeways

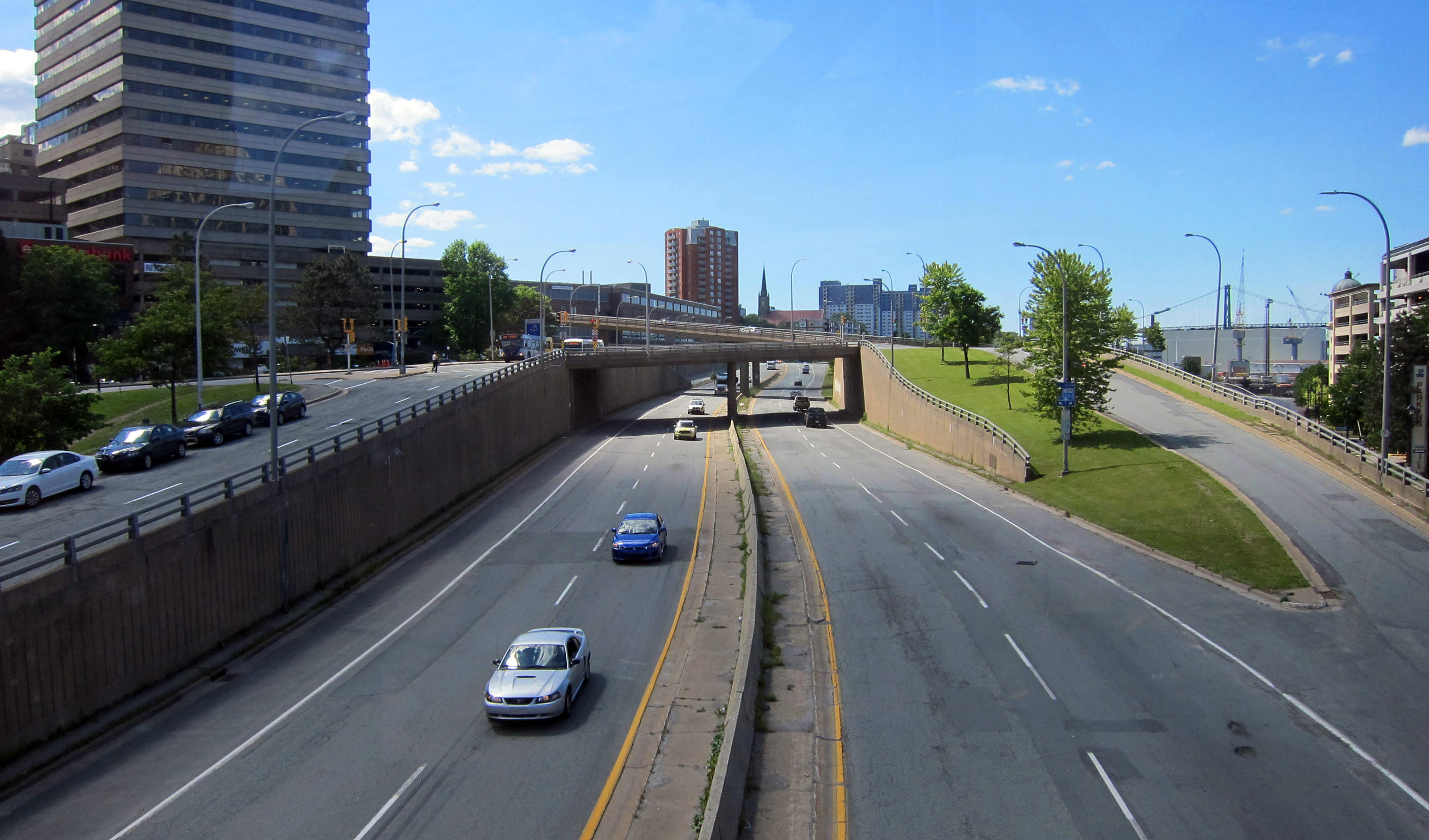
The now-demolished Cogswell Interchange in Halifax, Nova Scotia was the only segment built before its highway was cancelled due to public protest

Highway revolts (also freeway revolts, expressway revolts, or road protests) are organized protests against the planning or construction of highways, freeways, expressways, and other civil engineering projects that prioritize motor vehicle traffic over pedestrian movement or other considerations.

Freeway revolts first took place in developed countries during the 1960s and 1970s, in response to plans for the construction of new freeways, as advocated for by the highway lobby. Some highways were abandoned or scaled back due to widespread public opposition, especially in neighborhoods that would be disrupted or displaced by the proposed freeways, and by those opposed to freeways' other negative effects. Freeway revolts have gained renewed interest in the 21st century, with activists pushing to bury highways underground or remove freeways from cities to repair the damage to neighborhoods displaced by highway construction in the 20th century.

== Australia ==
While anti-freeway/anti-road activism in Australia has not been as vocal as in North America, small-scale revolts against freeway construction have occurred in Sydney and Melbourne, with many protesting toll collection.

=== Melbourne ===
Melbourne saw protests against the 1969 Melbourne Transportation Plan, mostly by those in the affected inner-city areas.

In 1974, 150 residents protesting plans for the F-19 freeway through Collingwood put themselves in front of construction equipment in an attempt to halt construction. In 1978, protesters rallied to defend Gardiners Creek in Kooyong, which was in the path of the South Eastern Freeway. In 1984, over 100 protesters rallied against the widening of Punt Road to become the Hoddle Highway.

Many of the unbuilt freeways were eventually cancelled by change of government, but some projects were later resurrected. An umbrella organisation known as the Coalition Against Freeway Expansion (CAFE) was formed in 1994, and in the following year, 14 of its activists were arrested whilst protesting an Eastern Freeway extension and the partial demolition of Alexandra Parade. The aggressive police response was criticised, and led to the eventual disbandment of the group. One of the largest protests occurred in 2008 in Kensington, one of the areas most impacted by the proposed East-West road connection; it drew wider support due to opposition to the Eddington Transport Report.

=== Sydney ===
Sydney freeway protests have included large-scale green bans in the 1970s, which prevented freeway proposals that would have required the demolition of The Rocks historic precinct and The Domain gardens for freeway developments.

In 1989, 200 protesters rallied against a proposed north-west tollway. In 1991, 150 anti-freeway protesters rallied outside Parliament House. In 1995, over 400 people protested the M2 Hills Motorway.

In 1986, 150 people opposed the Southern Arterial Route through inner-city Sydney. In 1987, 60 demonstrators blocked traffic in Redfern to oppose the arterial route.

=== Hobart ===
In 2009, Tasmanian Aboriginals conducted protests against the construction of the Brighton Bypass. They have stated that construction of the bypass will suffer the loss of their heritage.

== Canada ==
=== Edmonton ===
In 1969, plans called for Alberta Highway 2 to continue into Edmonton, akin to the Deerfoot Trail in Calgary, using 91 Street then descending into the Mill Creek Ravine. However, residents along Mill Creek as well as many others who did not wish to have portions of the river valley destroyed at the expense of a freeway opposed the plans and, as such, they were never completed. The only portions to be completed were 91 Street, Wayne Gretzky Drive and the James MacDonald Bridge. This explains the bizarre look of the James MacDonald Bridge's nearby interchange, which was only meant to be temporary, however serves in its original state today. The plan would have also built a Downtown Freeway Loop encircling the city's downtown core, with freeways reaching out to all corners of Edmonton via present-day Fort Road/Manning Drive/Wayne Gretzky Drive as the Northeast Freeway, St. Albert/Mark Messier Trail as the Northwest Freeway, 111 Street as the South Freeway, 91 Street as the Southeast Freeway and would have the designation of Highway 2, and a freeway running along present-day River Valley Road/Stony Plain Road and 100 Avenue/Baseline Road, which was to be named the Jasper Freeway. While the projects were approved, they were ultimately killed because of cost and the 1978 Commonwealth Games in which Edmonton built an LRT system instead.

=== Halifax ===
In Halifax, Nova Scotia, in the 1970s, local opposition halted the construction of a waterfront freeway, Harbour Drive, after the construction of its centerpiece, the Cogswell Interchange. The massive concrete structure remained a barrier between sections of the city until it was demolished in 2024.

=== Montreal ===
Several areas were destroyed to make room for highways in the 1960s and 1970s. At that time, a historical preservation movement involving figures such as Sandy van Ginkel and Phyllis Lambert prevented a project to run the Ville-Marie Expressway along the waterfront of the Old Port, which would have demolished much of the then-unloved Old Montreal and cut the city off from the river. Many historic homes were demolished to make way for the western section of the autoroute, but the eastern section was reconceived as a tunnel skirting the southern edge of the downtown core and a sunken expressway along the inland edge of the old city. Since then, Old Montreal has undergone significant rehabilitation and is now a desirable residential and commercial district and the city's leading tourist area. Part of the sunken expressway has been covered over (see Quartier international de Montréal) and the section immediately north of Montreal City Hall is also slated to be covered.

Another cancelled project would have seen Rue Berri converted into a north–south expressway, demolishing much of the Plateau Mont-Royal district. Only the portion south of Rue Cherrier was built.

In recent years, protests took place regarding a proposal to extend the Ville-Marie in the axis of Rue Notre-Dame Est, as an 8-lane entrenched highway that would separate the residential neighborhood of Hochelaga-Maisonneuve from the St. Lawrence River. The current plan is to widen the current 4-lane road into a six-lane "urban boulevard" rather than converting it into a full-scale expressway.

Some large road projects from the heyday of the automobile have since been removed at public demand. One of the most prominent was a large interchange at the corner of Avenue du Parc and Avenue des Pins, which had long impeded pedestrian access along a major entryway into Mount Royal Park. The elevated structure was demolished in the early 2000s and replaced with a simpler, at-grade intersection. Another project nearing completion replaces the Bonaventure Expressway with an urban boulevard in the Griffintown neighborhood.

=== Quebec City ===
A large area of the Saint-Roch neighbourhood was destroyed to make room for Autoroute 440 (A-440) in the late 1960s. A-440 was supposed to run aside the cliff to connect the other section of the highway, but this part was never built due to local opposition. This led to a massive 6-lane structure ending on Rue Saint-Vallier. This structure was partially demolished in 2007, along with two ghost ramps reaching the cliff for an abandoned tunnel below downtown. The highway was also supposed to run right through the Saint Lawrence River, until pressure from Beauport residents forced its rerouting to the shore. The elevated six-lane freeway opened in 1974 in Saint-Roch and the ground level 6-to-8 lanes from Saint-Roch to Autoroute 40 (A-40) opened in 1982.

In 2020, the Quebec government presented a project of a new tunnel from Lévis to downtown Quebec City. The tunnel would have two exit connecting to A-440 which leads to opposition from Saint-Roch residents who do not want more cars in the neighbourhood.

=== Toronto ===
During the 1950s, Toronto experienced the same sort of urban sprawl that was sweeping through the United States. Suburbs grew along existing highway corridors, stretching the city east and west, and then northward along the various provincial superhighways. These highways ended at the city limits, however, and there was little route capacity within the city itself. This caused enormous traffic problems within the city, and a network of new highways to address the problem became part of the Official Plan in 1959.

As construction of the network started, the mood of the citizens changed. By the mid-1960s, there was a growing awareness that the growth of the suburbs led to a flight of capital from the city cores, resulting in the urban decay being seen throughout the US. Additionally, several of the chosen routes ran through densely settled neighbourhoods, including some of the more upscale areas of Toronto, like Forest Hill and the University of Toronto. While the opposition was growing, Jane Jacobs moved to Toronto after having successfully rallied groups to cancel the construction of the Lower Manhattan Expressway in New York City. Applying the same formula in Toronto, Jacobs rallied local groups to oppose development of the Spadina Expressway project, while twice being arrested in the process.

On June 3, 1971, Premier Bill Davis rose in the Provincial Legislature and stated, "Cities were built for people and not cars. If we are building a transportation system to serve the automobile, the Spadina Expressway would be a good place to start. But if we are building a transportation system to serve people, the Spadina Expressway is a good place to stop." The expressway plan was dead; construction of the Spadina Expressway ended. The successful outcome of inspired protests of varying degrees to other expressway projects in Toronto including the Scarborough, Richview, Crosstown and East Metro Expressway Projects. This led to none of the other planned expressways ever being built.

Instead of expressways, Davis and his new Minister of Transport, Charles MacNaughton, outlined the "GO-Urban" plan, an Intermediate Capacity Transit System that will serve the Greater Toronto Area in place of expressways. This led to the development of Bombardier Innovia Metro. By the time the prototype was ready for service in the early 1980s, changes in the provincial government ended support for the entire GO-Urban project. Only a single short demonstration line was built in Toronto, the Scarborough RT.

=== Vancouver ===
In Vancouver, a freeway project that began with the construction of the Georgia and Dunsmuir Viaducts in the Strathcona neighborhood was stopped by activists and residents; the plan was intended to link an eight-lane freeway from the Trans-Canada Highway through the East End, destroying much of Chinatown. Before it was stopped, Vancouver's Hogan's Alley neighbourhood was largely demolished. The complete proposal in reports prepared by Swan-Wooster included a six lane tunnel to North Vancouver. An elevated freeway would have run along the Burrard Inlet waterfront, right through property where two Fairmont hotels and many other buildings have since been built. Another elevated freeway would have run through what is now the new portion of Yaletown, where the roundhouse is. It would likely have been adjacent to or above the current Pacific Avenue, between Old and New Yaletown.

The Dunsmuir tunnel, a former freight railroad line of the CPR would also have been part of the freeway. This tunnel is now used by the SkyTrain Expo Line, a rapid transit line using the Bombardier Innovia Metro technology developed for Toronto.

An attempt was made in 1995 to revive part of the project, adding three lanes of traffic to the north shore; it was also killed by public protest.

Successive city councils in the 1970s and 1980s prohibited the construction of freeways as part of a long-term plan. This was taken as far as refusing to have a cloverleaf where the provincially authorized and funded Oak Street Bridge entered the city. It was allowed to enter directly onto Oak Street, but no other approaches were allowed for decades. As a result, the only freeway within city limits is the Trans-Canada Highway, which passes through the north-eastern corner of the city. Very few major roads have been built in decades although the population would likely have doubled.

The conflicting opinions of the City of Vancouver's residents, as represented by their successive councils, and the British Columbia Ministry of Transportation continue in 2013. Many of the suburbs also want more automobile access to Vancouver. The city resists additional cars entering from the suburbs. The province continues to build bridges and freeways throughout the region, but they end at the city limits.

=== Windsor ===
Windsor, Ontario is an interesting case of freeway revolt that was later partially reversed. By 1965, the MTO had completed construction of Highway 401 from the south end of Windsor to the Thousand Islands Parkway and onward to the Quebec border. Plans were announced to extend the freeway along Huron Church Road to the Ambassador Bridge, but residents and business owners along the route protested and killed the plan, leaving the freeway's terminus at Highway 3. Since then, traffic had increased, and a new bridge and freeway was needed. Expropriation of nearby properties began in the late 2000s for Highway 401's extension to a new border crossing, the Gordie Howe International Bridge connecting with I-75 in Detroit. Construction of the Rt. Hon. Herb Gray Parkway, much of it below-grade, began in late 2011 and was completed in 2015. The Gordie Howe Bridge opened in July 2026.

== Netherlands ==
=== Amsterdam ===
In Amsterdam in the 1970s, plans existed for a highway between the end of the A2 at the President Kennedylaan to the IJtunnel, along with the plans of the Amsterdam Metro around Nieuwmarkt. It would have demolished thousands of houses and monuments on its path, and therefore it led to the Nieuwmarkt riots in 1975. The metro was built, but the highway plans were removed.

=== Utrecht ===
In Utrecht, plans to build the A27 led to years of protests and juridical procedures, with a big demonstration occurring in October 1978. Eventually, in 1982, the Dutch Parliament had to decide whether to build or not. A narrow majority of 71 was in favour, 69 opposed. Parts of Amelisweerd were occupied by activists after the decision. The encampment, established by the activists, was evacuated by police and 465 trees were cut down and bulldozed. At the same time a procedure opposing the tree felling was started, however, a municipality lawyer reported that the last tree had already been cut down. Thus the short-term procedure failed to achieve its aim. After the motorway was completed in 1986, more congestion arose on the motorway. In 2009, new plans were made to extend the road from 2x4 lanes to 2x6 or even 2x7. The start of the construction in 2011 led again to protests, with clearly visible banners along the motorway.

== United Kingdom ==
There were protests when the Westway was being built.

== United States ==
In the United States, the "revolts" occurred mainly in cities and suburbs. Many cities have unused highways, abruptly terminating freeway alignments, and short stretches of freeway in remote areas, all evidence of larger projects which were never completed. In some instances, freeway revolts have led to the eventual removal or relocation of freeways that had been built.

== See also ==
- Automotive city – Urban planning prioritising automobiles
- Car-free movement
- Forced rider
- Freeway removal – Replacement of motorways with pedestrian-friendly and urbanist land uses
- Street reclamation – Changing streets to focus on non-car use
- Transit desert – Area lacking in transit
