= Environmental Action =

Organization

- Formation: 1970
- Dissolved: November 1996
- Location: Washington, D.C., Boston, MA
- Members: 22,000 (1979)

Environmental Action is a 501(c)(4) non-profit environmental advocacy organization in the United States. Founded in 1970 by environmental activists at the first Earth Day, it operated until 1996 but was then rebooted in 2012 as part of the Public Interest Network, a family of non-profit organizations that includes the Public Interest Research Group, Environment America, Green Corps and others.

Environmental Action developed the original "Dirty Dozen", a list of members of Congress with poor records on environmental issues. Begun in 1970, it ran annually until 1996 in partnership with the League of Conservation Voters. The group also advocated for Richard Nixon to support the Clean Air Act of 1970, the Clean Water Act, and the Endangered Species Act.

== Overview ==
Environmental Action, a national ecological organization that grew from the enthusiasm of Earth Day in 1970, combined political activism and grassroots organizing with an experimental egalitarian staff structure. Because of this, it was considered among the most radical of the national environmental groups. Based in Washington, D.C., Environmental Action used education and advocacy to create innovative media campaigns and score legislative victories. Operational from 1970 to 1996, the organization spawned dozens of activists who went on to play significant roles across the environmental and social change movements. After its demise, the name was later resurrected by a different entity.

Environmental Action, previously known as Environmental Teach-In, was launched on April 21, 1970, the day before the first Earth Day. It was made up of young activists influenced both by America's pollution crisis and by the anti-war movement of the 1960s. In its founding statement, Environmental Action pledged to focus attention on poor people, African-Americans, anti-war groups, workers and the 1970 Congressional elections. The staff went from organizing Earth Day into lobbying for political change on Capitol Hill, advocating for meaningful new environmental laws and pressing for corporate reform through media efforts and demonstrations.

Because Environmental Action lobbied Congress and was not tax-deductible, and because its paid membership peaked at only 22,000 in 1979, it continually operated over its 26-year lifetime on a bare-bones budget.

== Programs and campaigns ==
=== Dirty Dozen ===
Soon after its founding, Environmental Action named the "Dirty Dozen"—12 anti-environmental congressmen of both parties. Seven of the 12 went down to defeat in November 1970, helping to pave the way for overwhelming congressional passage of strong legislation on clean air and water that year and the next. The campaign also pushed Environmental Action onto center stage regarding environment and the voting booth.

The Dirty Dozen campaign was widely covered in the press, not only in the news section but also through numerous editorials and even in political humor columns. It became Environmental Action's best-known and most effective tactic, even though it was strongly attacked by Congressional leaders who considered legislation to prohibit it. It has since been imitated by numerous other advocacy organizations across a spectrum of issues.

=== Clean Air ===
As part of the Coalition for Clean Air, Environmental Action lobbied for legislation engineered by Senator Edmund Muskie (D-ME) and John Sherman Cooper (R-KY). This marked the first time ever that citizen lobbyists helped to specifically draft detailed legislative language on an environmental issue. Despite opposition from virtually all of corporate America (but key support from the United Automobile Workers), the law was overwhelmingly passed in the House and unanimously in the Senate. In conference committee, Muskie's Senate version dominated a weaker House bill, and President Nixon signed the Clean Air Act into law on December 31, 1970.

=== Supersonic transport ===
Beginning in the 1950s, aerospace companies set their sights on building a commercial airliner that could fly faster than the speed of sound. By the mid-1960s, however, significant environmental impacts were coming to the fore, including massive fuel consumption, potential damage to the upper atmosphere, and a continuous sonic boom emanating in a 15-mile (24 km) wide wake behind the plane. Environmental Action, with Friends of the Earth, the Sierra Club and others, organized the broadest legislative effort to that point by environmentalists Thanks to the effort, along with the plane's dismal economics, the supersonic transport (upon which $1 billion had already been spent) was voted down by the Senate on December 3, 1970 and zeroed out of the budget by the full Congress on March 24, 1971.

=== Ecotage ===
Inspired by "The Fox", a pseudonym under which Chicagoan James F. Phillips led direct action against the U.S. Steel Corporation, Environmental Action coined a new word—"ecotage"—to denote the use of sabotage in the name of ecology. It then held a nationwide contest. The Fox had engaged in extra-legal direct action—including dumping a pail of dead fish on the white carpet of U.S. Steel's CEO and placing a heavy manhole cover on top of a U.S. Steel smokestack—but Environmental Action expressly foreswore illegal actions, soliciting only ideas.

The contest winners, the Eco-Commando Force '70 were feted at a banquet and, in 1972, Pocket Books published Ecotage, a book that was influential on later, more militant ecology organizations such as Greenpeace, Earth First!, and Rainforest Action Network.

=== Bust the Highway Trust Fund ===
In 1956, the United States began constructing the Interstate Highway System, the largest public works project in history. In rural areas the highways were popular, but by the late 1960s many Interstates had begun to penetrate inner cities, destroying neighborhoods, adding pollution, and generating political resistance. Local anti-highway groups sprang up in dozens of locations from Boston to Seattle calling for changes to the Highway Trust Fund, an exclusive source of highway-only dollars from Washington.

In 1971, Environmental Action and several other organizations launched the Highway Action Coalition (HAC) with the purpose of allowing the federal Highway Trust Fund to be used for mass transit and other non-highway transportation projects. Although the trust fund was among the nation's most sacrosanct of funding sources, and although it was defended by the political might of the automobile, oil and construction industries, HAC used its citizen lobbying and its publication, The Concrete Opposition, to harness the anger and call for flexibility in funding all modes of transportation.

On March 14, 1973, in a 49-44 vote, the Senate allowed up to $850 million of trust fund money to be spent on mass transit; while the House of Representatives did not go so far, the final compromise did "bust the trust" for the first time. On August 13, President Richard Nixon signed the Federal-Aid Highway Act of 1973—still with the old nomenclature but now allowing spending on transit.

=== Reforming the electric utility industry ===
Beginning in 1973, Environmental Action waged a two-decades-long campaign to reform the electric utility industry. Among its goals were a reduction in nuclear power generation, elimination of automatic rate increases, and reform of utility accounting procedures. Using media campaigns and guerrilla theater, as well as traditional political lobbying, the group helped pass the Public Utility Regulatory Policies Act (1978) and the National Energy Conservation Policy Act (1978). However, most of the focus was on regulatory agencies and the utility companies themselves, most notably through the booklet How to Challenge Your Local Electric Utility (1974), which sold more than 25,000 copies.

In 1975, Environmental Action revealed that the utility industry had collected more than $1 billion in "phantom taxes" that had not actually been paid to the federal government. In 1978 it published Utility Scoreboard, a comparative rating of 100 major power companies on 15 environmental and consumer issues. The group also regularly clashed with the Edison Electric Institute (EEI), the utilities' lobbying arm. In 1984 Environmental Action revealed that EEI had unlawfully skimmed from utilities' dues $15 million that should have gone to the non-political Electric Power Research Institute.

In its campaigns, Environmental Action regularly caricatured Reddy Kilowatt, a fictional cartoon "spokesperson" for the electric utility industry. The unflattering portrayals led to a 1977 lawsuit by the cartoon's owner, Reddy Communications, Inc. for copyright infringement and unfair competition. Two years later the court found that the caricatures were protected under free speech and dismissed the suit.

=== Bottle bill legislation and wasteful packaging ===
On Earth Day 1970, litter was widely lamented as one of the nation's most prominent environmental ills, and throwaways were held up as emblematic of the problem. Following passage of a bottle bill in Oregon, Environmental Action took on the mantle of national bottle bill legislation, requiring a five-cent refundable deposit on every beverage container.

With insurmountable corporate opposition in Congress, the organization focused on public education and state advocacy, resulting in the passage of bottle bills in Vermont (1973), Maine and Michigan (1976), Connecticut, Delaware and Iowa (1978), Massachusetts (1982), New York (1982), and California (1987). Fifteen years later Hawaii also passed returnable legislation. In 1978, in order to pressure the president to act, Environmental Action organized the "Cans to Carter" campaign, resulting in the postal delivery of an avalanche of 50,000 empty soda and beer cans—complete with educational wrappers and a U.S. postage stamp—from around the country to the White House mail room.

Environmental Action also sought to reduce all forms of over-packaging and solid waste, and it played a role in the enactment of the Resource Conservation and Recovery Act of 1976.

=== Clean water ===
Following passage of the Clean Air Act in 1970, Environmental Action turned its attention to water pollution. With Senatory Edmund Muskie and his Subcommittee on Air and Water Pollution in the driver's seat, this major update of the 1965 water pollution law moved forward with almost unprecedented bipartisan support. The Clean Water Act passed 86-0 in the Senate in 1971 and also in the House in 1972. When President Nixon vetoed it on grounds that it was too costly, his veto was overridden by 52-12 in the Senate and 247-23 in the House. The law went into effect on October 18, 1972.

=== Filthy Five ===
Building on the success of the Dirty Dozen campaign and believing that corporations were as responsible for anti-environmental policies as politicians, Environmental Action in 1977 launched the "Filthy Five" campaign against the trade associations of the nation's five most polluting industries: American Petroleum Institute, American Iron and Steel Institute, Edison Electric Institute, American Paper Institute, and Manufacturing Chemists Association (which became the American Chemistry Council). The announcement received coverage in almost 200 media outlets.

Three years later, in the 1980 "backlash year" when Ronald Reagan was elected president, the Filthy Five campaign was upgraded. This time Environmental Action named five specific corporations (rather than industries) and highlighted both their pollution records and the level of campaign spending by their political action committees. The companies were International Paper, Dow Chemical, Republic Steel, Occidental Petroleum, and Amoco. The group also shone a spotlight on 11 U.S. senators who received the highest amount of campaign funding from Filthy Five companies.

=== Forging alliances with labor ===
Environmental Action was one of the few environmental groups to speak out on the issue of occupational health and safety. The earliest relationship was with the United Automobile Workers, which contributed staff time and money to Earth Day in April, 1970. A few months later, Environmental Action collaborated with the UAW (and the United Methodist Church) in an unprecedented labor-environmentalist gathering in Onaway, Michigan, where 250 participants agreed to build a labor–environment alliance and to focus attention on the need to move automotive technology beyond the internal combustion engine. Soon thereafter, Environmental Action promoted a student–environmentalist alliance in support of the United Auto Workers' strike against General Motors.

Environmental Action also worked closely with the United Steelworkers of America in lobbying for the Clean Air Act and with the Sheet Metal Workers of America to push for the expansion of solar power.

In early 1973, Environmental Action and 10 other ecology groups endorsed a strike and boycott by the Oil, Chemical and Atomic Workers Union against Shell Oil for the company's failure to agree to five health and safety measures in contract negotiations. Calling it "America's First Environmental Strike," Environmental Action took a lead role by creating and staffing the Committee to Support the Shell Strike. The strike settled with a compromise that June.

Two years later, Environmental Action staff helped create a new organization, Environmentalists for Full Employment, to undertake research and advocacy into the many ways that pollution control can provide good jobs.

=== Forging alliances with the peace movement ===
More than other environmental organizations, Environmental Action sought to highlight the connection between ecology and anti-militarism, even choosing to use two anti-war votes on the floor of the House of Representatives in compiling the Dirty Dozen list, explaining that "war is the ultimate ecological catastrophe."

Environmental Action's longest battle against an ecologically destructive military program, from 1974 to 1977, involved the supersonic B-1 Bomber. Working with a coalition of peace and religious organizations, Environmental Action helped defeat the bomber's appropriation, with President Carter canceling the B-1 on June 30, 1977. It was later resurrected, during the Reagan Administration.

== Publications and reports ==
=== Environmental Action magazine ===
Environmental Action magazine, the thread that tied the organization together over its 26-year life, covered all ecological issues, even those far from the group's own lobbying purview. It particularly sought out non-mainstream and newly-emerging topics, and it served as a leading information and advocacy vehicle for the entire environmental movement. Environmental Action prided itself on challenging the motives and methods of corporations and politicians; in the early years, its most popular column was "Debunking Madison Avenue," which exposed fraudulent and misleading advertisements. In 1992, famed author Studs Terkel said, "EA magazine should be required reading for any informed citizen who's concerned about the environment."

=== Other periodicals ===
Environmental Action published several specialized newsletters on individual topics, including The Concrete Opposition, Garbage Guide, Power Line, Exposure, and Waterways.

=== Books and booklets ===
Soon after its founding, Environmental Action published two books, Earth Day: The Beginning (Arno Press/New York Times, 1970), a compendium of speeches delivered around the nation on April 22, and Earth Tool Kit (Pocket Books, 1971), a how-to book explaining environmental problems and describing the politics behind cleaning them up. In 1972, the group published Ecotage (Pocket Books), a collection of entries to the contest the group ran the previous year. In 1990, in conjunction with the 20th anniversary of Earth Day, it published Our Earth, Ourselves, a guide to help protect and preserve the environment.

Environmental Action and Environmental Action Foundation also published a large number of studies and booklets about utility reform, waste reduction, and anti-militarism. These included: Do It Yourself Ecology (1970), The Case for a Nuclear Moratorium (1972), How to Challenge Your Local Electric Utility (1974), Who's Got the Power (1974), Boom and Bust (1975), A Citizen's Guide to the Fuel Adjustment Clause (1975), Bottles and Sense (1975), Taking Charge: A New Look at Public Power (1976), Countdown to a Nuclear Moratorium (1976), Phantom Taxes in Your Electric Bill (1976), Nuclear Power: The Bargain We Can't Afford (1977), Resource Recovery: Truth & Consequences (1977), Talking Trash (1977), The End of the Road (with National Wildlife Federation, 1977), Utility Scoreboard (1978), Accidents Will Happen: The Case Against Nuclear Power (1979), The Rate Watcher's Guide: How to Shape Up Your Utility Rate Structure (1980), Phantom Taxes Update (1980), Green Pages – How to Write/Where to Write: A Guide to Public Interest Groups, Federal Agencies and Congress (1981), Power & Light: Political Strategies for the Solar Transition (1982), Rate Shock: Confronting the Cost of Nuclear Power (1984), Gambling for Gigabucks: Excess Capacity in the Electric Utility Industry (1986), Building a Brighter Future: State Experiences in Least-Cost Electrical Planning (1990).

== Demise, legacy and rebirth ==
By the 1990s, Environmental Action's finances had deteriorated even further, and in 1996 the financial shortfall resulted in a complete staff layoff. Rights to the Dirty Dozen name were given to the League of Conservation Voters and in November, 1996 the organization's files were donated to the environmental archives at the University of Pittsburgh.

Environmental Action served as a linchpin between the pro-nature conservation community and the pro-public-health, pro-worker, corporate reform community. Utilizing grassroots activism, it raised a beacon against rampant consumerism by focusing on its severe environmental effects, from electricity usage to throwaway bottles and cans. The group also demonstrated that decisions can be made collectively and an equal-salary structure can work.

While Environmental Action ultimately closed, it also served as a training ground for scores of young activists who went on to become leaders in such organizations as the Sierra Club, Union of Concerned Scientists, Natural Resources Defense Council, Environmental Defense Fund, Common Cause, Center for Science in the Public Interest, League of Conservation Voters, Solar Lobby, Rails-to-Trails Conservancy, Federation of American Scientists, Smart Growth America, Trust for Public Land and Worldwatch Institute, as well as numerous federal and state agencies, newspapers and magazines, foundations, universities and other non-profit organizations.

In 2012, the Public Interest Network, a family of non-profit organizations, obtained permission from the alumni of Environmental Action to utilize the name Environmental Action, and revived the organization. The new Environmental Action, now located in Boston, continues to advocate for a green and healthy planet.
