= Car dependency =

Concept that city layouts favor automobiles over other modes of transportation

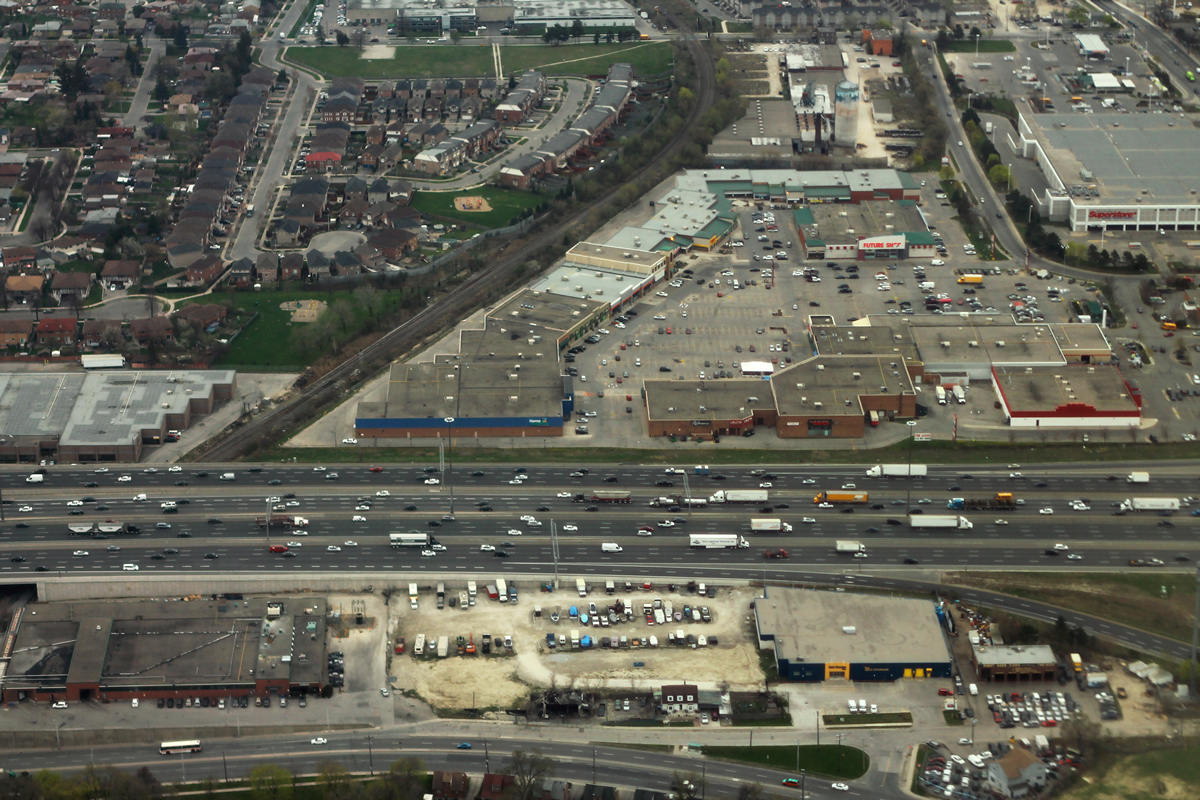
Auto-oriented development is dependent on auto traffic along a major highway like the Ontario Highway 401 in Toronto. Characteristics of such development, as shown, include large parking lots for businesses and cul-de-sac suburbs.

Car dependency (also called car dependence) is a pattern in urban planning that occurs when infrastructure favours automobiles over other modes of transport, such as public transport, bicycles, and walking. Car dependency is associated with higher transport pollution than transport systems that treat all transportation modes equally.

Car infrastructure is often paid for by governments from general taxes rather than fuel taxes or mandated by governments. For instance, many cities have minimum parking requirements for new housing, which in practice requires developers to "subsidise" drivers. In some places, bicycles and rickshaws are banned from using road space, and pedestrian use of road space has been criminalised in many jurisdictions (see jaywalking) since the early 20th century. The road lobby plays an important role in maintaining car dependency, arguing that car infrastructure is good for economic growth.

== Description ==
In many modern cities, automobiles are convenient and sometimes necessary to move easily. When it comes to automobile use, there is a spiralling effect where traffic congestion produces the demand for more and bigger roads and the removal of impediments to automobile traffic flow. Examples of such impediments can for instance be pedestrians, cyclists, signalised crossings, traffic lights, various forms of street-based public transit such as buses and trams, or even houses, parks and recreational arenas.

These measures make automobile use more advantageous at the expense of other modes of transport, inducing greater traffic volumes. Additionally, the urban design of cities adjusts to the needs of automobiles in terms of movement and space. Buildings are replaced by parking lots. Open-air shopping streets are replaced by enclosed shopping malls. Walk-in banks and fast-food stores are replaced by drive-in versions of themselves that are inconveniently located for pedestrians. Town centers with a mixture of commercial, retail, and entertainment functions are replaced by single-function business parks, 'category-killer' retail boxes, and 'multiplex' entertainment complexes, each surrounded by large tracts of parking.

These kinds of environments require automobiles to access them, thus inducing even more traffic onto the increased road space. This results in congestion, and the cycle above continues. Roads get ever bigger, consuming ever greater tracts of land previously used for housing, manufacturing, and other socially and economically useful purposes. Public transit becomes less viable and socially stigmatised, eventually becoming a minority form of transportation. People's choices and freedoms to live functional lives without the use of the car are greatly reduced. Such cities are automobile-dependent.

Automobile dependency is seen primarily as an issue of environmental sustainability due to the consumption of non-renewable resources and the production of greenhouse gases responsible for global warming. It is also an issue of social and cultural sustainability. Like gated communities, the private automobile produces physical separation between people and reduces the opportunities for unstructured social encounters that is a significant aspect of social capital formation and maintenance in urban environments.

== Origins ==
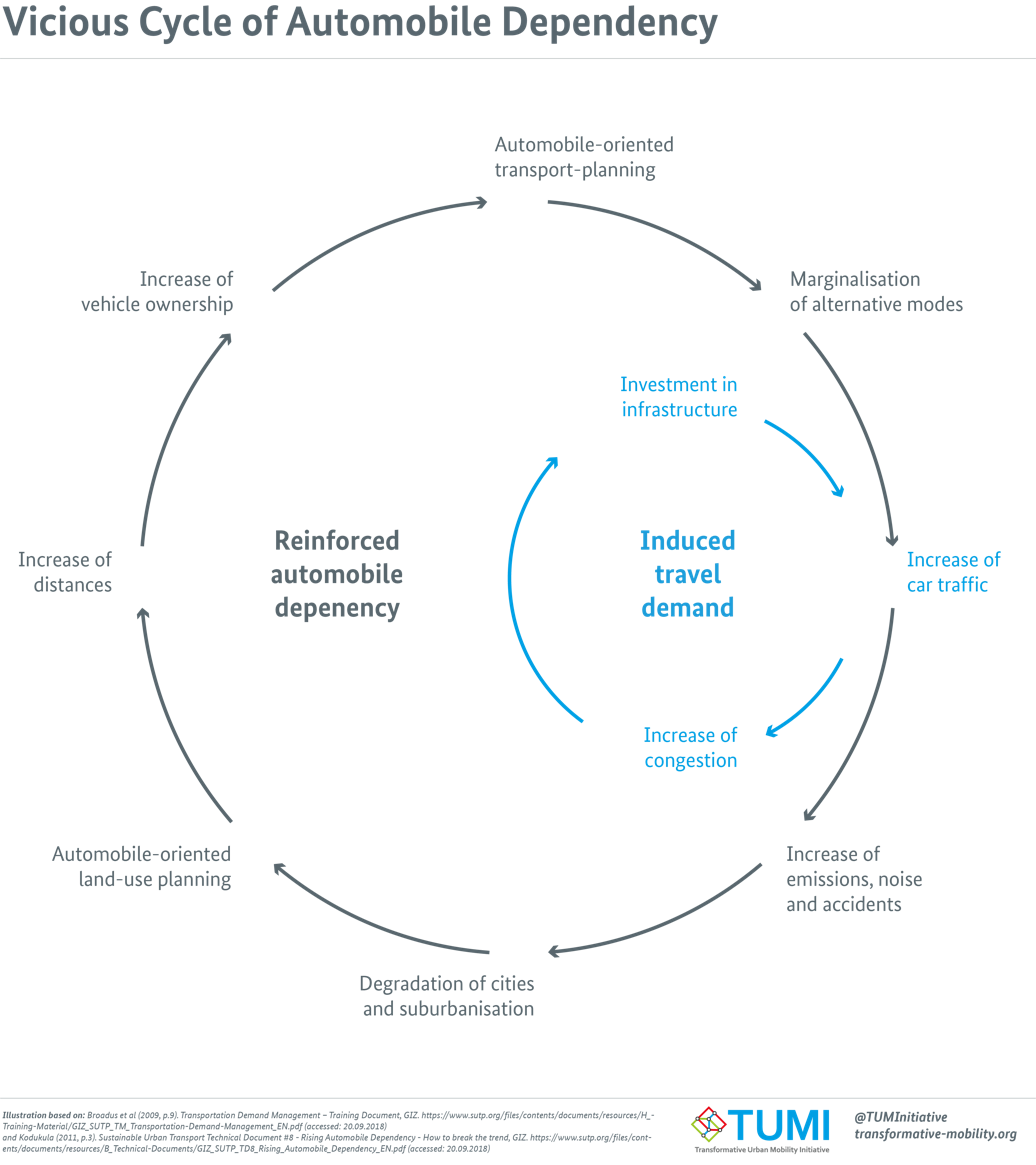
Cycle of car dependency resulting in induced travel demand and thereby reinforced car dependency

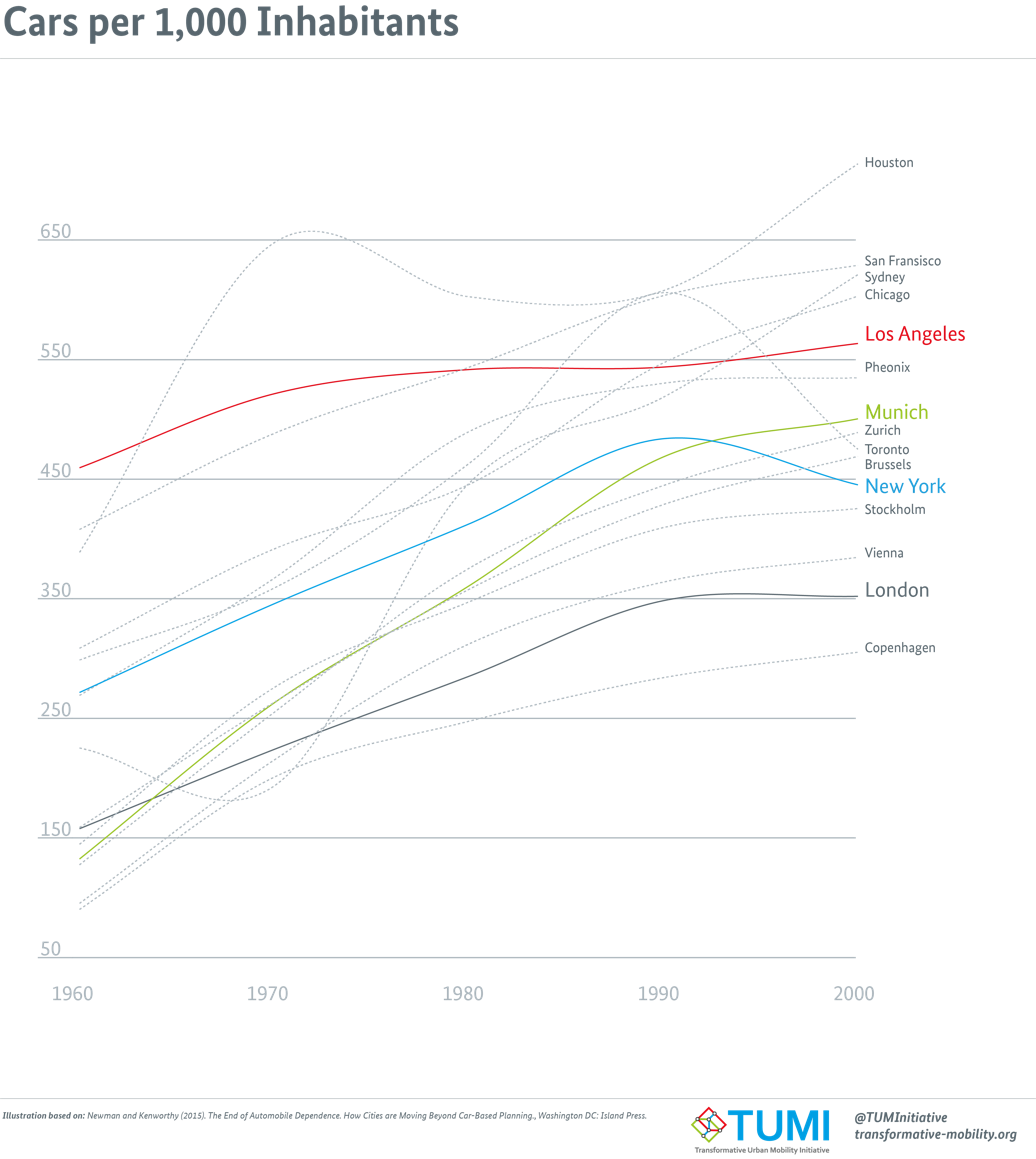
Cars per 1000 inhabitants in US, European, and Australian cities, 1960–2000

As automobile use rose drastically in the 1910s, American road administrators favored building roads to accommodate traffic. Administrators and engineers in the interwar period spent their resources making small adjustments to accommodate traffic such as widening lanes and adding parking spaces, as opposed to larger projects that would change the built environment altogether. American cities began to tear out tram systems in the 1920s.

Leading into the 1940s, American society started to perceive the automobile in terms of necessity, rather than luxury. The automobile effectively filled basic transportation needs, so more and more families bought a car. By the dawn of the 1940s, America had fully embraced the automobile, with 88% of US households owning a car by 1941.

Car dependency formed around the Second World War, when urban infrastructure began to be built exclusively around the car. The resultant economic and built environment restructuring allowed wide adoption of automobile use. In the United States, the expansive manufacturing infrastructure, increase in consumerism, and the establishment of the Interstate Highway System set forth the conditions for car dependence in communities. In 1956, the Highway Trust Fund was established in America, reinvesting gasoline taxes back into car-based infrastructure.

== Urban design factors ==
=== Land-use (zoning) ===
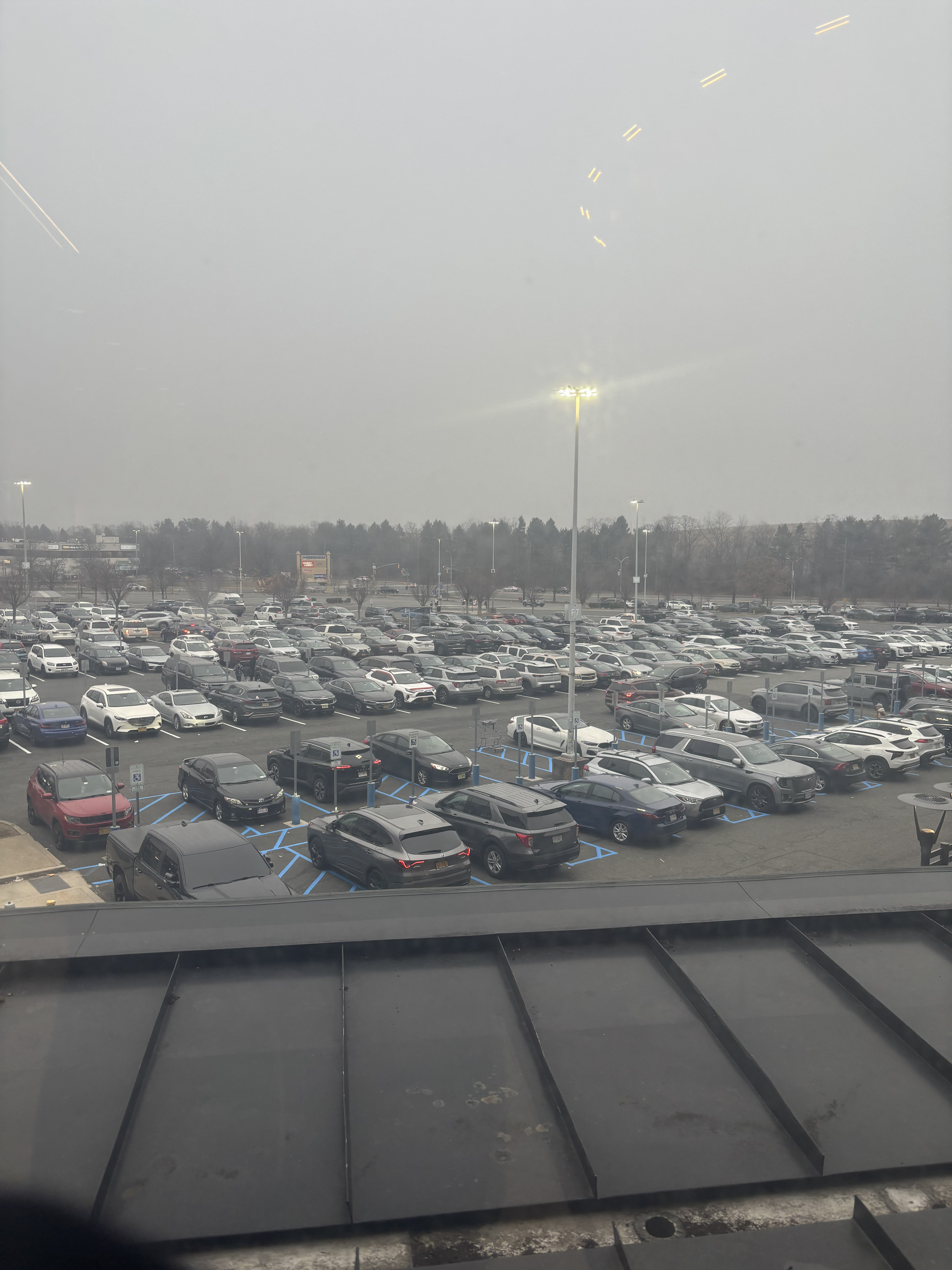
A parking lot showing significant land usage, at the Staten Island Mall, New York City.

In 1916 the first zoning ordinance was introduced in New York City, the 1916 Zoning Resolution. Zoning was created as a means of organizing specific land uses in a city so as to avoid potentially harmful adjacencies like heavy manufacturing and residential districts, which were common in large urban areas in the 19th and early 20th centuries. Zoning code also determines the permitted residential building types and densities in specific areas of a city by defining some areas as single-family zoning, and other areas where multi-family residential is allowed. The overall effect of zoning in the last century has been to create areas of the city with similar land use patterns in cities that had previously been a mix of heterogenous residential and business uses. The problem is particularly severe right outside of cities, in suburban areas located around the periphery of a city where strict zoning codes do not allow any residential types other than single family detached housing. Strict zoning codes that result in a heavily segregated built environment between residential and commercial land uses contribute to car dependency by making it nearly impossible to access all one's given needs, such as housing, work, school and recreation without the use of a car. One key solution to the spatial problems caused by zoning would be a robust public transportation network. There is also currently a movement to amend older zoning ordinances to create more mixed-use zones in cities that combine residential and commercial land uses within the same building or within walking distance to create the so-called 15-minute city.

Parking minimums are also a part of modern zoning codes, and contribute to car dependency through a process known as induced demand. Parking minimums require a certain number of parking spots based on the land use of a building and are often designed in zoning codes to represent the maximum possible need at any given time. This has resulted in cities having nearly eight parking spaces for every car in America, which have created cities almost fully dedicated to parking from free on-street parking to parking lots up to three times the size of the businesses they serve. This prevalence in parking has perpetuated a loss in competition between other forms of transportation such that driving becomes the de facto choice for many people even when alternatives do exist.

=== Street design ===
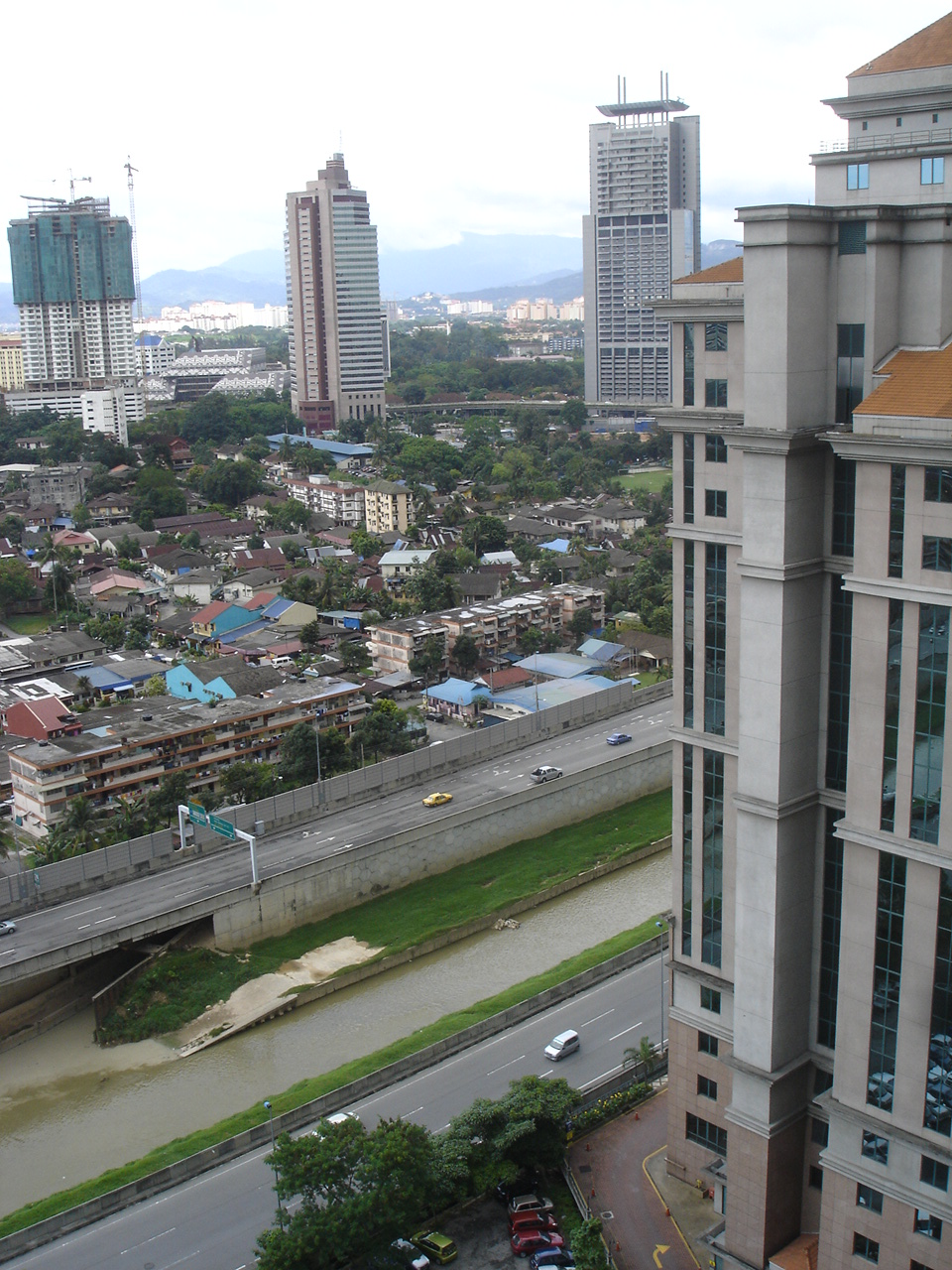
Elevated highway in Ampang, Kuala Lumpur.

The design of city roads can contribute significantly to the perceived and actual need to use a car over other modes of transportation in daily life. In the urban context car dependence is induced in greater numbers by design factors that operate in opposite directions - first, design that makes driving easier and second, design that makes all other forms of transportation more difficult. Frequently these two forces overlap in a compounding effect to induce more car dependence in an area that would have potential for a more heterogenous mix of transportation options. These factors include things like the width of roads, that make driving faster and therefore 'easier' while also making a less safe environment for pedestrians or cyclists that share the same road. The prevalence of on-street parking on most residential and commercial streets also makes driving easier while taking away street space that could be used for protected bike lanes, dedicated bus lanes, or other forms of public transportation.

== Sociocultural factors ==
Sociocultural factors are greatly influential in the emergence and perpetuation of car dependency. These include the rise of car culture, consumer preferences, and the symbolic meanings associated with automobiles.

U.S. state motor vehicle registration, by years, 1900 - 1995 (in millions of vehicles).

=== Symbolism ===
Cars emerged in the 20th century as symbols of modernity, progress, and freedom. They were preceded by the proliferation of railways, which triggered a shift in the previously constrained travel patterns of the population. This change was accelerated by the development of the automobile and the economic incentives that travel introduced. In the United States, for instance, registered vehicles increased from 8,000 in 1900 to more than 20 million in 1927. The growing popularity of individual vehicles prompted the development of new car-focused infrastructure, which in turn fueled the adoption of cars as the default means of transportation.

The automobile as a symbol of freedom was reflected in automotive advertisements during the 1940s. During the early 1940s, the emotional climate of World War II imbued auto advertisements with themes of patriotism and optimism. Even when vehicle sales were frozen in 1942 and manufacturers retooled automotive production into war production, automakers continued to advertise their brand names. In fact, automobile companies started flooding magazines with advertisements to keep their names in the public eye, as well as directly associate their brand with the war effort and freedom.

After the war, advertising themes shifted to fantasy and escapism. Print advertisements for postwar cars were filled with automakers' faith in technocracy and consumerism. Marketers promoted the automobile's functional benefits as well as its symbolism of progress and modernity.

The symbolic functions of cars extend beyond the sense of freedom. The automobile has traditionally signified masculinity, but it has also been associated with women's liberation. Economic status is often displayed through the possession and use of high-end personal vehicles, which are considered objects of conspicuous consumption. A 2024 study conducted in Brazil found that vehicle ownership increases subjects' "mating value" and social dominance. This relationship held true for both men and women, and is amplified when the vehicle owned is perceived as luxurious. These symbolic functions encourage the possession of personal vehicles and therefore contribute to car dependency.

=== Emotional attachment ===
The emotional attachment that driving creates has also been identified as an important contributor to car dependency. Drivers tend to overlook the negative externalities of automobiles and car-centric environments due to the pleasant feelings they experience while driving. Research conducted in the United States shows that moderate levels of car dependency can increase people's perceived life satisfaction. While acknowledging the strong influence of the built environment in this association, the article underscores that psychological factors such as a sense of independence and freedom are also influential.

In recent years, it has been observed that car owners increasingly value personal space and the apparent safety from outside dangers that cars afford. Alternative transportation options compare negatively to personal vehicles in this regard and might be disfavoured by commuters who experience a sense of protection while in their vehicles. The result is a vicious cycle in which car-centric infrastructure increases the risk of walking, biking, or using public transportation, which in turn promotes the use of cars and, ultimately, the construction of more car-centric infrastructure.

== Negative externalities of automobiles ==
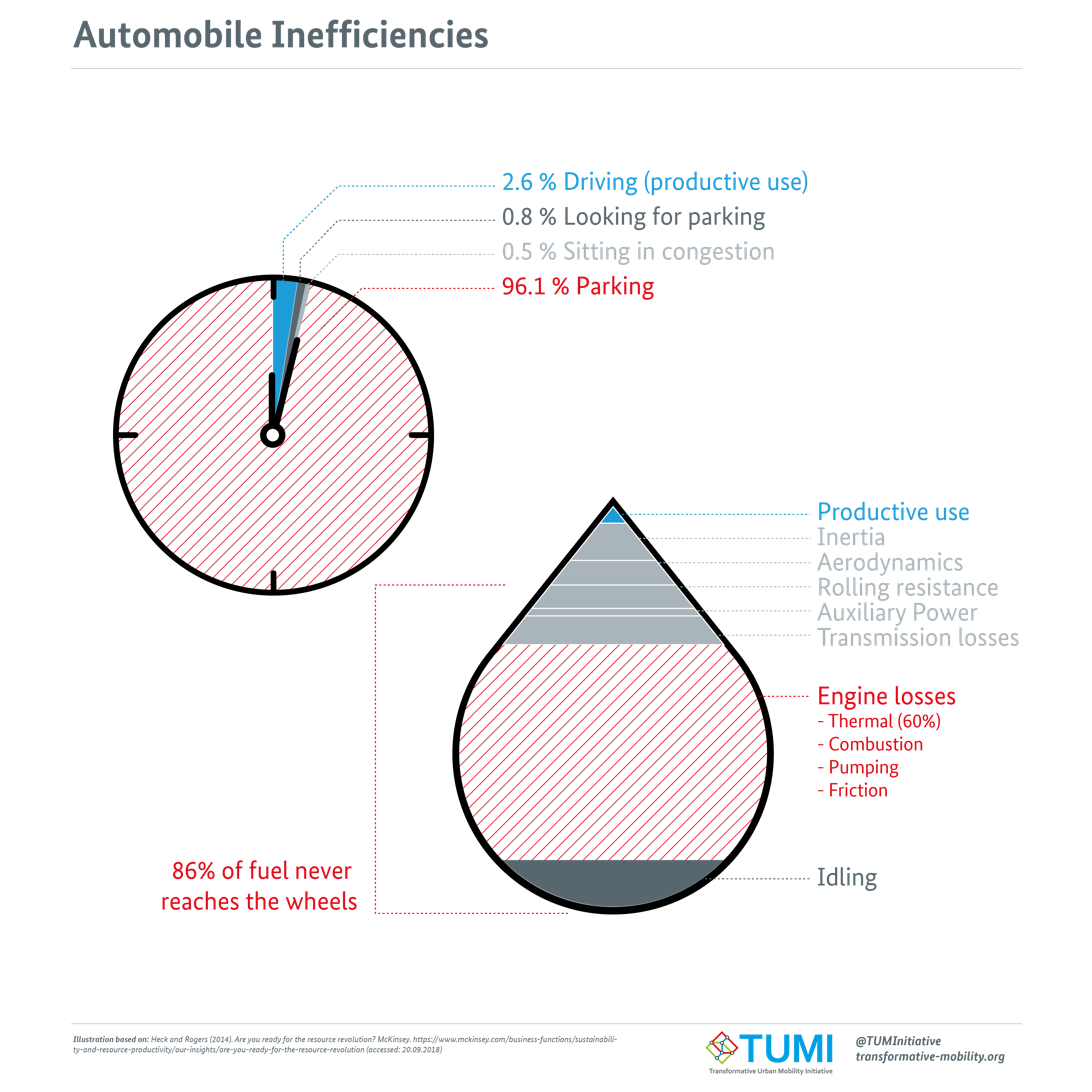
Automobile Inefficiencies

According to the Handbook on estimation of external costs in the transport sector made by the Delft University, which is the main reference in the European Union for assessing the externalities of cars, the main external costs of driving a car are:

- congestion and scarcity costs
- collision costs
- air pollution costs
- noise pollution costs
- climate change costs
- costs for nature and landscape
- costs for water pollution
- costs for soil pollution
- costs of energy dependency

Other negative externalities may include increased cost of building infrastructure, inefficient use of space and energy, pollution and per capita fatality.

== Proposed solutions ==
There are a number of planning and design approaches to redressing automobile dependency, known variously as New Urbanism, transit-oriented development, and smart growth. Most of these approaches focus on the physical urban design, urban density and landuse zoning of cities. Paul Mees argued that investment in good public transit, centralized management by the public sector and appropriate policy priorities are more significant than issues of urban form and density.

Removal of minimum parking requirements from building codes can alleviate the problems generated by car dependency. Minimum parking requirements occupy valuable space that otherwise can be used for housing. However, removal of minimum parking requirements will require implementation of additional policies to manage the increase in alternative parking methods.

Some argue against a number of the details within any of the complex arguments related to this topic, particularly relationships between urban density and transit viability, or the nature of viable alternatives to automobiles that provide the same degree of flexibility and speed. There is also research into the future of automobility itself in terms of shared usage, size reduction, road-space management and more sustainable fuel sources.

Car-sharing is one example of a solution to automobile dependency. Research has shown that in the United States, services like Zipcar have reduced demand by about 500,000 cars. In the developing world, companies like eHi, Carrot, Zazcar and Zoom have replicated or modified Zipcar's business model to improve urban transportation to provide a broader audience with greater access to the benefits of a car and provide last kilometer connectivity between public transportation and an individual's destination. Car sharing also reduces private vehicle ownership.

== Urban sprawl and smart growth ==
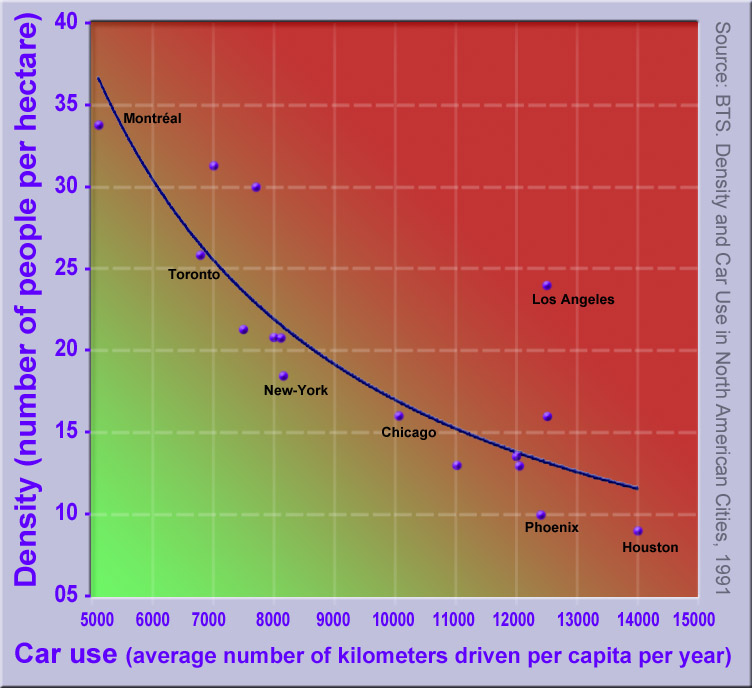
A diagram showing an inverse correlation between urban density and car use for selected North American cities.

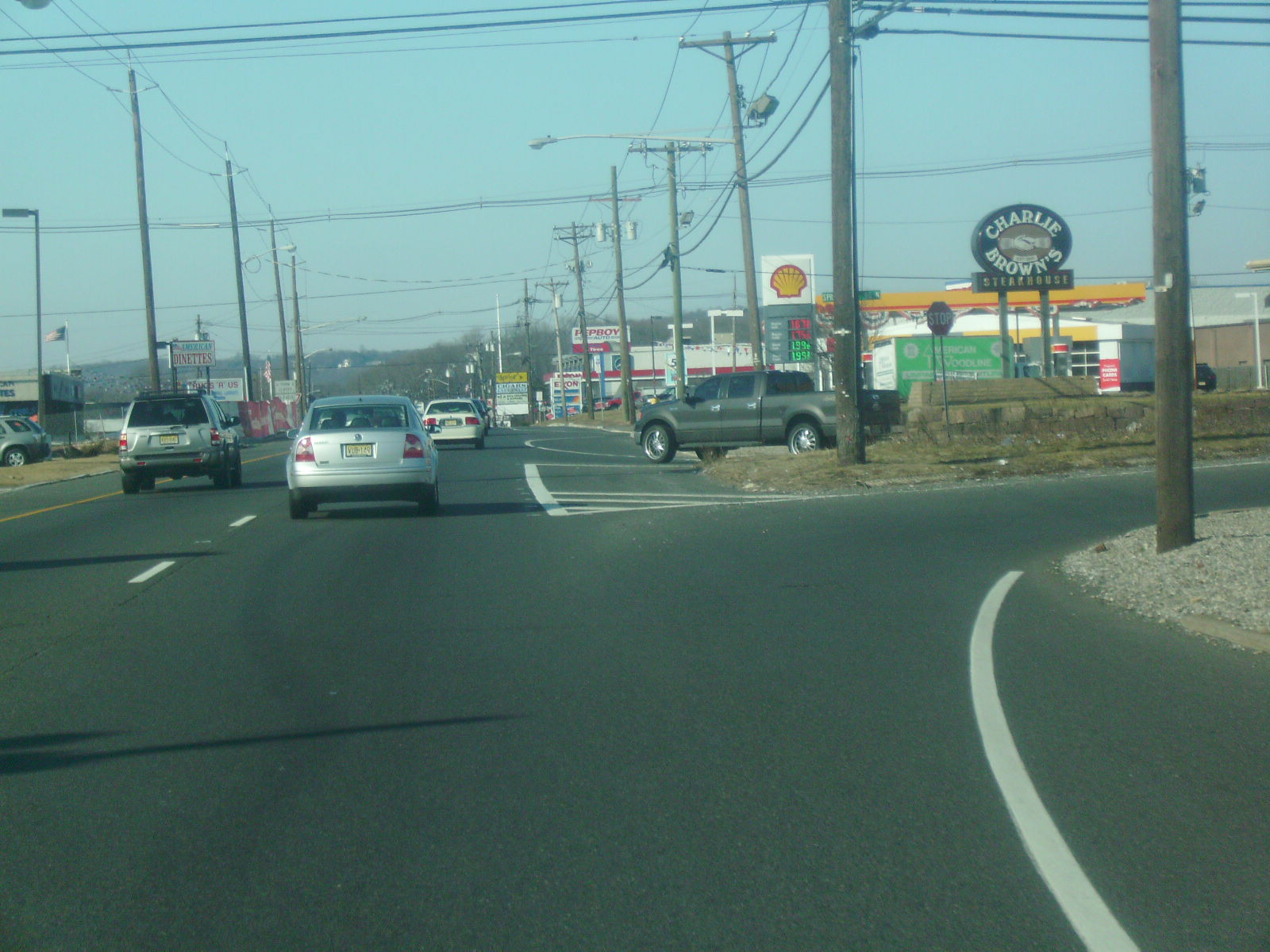
Car dependency is inherent with wide, high speed roadways and spaced out business properties. US 22 in Springfield, New Jersey.

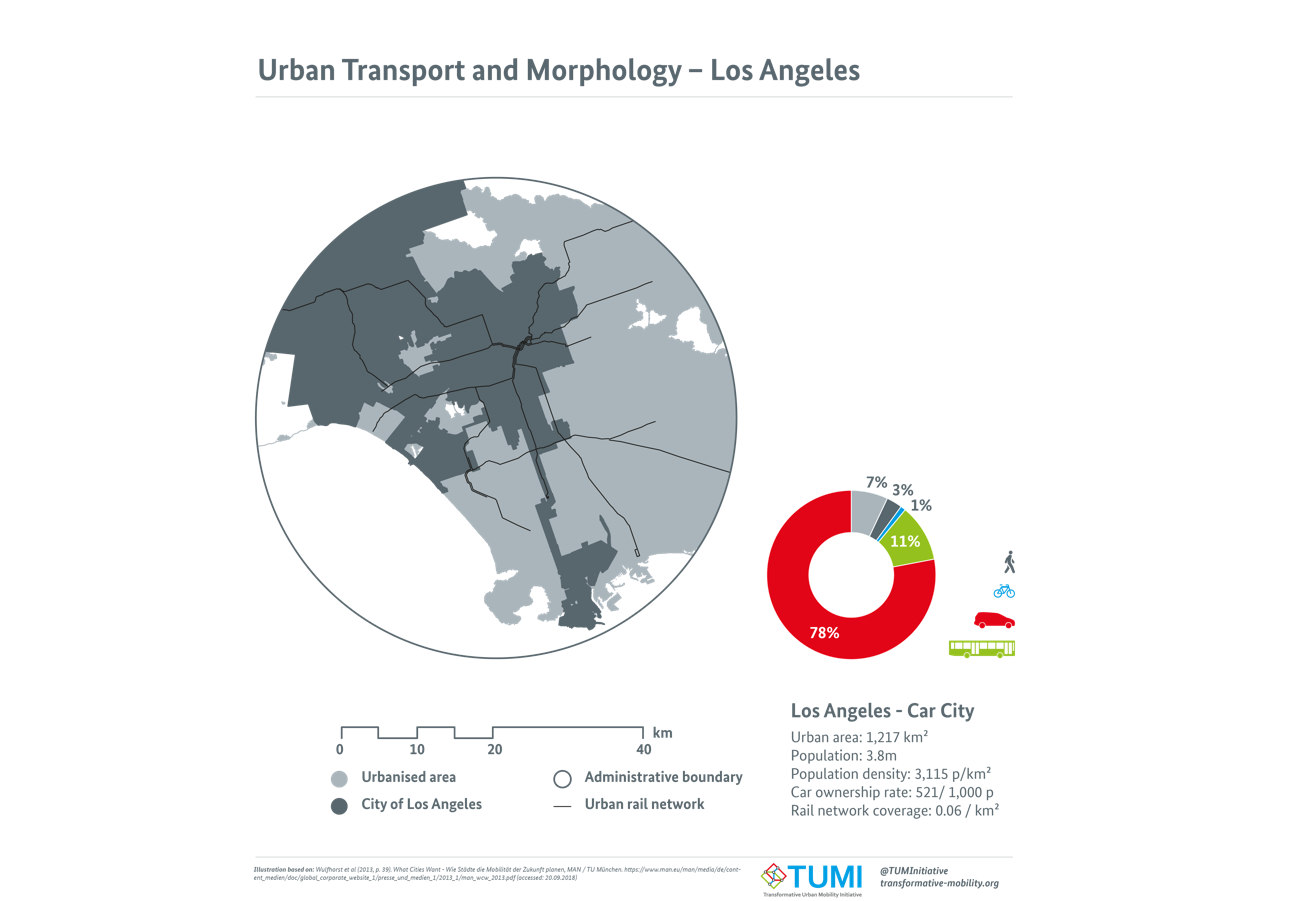
Urban transport and morphology (Los Angeles, 2019).

Whether smart growth does or can reduce problems of automobile dependency associated with urban sprawl has been fiercely contested for several decades. The influential study in 1989 by Peter Newman and Jeff Kenworthy compared 32 cities across North America, Australia, Europe and Asia. The study has been criticised for its methods, but the main finding – that denser cities, particularly in Asia, have lower car use than sprawling cities, particularly in North America – has been largely accepted. The relationship is clearer at the extremes across continents than it is within countries where conditions are more similar.

Within cities, studies from across many countries (mainly in the developed world) have shown that denser urban areas with greater mixture of land use and better public transport tend to have lower car use than less dense suburban and exurban residential areas. This usually holds true even after controlling for socio-economic factors such as differences in household composition and income.

This does not necessarily imply that suburban sprawl causes high car use, however. One confounding factor, which has been the subject of many studies, is residential self-selection: people who prefer to drive tend to move towards low-density suburbs, whereas people who prefer to walk, cycle or use transit tend to move towards higher density urban areas, better served by public transport. Some studies have found that, when self-selection is controlled for, the built environment has no significant effect on travel behaviour. More recent studies using more sophisticated methods have generally rejected these findings: density, land use and public transport accessibility can influence travel behaviour, although social and economic factors, particularly household income, usually exert a stronger influence.

Furthermore, recent research in China suggests that, while density is an important factor, street design and connectivity might be stronger contributors to car ownership and use. This is evidenced by the "superblocks" model, which is currently dominating urban expansion in the country and consists of blocks of 400 meters or more between intersections. Despite their high residential density, a World Bank summary of a study conducted in Jinan reported that per capita transportation energy used in superblocks is two to five times higher than that in other neighbourhoods. Car use was also higher in superblocks, where 33% of trips were by car, compared with less than 8% in other areas. Researcher Yang Jiang attributes these differences to longer travel distances experienced by residents of superblock developments.

== The paradox of intensification ==
Reviewing the evidence on urban intensification, smart growth and their effects on automobile use, Melia et al. (2011) found support for the arguments of both supporters and opponents of smart growth. Planning policies that increase population densities in urban areas do tend to reduce car use, but the effect is weak. So, doubling the population density of a particular area will not halve the frequency or distance of car use.

These findings led them to propose the paradox of intensification:

- All other things being equal, urban intensification which increases population density will reduce per capita car use, with benefits to the global environment, but will also increase concentrations of motor traffic, worsening the local environment in those locations where it occurs.

At the citywide level, it may be possible, through a range of positive measures to counteract the increases in traffic and congestion that would otherwise result from increasing population densities: Freiburg im Breisgau in Germany is one example of a city which has been more successful in reducing automobile dependency and constraining increases in traffic despite substantial increases in population density.

This study also reviewed evidence on local effects of building at higher densities. At the level of the neighbourhood or individual development, positive measures (like improvements to public transport) will usually be insufficient to counteract the traffic effect of increasing population density.

This leaves policy-makers with four choices:

- intensify and accept the local consequences
- sprawl and accept the wider consequences
- a compromise with some element of both
- or intensify accompanied by more direct measures such as parking restrictions, closing roads to traffic and carfree zones.

== See also ==
- Anti-cycling sentiment
- Automotive industry
- Accessibility (transport)
- Automotive city
- Car costs
- Car-free movement
- Cycling infrastructure
- Effects of the car on societies
- Fossil fuels lobby – Lobbying supporting the fossil fuels industry
- Forced rider
- Jevons paradox
- Mobile source air pollution – Air pollution emitted by motor vehicles, airplanes, locomotives, and other engines
  - Exhaust gas – Gases emitted as a result of fuel reactions in combustion engines
- Motonormativity
- Peak car
- Sedentary lifestyle
- Sustainable transport
- Transit-oriented development
- Transport divide
- Urban planning
- Walkability
- 2008–2010 automotive industry crisis

== Bibliography ==
- Mees, P. (2000). A Very Public Solution: transport in the dispersed city. Carlton South, Vic.: Melbourne University Press. ISBN 0-522-84867-2.
- Geels, F.; Kemp, R.; Dudley, G.; Lyons, G. (2012). Automobility in Transition? A Socio-Technical Analysis of Sustainable Transport. Oxford: Routledge. ISBN 978-0-415-88505-8.
- Boussauw, Kobe; Papa, Enrica; Fransen, Koos (2023). "Car Dependency and Urban Form". Urban Planning. 8 (3): 1–5. doi:10.17645/up.v8i3.7260.
- Sierra Muñoz, Jaime; Duboz, Louison; Pucci, Paola; Ciuffo, Biagio (2024). "Why do we rely on cars? Car dependence assessment and dimensions from a systematic literature review". European Transport Research Review. 16 (17). Bibcode:2024ETRR...16...17S. doi:10.1186/s12544-024-00639-z. hdl:11311/1262174.
