= American Highway Users Alliance =

American advocacy group

- Company type: Non-profit organization
- Industry: Automotive, lobbyist, non-profit
- Founded: 1932
- Headquarters: Washington, DC
- Key people: Jonathan Miller, Chair
- Revenue: $808,138 USD (2007)
- Website: highways.org

The American Highway Users Alliance (informally Highway Users, previously Highway Users Federation, National Highway Users Conference), is an American non-profit advocacy group representing many businesses in the automotive and road construction sector. The organization, which was founded by General Motors and others in 1932, merged with the Automotive Safety Foundation and Auto Industries Highway Safety Committee in 1970.

It lobbies for sustained investment in the highway system and claims to have been "instrumental in the passage of virtually all major highway and traffic safety legislation over the past 75 years". It argues that revenue from federal US fuel taxes should be used to fund major highway projects and programs. It publishes research proposals relating to specific highway improvement proposals and regular reports that highlight the most congested roadway bottlenecks in the country.

The organization advocates that strategic development of the highway system would reduce congestion, reduce greenhouse gas emissions and improve Road Traffic Safety.

== Officers and directors ==
The following officials and roles were listed on organisation's IRS Form 990 in 2010. Other interests have been added referenced:

- Norman Y. Mineta, Honorary chairman (United States Secretary of Transportation 2001-2006, Hill & Knowlton 2006)
- Bill Graves, Chairman (Governor of Kansas and president of American Trucking Associations)
- Richard A. Coon, Vice Chairman (President and CEO of Recreation Vehicle Industry Association)
- Thomas F. Jensen, Secretary (Vice President of UPS)
- Roy E. Littlefield, Treasurer (Executive Vice President, Tire Industry Association, Vice President, National Capital Area Transportation Federation)
- Gregory M. Cohen, President and CEO

A further 18 directors are listed, including senior executives from: Ford Motor Company, General Motors, Toyota Motor North America, Alliance of Automobile Manufacturers, Motor and Equipment Manufacturers Association, Recreational Vehicle Industry Association, Chevron, Lafarge North America Cement Division, CITGO Asphalt Refining Company and others.

== History ==
The organization was founded as the 'National Highway Users Conference' in 1932 by Alfred P. Sloan Jr., then president of General Motors, and other industry leaders. Its aim was to advocate for funding of highways to be maintained during the Great Depression.

The 'Automotive Safety Foundation' was founded in 1937.

The organization financed the 'Auto Industries Highway Safety Committee' in 1947, subsequently renamed the 'Dealers Safety and Mobility Council'

In 1970 the 'National Highway Users Conference', 'Automotive Safety Foundation' and the 'Auto Industries Highway Safety Committee' were merged to create the 'Highway Users Federation'.

In 1995 the organization was renamed the 'American Highway Users Association'. In the same year the 'Automotive Safety Foundation' was renamed the 'Roadway Safety Foundation'. The new President and CEO, William D. Fay, said that the organization would be "dedicated to more successful and aggressive issue advocacy" on behalf of the highway community.

In 2004, Greg Cohen, formerly staff to the House Transportation & Infrastructure Committee became the new President and CEO.

The AHUA lobbied for the TEA-21 highway and transportation bill in 1998, the SAFETEA-LU highway and transportation bill in 2005, the MAP-21 highway and transportation bill in 2012 and the FAST Act highway and transportation bill in 2015. It was member of the Global Climate Coalition which operated between 1989 and 2002 and which 'vigorously opposed' the Kyoto Protocol. It was opposed to the American Clean Energy and Security Act in 2009 'dramatically raise the price of highway fuel through a hidden tax on the carbon present in the fuel'.

== See also ==
- National Highway System (United States)
- Transportation in the United States
- United States Department of Transportation
- Highway lobby
