= Highway lobby =

Collective of industry interests that advocate for an automobile-centric society

The highway lobby or car lobby, also known as the "road gang", "motordom", or the "highwaymen", is a collective of industry interests that advocate for an automobile-centric society. It is made up of corporate interests representing the automobile, oil, construction, rubber, asphalt, trucking, and limestone industries.

The term is often used as a pejorative by those who accuse this broad interest group of "Asphalt Socialism", or those who accuse the lobby of nefarious actions. The highway revolts, the Highway Action Coalition, pedestrian movements, and many other modern civil society organizations, are a response to this lobby. One example of the highway lobby is the American Highway Users Alliance that represents its interests. The highway lobby exists in many countries, for example the US, France, Italy through the group "Friends of the Automobile" or Malaysia.

== History ==
In an effort to combat climate change, in 2023, US President Joe Biden's administration proposed a law for the EPA requiring that two-thirds of all new passenger cars in the US are all-electric by 2032. The Alliance for Automotive Innovation, a Washington, DC based trade association and lobby group representing 42 car companies, such as General Motors, Ford, Volkswagen and Toyota, that in total produce about 97% of the new vehicles sold in the United States, wrote in the public comments of the proposition, claiming it was "neither reasonable nor achievable in the time frame covered in this proposal."
