= Wojtyła =

Wojtyła is Polish-language surname. It arose from the nickname which is a diminutive for the given name Wojciech. Notable people with this surname include:

- Karol Wojtyła, later Pope John Paul II
- Emilia Wojtyła, mother of Karol Wojtyła
- Karol Wojtyła, father of Karol Wojtyła
- Edmund Wojtyła, brother of Karol Wojtyła

== See also ==
- Bari Karol Wojtyła Airport

Similar surnames, possibly of different etymologies
- Vogdt, Vogt, Vogts, Voight/Voigts, Voigt, Voit, Voogd, Voogt/Voogdt/Vooght, van Vugt/Vucht/Vught, Vugts
- Voïta/Voita, Vojta, Vojtaššák, Vojtěch, Vojtek, Vojtík, Voytek
- Wójcicki, Wójcik/Voitsik, Woit, Woita, Woite, Woith, Woithe, Wójt, Wojta, Wojtala, Wojtas, Wojtasik, Wojtaszek, Wojtczak, Wojtusiak
- Patronymics: Wójcicki/Wóycicki, Wojciechowski, Wojtkiewicz/Vaitkevičius, Wójtowicz, Woytak
- From Dutch for "foot": Voet, Voeten
