= Wojtkowski =

Wojtkowski (feminine Wojtkowska) is a Polish surname. Notable people with the surname include:

- Agnieszka Wojtkowska (born 1987), Polish badminton player
- Aneta Wojtkowska (born 1991), Polish badminton player
- Julian Wojtkowski (1927–2026), Polish Roman Catholic bishop
- Kamil Wojtkowski (born 1998), Polish footballer
- Maciej Wojtkowski (born 1975), Polish physicist
- Marek Wojtkowski (born 1968), Polish politician

== See also ==
Similar surnames, possibly of different etymologies
- Vogdt, Vogt, Vogts, Voight/Voigts, Voigt, Voit, Voogd, Voogt/Voogdt/Vooght, van Vugt/Vucht/Vught, Vugts
- Voïta/Voita, Vojta, Vojtaššák, Vojtěch, Vojtek, Vojtík, Voytek
- Wójcicki, Wójcik/Voitsik, Woit, Woita, Woite, Woith, Woithe, Wójt, Wojta, Wojtala, Wojtas, Wojtasik, Wojtaszek, Wojtczak, Wojtusiak
- Patronymics: Wójcicki/Wóycicki, Wojciechowski, Wojtkiewicz/Vaitkevičius, Wójtowicz, Woytak
- From Dutch for "foot": Voet, Voeten
