= Wojtala =

Wojtala is a Polish surname. Notable people with the surname include:

- Paweł Wojtala (born 1972), Polish footballer
- Sabina Wojtala (born 1981), Polish figure skater

== See also ==
Similar surnames, possibly of different etymologies
- Vogdt, Vogt, Vogts, Voight/Voigts, Voigt, Voit, Voogd, Voogt/Voogdt/Vooght, van Vugt/Vucht/Vught, Vugts
- Voïta/Voita, Vojta, Vojtaššák, Vojtěch, Vojtek, Vojtík, Voytek
- Wójcik/Voitsik, Woit, Woita, Woite, Woith, Woithe, Wójt, Wojta, Wojtas
- Patronymics: Wójcicki, Wojciechowski, Wojtkiewicz/Vaitkevičius, Wójtowicz, Woytak
- From Dutch for "foot": Voet, Voeten
