= Wóycicki =

Wóycicki, feminine: Wóycicka is a Polish surname. Notable people with the surname include:

- Zbigniew Wóycicki (1902 – 1928), Polish military officer and skier
- Irena Wóycicka (born 1950), Polish economist, anti-Communist activist and statesman
- Kazimierz Władysław Wóycicki (1807 – 879), Polish writer, publisher, and historian

== See also ==
- Wójcicki

Similar surnames, possibly of different etymologies
- Vogdt, Vogt, Vogts, Voight/Voigts, Voigt, Voit, Voogd, Voogt/Voogdt/Vooght, van Vugt/Vucht/Vught, Vugts
- Voïta/Voita, Vojta, Vojtaššák, Vojtěch, Vojtek, Vojtík, Voytek
- Wójcik/Voitsik, Woit, Woita, Woite, Woith, Woithe, Wójt, Wojta, Wojtas
- Patronymics: Wójcicki, Wojciechowski, Wojtkiewicz/Vaitkevičius, Wójtowicz, Woytak
- From Dutch for "foot": Voet, Voeten
