= Wojtaszek =

Wojtaszek is a surname of Polish origin. Notable people with the surname include:

- Anna Wojtaszek, Poland-born Australian retired athlete
- Damian Wojtaszek (born 1988), Polish volleyball player
- Emil Wojtaszek (1927–2017), Polish politician
- Ewa Wojtaszek (born 1959), Polish sprint canoer
- Radosław Wojtaszek (born 1987), Polish chess Grandmaster

== See also ==
Similar surnames, possibly of different etymologies
- Vogdt, Vogt, Vogts, Voight/Voigts, Voigt, Voit, Voogd, Voogt/Voogdt/Vooght, van Vugt/Vucht/Vught, Vugts
- Voïta/Voita, Vojta, Vojtaššák, Vojtěch, Vojtek, Vojtík, Voytek
- Wójcik/Voitsik, Woit, Woita, Woite, Woith, Woithe, Wójt, Wojta, Wojtas
- Patronymics: Wójcicki, Wojciechowski, Wojtkiewicz/Vaitkevičius, Wójtowicz, Woytak
- From Dutch for "foot": Voet, Voeten
