= Voïta =

Voïta is a surname. Notable people with the surname include:

- Denise Voïta, Swiss painter, designer, lithographer, and tapestry designer
- Michel Voïta (born 1957), Swiss actor
- Mykala Voita, American politician

== See also ==
Similar surnames, possibly of different etymologies
- Vogdt, Vogt, Vogts, Voight/Voigts, Voigt, Voit, Voogd, Voogt/Voogdt/Vooght, van Vugt/Vucht/Vught, Vugts
- Voita, Vojta, Vojtaššák, Vojtěch, Vojtek, Vojtík, Voytek
- Wójcik/Voitsik, Woit, Woita, Woite, Woith, Woithe, Wójt, Wojta, Wojtas
- Patronymics: Wójcicki, Wojciechowski, Wojtkiewicz/Vaitkevičius, Wójtowicz, Woytak
- From Dutch for "foot": Voet, Voeten
