= Vogt (surname) =

Vogt (German: [foːkt]) is a German occupational surname derived from the occupation of vogt. Notable people with the surname include:

== Politicians and civil servants ==
- Alexander Vogt (born 1978), German politician
- Andreas Vogt (1880–1958), Liechtenstein politician
- Andreas Vogt (politician, born 1918) (1918–2002), Liechtenstein politician
- Alois Vogt (1906–1988), Liechtenstein politician
- Basil Vogt (1878–1939), Liechtenstein politician
- Benjamin Vogt (politician) (1863–1947), Norwegian politician
- Charles Vogt Jr. (1908–1975), American politician from Nebraska
- Christopher Vogt (born 1984), German politician
- Daniel A. Vogt, Florida politician, Civil War era
- David Vogt (1793–1861), Norwegian politician
- Franz Vogt (1899–1940), German trade unionist
- Franz Vogt (politician) (1918–2001), Liechtenstein politician
- Georg Vogt (1879–1943), Liechtenstein politician
- Günter Vogt (born 1961), Liechtenstein politician
- Hersleb Vogt (1912–1999), Norwegian diplomat
- Hilde Vogt (born 1945), Norwegian politician
- Jan Fredrik Vogt (born 1974), Norwegian politician
- Johanna Vogt (1862–1944), German suffragist and first female city council member in Kassel
- John Vogt (politician) (1936–2018), American politician from Florida
- Jørgen Vogt (1900–1972), Norwegian politician
- Jørgen Herman Vogt (1784–1862), Norwegian politician
- Lorenz Juhl Vogt (1828–1901), Norwegian politician
- Niels Nielsen Vogt (1798–1869), Norwegian politician
- Nils Vogt (civil servant) (1926–2000), Norwegian civil servant
- Nils Vogt (politician) (1817–1894), Norwegian politician
- Oliver Vogt (born 1977), German politician
- Paul Benjamin Vogt (1863–1947), Norwegian politician
- Roland Vogt (1941–2018), German politician
- Svend Borchmann Hersleb Vogt (1852–1923), Norwegian politician
- Thomas Vogt (politician) (born 1976), Liechtenstein politician
- Tobias Vogt (politician, born 1985), German politician
- Tobias Vogt (politician, born 1988), German politician
- Ute Vogt (born 1964), German politician
- Walter Vogt (politician) (born 1947), Liechtenstein politician
- Wolfgang Vogt (1929-2006), German politician

== Science and enginering ==
- Carl Vogt (1817–1895), German scientist and philosopher
- Erich Vogt (1929–2014), Canadian physicist
- Evon Z. Vogt (1918–2004), American anthropologist
- Fredrik Vogt (1892–1970), Norwegian engineer
- George B. Vogt (1920–1990), American entomologist
- Hannah Vogt (1910–1994), German historian
- Hans Vogt (1903–1986), Norwegian linguist
- Jens Theodor Paludan Vogt (1830–1892), Norwegian engineer
- Johan Herman Lie Vogt (1858–1932), Norwegian geologist
- Marthe Louise Vogt (1903–2003), German neuroscientist
- Marguerite Vogt (1913–2007), Cancer biologist
- Ramona Vogt physicist
- Richard Vogt (aircraft designer) (1894–1979), German engineer and aircraft designer
- Richard Vogt (1949–2021), American herpetologist
- Rochus Eugen Vogt (born 1929), German-American physicist
- Steven S. Vogt (born 1949), German American astronomer
- Thorolf Vogt (1888–1958), Norwegian geologist
- William Vogt (1902–1968), American ornithologist and writer on global population issues

=== Medicine ===
- Alfred Vogt (1879–1943), Swiss ophthalmologist
- Cécile Vogt-Mugnier (1875–1962), French neurologist
- Heinrich Vogt (neurologist) (1875–1936), German neurologist
- Oskar Vogt (1870–1959), German neurologist

== Artists, journalists, and writers ==
- A. E. van Vogt (1912–2000), Canadian author
- Carl de Vogt (1885–1970), German actor
- David Vogt (born 1975), German musician and record producer best known as Charles Greywolf
- Doug Vogt, Canadian photojournalist and cameraman
- Günther Vogt (born 1957), Liechtensteiner landscape architect
- Hans Vogt (composer) (1911–1992), German composer and conductor
- Klaus Florian Vogt (born 1970), German tenor
- Lars Vogt (1970–2022), German classical pianist, conductor and teacher
- Linda Vogt (1922–2013), Australian flautist
- Martin Vogt (born 1992), American music producer
- Nils Vogt (comedian) (born 1948), Norwegian comedian
- Nils Vogt (journalist) (1859–1927), Norwegian newspaper editor
- Nils Collett Vogt (1864–1937), Norwegian poet
- Paul Vogt (historian) (born 1952), Liechtenstein politician and historian
- Paul C. Vogt (born 1964), American comedian
- Roy Vogt (1934–1997), Canadian economist and literary critic
- Thomas Heinrich Vogt (1838–1896), German painter and Royal Court photographer during the Wilhelmine Period
- Ulrich Andreas Vogt (born 1952), German tenor and concert hall director

== Sports ==
- Alessandro Vogt (born 2003), Swiss footballer
- Jacqueline Vogt (born 1969), Liechtenstein alpine skier
- Kevin Vogt (born 1991), German footballer
- Miriam Vogt (born 1967), German alpine skier
- Lothar Vogt (born 1952), German chess grandmaster
- Richard Vogt (boxer) (1913–1988), German boxer
- Stephen Vogt (born 1984), American baseball player
- Todd Vogt (born 1974), American Paralympic rower
- Wilko de Vogt, Dutch footballer

== Other ==
- Jens Vogt (1830–1892), Norwegian businessman
- Johan Herman Vogt (1900–1991), Norwegian economist
- John W. Vogt (1920–2010), American military officer
- Paul Vogt (pastor) (1900–1984), Swiss pastor and theologian
- Volrath Vogt (1817–1889), Norwegian theologian
- Von Ogden Vogt (1879–1964) American theologian and author

== See also ==
- Vogt v. Germany
- Funker Vogt, German electronic music project

Similar surnames, possibly of different etymologies
- Vogdt, Vogt, Vogts, Voight/Voigts, Voigt, Voit, Voogd, Voogt/Voogdt/Vooght, van Vugt/Vucht/Vught, Vugts
- Voïta/Voita, Vojta, Vojtěch, Vojtek, Vojtík, Voytek
- Wójcicki/Wóycicki, Wojciechowski, Wójcik/Voitsik, Woit, Woita, Woite, Woith, Woithe, Wójt, Wojta, Wojtala, Wojtas, Wojtasik, Wojtaszek, Wojtkowski, Wojtyła
- Patronymics: Wojtczak, Wojtkowiak, Wojtkiewicz/Vaitkevičius, Wójtowicz, Wojtusiak, Woytak
- From Dutch for "foot": Voet, Voeten
