= Wojta =

Wojta is a surname of Polish and Sorbian origins, It is a short form of the given name Wojciech.A similar Czech name is Vojta. Variant: Woita. Notable people with the surname include:

- Alfred J. Wojta (1909–1959), American agricultural engineer and professor
- Julie Wojta (born 1989), American basketball player
- Rudolph J. Wojta (born 1944), Austrian journalist

== See also ==
Similar surnames, possibly of different etymologies
- Vogdt, Vogt, Vogts, Voight/Voigts, Voigt, Voit, Voogd, Voogt/Voogdt/Vooght, van Vugt/Vucht/Vught, Vugts
- Voïta/Voita, Vojta, Vojtaššák, Vojtěch, Vojtek, Vojtík, Voytek
- Wójcik/Voitsik, Woit, Woita, Woite, Woith, Woithe, Wójt, Wojta, Wojtas
- Patronymics: Wójcicki, Wojciechowski, Wojtkiewicz/Vaitkevičius, Wójtowicz, Woytak
- From Dutch for "foot": Voet, Voeten
