= Van Vugt =

Van Vugt is a Dutch toponymic surname meaning "from Vught". Alternative places of origin are Vucht, now a neighborhood of Breda, or Vucht in Belgian Limburg. Alternative spellings are Van Vucht and Van Vught. People with this name include:

- Frans van Vught, Dutch social scientist
- Henk van Vught (1946–2024), Dutch cyclist
- Jelle Van Vucht
- Jolene Van Vugt (born 1980), Canadian motocross rider
- Kees van Vugt, Dutch rower
- Mark van Vugt (born 1967), Dutch evolutionary psychologist
- Pim van Vugt, Dutch sailor
- Rory van Vugt, NZ rugby union player
- Victor Van Vugt, Australian record producer in New York

== See also ==
Similar surnames, possibly of different etymologies
- Vogdt, Vogt, Vogts, Voight, Voigt, Voit, Voogd, Voogt/Voogdt/Vooght, van Vugt, Vugts
- Vojta, Vojtěch, Vojtek, Voytek
- Wójcicki, Wojciechowski, Wójcik, Woit, Woita, Wójt, Wojtas, Wojtkiewicz/Vaitkevičius, Wójtowicz
- From Dutch for "foot": Voet, Voeten
