= Wójcicki =

Wójcicki /wʊˈtʃɪtski/ wuutch-ITS-kee; Polish pronunciation: [vujˈt͡ɕit͡ski]) is a Polish masculine surname, its feminine counterpart is Wójcicka. The surname may refer to the following notable people:

- Anne Wojcicki (born 1973), American biologist
- Esther Wojcicki (born 1941), American journalist
- Franciszek Wójcicki (1900–1983), Polish politician
- Jakub Wójcicki (born 1988), Polish football defender
- Janina Wójcicka Hoskins (1912–1996), Polish-American librarian
- Katarzyna Bachleda-Curuś née Wójcicka (born 1980), Polish speed skater
- Patrick Wojcicki (born 1991), German boxer
- Roman Wójcicki (born 1958), Polish footballer
- Sara Wojcicki Jimenez (born 1979), American politician
- Stanley Wojcicki (1937–2023), Polish American physicist
- Susan Wojcicki (1968–2024), American businesswoman and former CEO of YouTube.

== See also ==
Similar surnames, possibly of different etymologies
- Vogdt, Vogt, Vogts, Voight/Voigts, Voigt, Voit, Voogd, Voogt/Voogdt/Vooght, van Vugt/Vucht/Vught, Vugts
- Voïta/Voita, Vojta, Vojtaššák, Vojtěch, Vojtek, Vojtík, Voytek
- Wójcik/Voitsik, Woit, Woita, Woite, Woith, Woithe, Wójt, Wojta, Wojtas
- Patronymics: Wójcicki, Wojciechowski, Wojtkiewicz/Vaitkevičius, Wójtowicz, Woytak
- From Dutch for "foot": Voet, Voeten
