= Wójtowicz =

The Polish-language surname Wójtowicz or Wojtowicz may refer to:

- House of Wojtowicz
- John Wojtowicz (1945–2006), American bankrobber
- Tomasz Wójtowicz (volleyball player) (1953–2022), Polish volleyball player
- Tomasz Wójtowicz (footballer) (2003–), Polish football player
- Rudolf Wojtowicz (born 1956), Polish football player
- Agnieszka Wojtowicz-Vosloo (born 1975), Polish-American filmmaker
- Douglas Wojtowicz

== See also ==
Similar surnames, possibly of different etymologies
- Vogdt, Vogt, Vogts, Voight/Voigts, Voigt, Voit, Voogd, Voogt/Voogdt/Vooght, van Vugt/Vucht/Vught, Vugts
- Voïta/Voita, Vojta, Vojtaššák, Vojtěch, Vojtek, Vojtík, Voytek
- Wójcik/Voitsik, Woit, Woita, Woite, Woith, Woithe, Wójt, Wojta, Wojtas
- Patronymics: Wójcicki, Wojciechowski, Wojtkiewicz/Vaitkevičius, Wójtowicz, Woytak
- From Dutch for "foot": Voet, Voeten
