= Wojtkiewicz =

Wojtkiewicz is a Polish-language surname. The Lithuanized form is Vaitkevičius. It may refer to:

- Aleksander Wojtkiewicz (1963–2006), Polish chess grandmaster
- Dennis Wojtkiewicz (born 1956), American painter
- Michał Wojtkiewicz (born 1946), American politician
- Witold Wojtkiewicz (1879–1909), Polish painter

== See also ==
- 4475 Voitkevich

Similar surnames, possibly of different etymologies
- Vogdt, Vogt, Vogts, Voight/Voigts, Voigt, Voit, Voogd, Voogt/Voogdt/Vooght, van Vugt/Vucht/Vught, Vugts
- Voïta/Voita, Vojta, Vojtaššák, Vojtěch, Vojtek, Vojtík, Voytek
- Wójcik/Voitsik, Woit, Woita, Woite, Woith, Woithe, Wójt, Wojta, Wojtas
- Patronymics: Wójcicki, Wojciechowski, Wojtkiewicz/Vaitkevičius, Wójtowicz, Woytak
- From Dutch for "foot": Voet, Voeten
