= Voogt =

Voogt is a Dutch surname. In modern Dutch voogd usually is a guardian of a minor, but as a profession had a much wider meaning in the Middle Ages. Variant forms of the surname are De Voogt ("the guardian"), (de) Voogd, (de) Voogdt, and Vooght. People with this or a variant surname include:

- Alexander de Voogt (born 1970), Dutch psychologist and board game researcher
- Cornelia Claesdr Voogt (1578–?), Dutch mayor's wife portrayed by Frans Hals, sister of Maritge and Willem
- Maritge Claesdr. Voogt (1577–1644), Dutch mayor's wife portrayed by Frans Hals, sister of Cornelia and Willem
- Titus De Voogdt (born 1979), Belgian actor
- Willem Claesz Vooght (1572–1630), Dutch mayor of Haarlem portrayed by Frans Hals, brother of Cornelia and Maritge

== See also ==
Similar surnames, possibly of different etymologies
- Vogdt, Vogt, Vogts, Voight, Voigt, Voit, Voogd, Voogt
- Vojta, Vojtěch, Vojtek, Voytek
- Wójcicki, Wojciechowski, Wójcik, Woit, Woita, Wójt, Wojtas, Wojtkiewicz/Vaitkevičius, Wójtowicz
- From Dutch for "foot": Voet, Voeten
