= Vaitkus =

- Lithuanian surname
- m.: Vaitkus
- f.: (unmarried): Vaitkutė
- f.: (married): Vaitkienė
- Origin: Wojciech

Vaitkus is the masculine form of a Lithuanian family name. Its feminine forms are: Vaitkienė (married woman or widow) and Vaitkutė (unmarried woman). It is derived from the personal name Vaitkus, from Polish Wojciech, which is a diminutive of the Polish given name Wojciech.

The surname may refer to:

- Eduardas Vaitkus (born 1956), Lithuanian doctor, professor and political activist
- Felix Waitkus (1907–1956), American pilot
- Ignas Vaitkus (born 1993), Lithuanian basketball player
- Girmantė Vaitkutė, Lithuanian musician
- Jonas Vaitkus (born 1944), Lithuanian theatre and film director
- Linas Vaitkus (born 1973), American-Lithuanian alpine skier.
- Rimantas Vaitkus (born 1957), Lithuanian politician
- Tomas Vaitkus (born 1982), Lithuanian road racing cyclist
