= Vogdt =

Vogdt is a surname, and may refer to:

- Eberhard Vogdt, Estonian sailor
- Eberhard Vogdt, Estonian sailor

== See also ==
Similar surnames, possibly of different etymologies
- Vogt, Vogts, Voight, Voigt, Voit, Voogd
- Vojta, Vojtěch, Vojtek, Voytek
- Wójcicki, Wojciechowski, Wójcik, Woit, Woita, Wójt, Wojtas, Wojtkiewicz/Vaitkevičius, Wójtowicz
- From Dutch for "foot": Voet, Voeten
