= Jaroslav Malina (anthropologist) =

- Born: 11 April 1945 (age 80); Dolní Bučice near Čáslav
- Citizenship: Czech Republic
- Scientific career
- Institutions: Department of Anthropology of the Faculty of Science of Masaryk University

Jaroslav Malina (born 11 April 1945, in Dolní Bučice near Čáslav, Czech Republic) is a Czech archaeologist, anthropologist, publishing editor, head of the Department (Institute) of Anthropology of the Faculty of Science of Masaryk University, Brno, Czech Republic, and founder and head of Universitas (Masarykiana) Foundation.

== Biography ==
Malina has had a great interest in archaeology and anthropology since childhood. After finishing secondary education he enrolled for a study of archaeology at the Faculty of Arts of Masaryk University, graduating in 1967. In 1969 he performed (with his colleagues) his first archaeological experiment. With this experiment and his consequent work in experimental archaeology he became a founder of this scientific discipline in (former) Czechoslovakia and this discipline also led him to pursuing his goals in anthropology.

== Anthropology ==
=== Leadership ===
Through experimental archaeology Malina came to understand the complexity of human nature and shifted his research and occupational interests to anthropology. In the beginning of the 1990s, together with Jan Beneš and Vladimír Novotný, he co-founded the Department of Anthropology of the Faculty of Science of Masaryk University, which directly picked up on Vojtěch Suk's Anthropological Institute which was, due to ideological reasons, strictly limited and reduced during the years 1948–1989^{1}. Together with his colleagues, Malina strongly supported (and supports) the idea of anthropology as a holistic, integral (biological – social – cultural) scientific disciplines, which studies man from every possible point of view.

After the passing of the first head of the Department Jan Beneš in 1999, Malina became the head of department^{1}.

=== Academic and scientific degrees, duties ===
Malina was awarded the PhD in 1968, and in 1993 he was awarded the degree docent – associate professor of anthropology.

In 1994 Jaroslav Malina was awarded the scientific degree Doctor Scientiae (DrSc.), and in 1995 the academic degree professor of anthropology at the Masaryk University^{2}.

He teaches several courses: Introduction to Anthropology, Anthropology of Ethnicity, Anthropology of Antiquity, Anthropology of Sexuality and others. He also manages the Anthropological Seminar, where invited specialists present the newest or the most interesting concepts or findings in anthropology and related disciplines.

During the years 2001–2009 twelve post-gradual doctoral students graduated under his supervision; currently he supervises fifteen doctoral students and several bachelor and masters-level students.

=== Scientific work and publications ===
In his scientific work Malina deals with the subjects concerning experimental and sociocultural anthropology and archaeology, petroarchaeology and philosophy of science. He has published many scientific studies, essays and books, both in former Czechoslovakia and in the Czech Republic as well as abroad. Among his writings are:

- Archeologie: Jak a proč? ["Archaeology: How and Why"], 1975
- Základy petroarcheologie ["Basics of Petroarchaeology"], 1975 (co-author Jindřich Štelcl)
- Metody experimentu v archeologii ["Methods of Experiment in Archaeology"], 1980
- Archaeology Yesterday and Today, 1990 (in English, co-author Zdeněk Vašíček)
- Kámen a hlína jako ekofakt a artefakt ve vývoji životního prostředí ["Stone and Clay as Ecofact and Artifact in the Development of Environment"], 1991
- První císař ["The First Emperor"], 1994
- Čína z antropologické perspektivy ["China from the Anthropological Perspective"], 2005 (co-author Josef Kolmaš)
- Slovník antropologie občanské společnosti ["Dictionary of Civic Society"], 2006 (co-author Marie Dohnalová)
- Slovník pro studenty antropologie ["Dictionary for the Students of Anthropology"], 2008 (with a team of authors),
- Antropologický slovník (s přihlédnutím k dějinám literatury a umění) aneb co by mohl o člověku vědět každý člověk ["Dictionary of Anthropology (with Respect to the History of Literature and Art)"] 2009, with a team of authors

In 1993 he initiated an extensive scientific and artistic project to produce a book in five volumes and an associated exhibition titled Kruh prstenu: Světové dějiny sexuality, erotiky a lásky od počátků do současnosti v reálném životě, krásné literatuře, výtvarném umění a dílech českých malířů a sochařů inspirovaných obsahem této knihy ["The Circle of the Ring: The World History of Sexuality, Eroticism and Love from the Beginnings up to the Present Day in Real Life, Belle-Lettres, Visual Art and in the Works of Czech Painters and Sculptors Inspired by the Content of this Book"]. After the preprints of the four volumes published in 1999–2003 the work started to be published in its final form in 2007. In 2000 the long-time scientific and educational project Panoráma biologické a sociokulturní antropologie: Modulové učební texty pro studenty antropologie a "příbuzných" oborů ["Panorama of Biological and Sociocultural Anthropology: Module Textbooks for Students of Anthropology and Related Specialisations"] in the framework of which and under his editorial leadership with the contributions of many significant specialists 40 volumes were published.

He also edited scientific-educational books going back to the mysteries of the distant past and human creativity:

- Vzpomínky na minulost aneb Experimenty odhalují tajemství pravěku ["Memories of the Past or Experiments Reveal the Secrets of Prehistory"], 1982, 1992
- Zasáhli mimozemšťané a katastrofy do vývoje lidstva? ["Did the Extraterrestrials and Disasters Affect the Evolution of Mankind?"], 1988
- Obdivuhodný člověk: Úvahy o lidské tvořivosti ["The Admirable Man: Reflections on Human Creativity"], 1991
- Dvacet nejvýznamnějších archeologických objevů dvacátého století ["The Twenty Most Significant 20th-Century Archaeological Discoveries"], 1991
- Jak vznikly největší monumenty dávnověku ["How the Biggest Monuments of Prehistory Arose"], 1994 (co-author Pavel Pavel)
- Adolf Born, 1995 (with a team of authors)
- Olbram Zoubek, 1996 (with a team of authors)
- Alois Mikulka, 2001
- Vincenc Makovský, 2002 (with Jiří Hlušička and Jiří Šebek)
- Vladimír Preclík, 2002 (with a team of authors)
- Zdeněk Macháček, 2005 (co-author Nina Dvořáková)
- Nadace Universitas Masarykiana: 1993–2004 ["Universitas Masarykiana Foundation: 1993-2004"]: 2005
- Bohumír Matal, 2006 (co-authors Ludvík Kundera and Kateřina Svobodová)
- Erotikon sochaře Zdeňka Macháčka ["Sculptor Zdeněk Macháček and his Eroticon"], 2008 (co-author Jaroslav Zvěřina)
- Vladimír Svoboda, 2008 (co-author Nina Dvořáková)

His scientific and educational monographs (30) were published both in this country and abroad (Academia, Cambridge University Press, Editura Artemis, Electa, Mysl', Progress etc.) in the total printing of more than half a million copies.

== Works of fiction ==
He also penetrated beyond the borders of scientific and educational activity and entered the field of fiction:

- Amor: Počítačový systém k automatickému generování milostných scén ["Amor: The Computer System for the Automatic Generation of Love Scenes'], 1993
- První pozemšťan ["The First Terrestrial"], 1995
- Světová katastrofa a jiné povídky s neblahým koncem ["The World Disaster and Other Stories with an Ominous End"], 1996
- Smrt profesora a jiné příběhy z univerzitního prostředí ["The Death of a Professor and other Stories from the University Environment"], 1997

== Philanthropy, fine arts ==
In 1993 he co-founded the Universitas Masarykiana Foundation (currently Universitas Foundation), became its president^{4} and also president of the Karel Engliš Prize Committee and that of the Universitas Masarykiana Foundation Prize Committee. The Foundation supports the following six foundation editorial lines^{5}, which Malina founded and serves as an editor:

- Beletrie (Fiction)
- Heureka
- Miscellanea
- Osobnosti (Personalities)
- Scientia
- Scintilla

The Universitas Masarykiana Foundation, working in this framework, has produced more than sixty volumes. Within these editions not only accomplished authors can publish, it also gives an opportunity to starting authors, works on the history of fine arts and other publications which otherwise would otherwise not have a chance to be published.

== Awards and acknowledgements ==
Malina was awarded the Rector of Masaryk University Prize for the outstanding scientific work (1995, 1997), the City of Brno Prize (1997), 3rd prize and Recognition of Honor at the 18th book fair Libri in Olomouc for the books Vladimír Preclík a Vincenc Makovský (2003), The CERM Academic Publishing House Prize for the book of the year – První císař: Tvůrce Číny a osmého divu světa (2005) and Kruh prstenu (2008), professor Josef Hynie Prize for the best publication in the scientific discipline in the year 2007 (2008) and others.

== Memberships ==
Malina is a member of several academic and institutional commissions (including habilitation and professorate commissions) for biology and anthropology at the Faculty of Science, Masaryk University^{3}. He is also a member of domestic and international panels and institutions (Scientific council of the Prague National Gallery, Scientific council of the Faculty of Science, Masaryk University, The Society for Support of University Activities in Brno and Prague etc.).
