= Hoet =

Hoet is a surname. Notable people with the surname include:

- Gerard Hoet (1648–1733), Dutch Golden Age painter and engraver
- Griet Hoet (born 1978), Belgian para-cyclist
- Jan Hoet (1936–2014), Belgian founder of SMAK

== Chemistry ==
- Ethanol, a simple alcohol sometimes abbreviated as HOEt

== See also ==
- Voet
