= Wójcik =

Wójcik, Wojczik, Wojczyk, Wojszyk (also variants of phonetic spelling: Woicik, Woycik, Woyczik, Woytik, etc.) is one of the oldest Polish surnames, and the fourth most common in Poland (100,064 in 2009). In January 2026, the Polish register PESEL listed 48,568 women and 47,734 men with the surname.

Archaic feminine forms (still used colloquially) are derived by adding suffixes: -owa (after husband) and -ówna after father.

There are several suggested origins of the surname: diminutive from the occupation of wójt or from the given name Wojciech. It may also be a nickname by the bird wójcik (greenish warbler).

Over the centuries, from many dialects arose multiple spellings for the Wójcik surname, including Woichik, Wojczyk, Woyzeck, Wojszyk, Wujcik, etc.

== History ==
Early record of the Wójcik surname may be found in the Chronicles of Little Poland (13th century). The knight Wójcik was a companion of King Wladyslaw of Poland and a member of his bodyguard. According to medieval Łęczyca Court Files (14th century), in 1395, Michno Wójcik of Wójciki pursued legal action against City of Łęczyca to take back part of his estate that was illegally annexed during his absence.

Noble families named Wójcik bear different coats of arms:

- Wójcik of Bialynia
- Wójcik and Wojczyk of Pobog
- Wójcik and Wójcikowski of Korab
- Wójcik of German origin: Silver, an eagle black, crowned gold.
- de Wojcza, Wojczik and Wojszyk of Ogończyk
- Wójcik and Wójsik of Ostoja
- Wojszyk of Szeliga
- Wojszek and Wójszyk of Łodzia
- Wójcik of Lubicz
- Wójcik of Rola
- Wojsik and Wojszik of Łabędź
- Wojszek and Wojszik of Piława
- Wójsik and Wojszyk of Janina
- In the 17th century appeared the family Wójcikiewicz (derived from family Wójcik) of the Bialynia coat of arms
- Wójcikowski of the Nałęcz coat of arms.

However, most families bearing the surnames Wójcik, Wójczyk, Wojszik, etc. (c. 90%) are derived from peasantry or burghers, as a result of popular adoptions of this surname between the 17th and 19th centuries. These families derived their surname from the named office of wójt or the first name Wojciech: son of Wojciech is also Wojcik.

== People ==
=== Wójcik ===
- Adam Wójcik (1970–2017), Polish basketball player
- Aleksandra Wójcik, multiple people
- Andżelika Wójcik (born 1996), Polish speed skater
- Dave Wojcik (born 1968), American college basketball coach
- Denis Wojcik, American author
- Doug Wojcik (born 1964), American college basketball coach and former player
- Elżbieta Wójcik (born 1996), Polish boxer
- Greg Wojcik (1946–2005), American football player
- Janusz Wójcik (1953–2017), Polish politician and former footballer and coach
- Jerzy Wójcik, multiple people
- John Wojcik (born 1942), American baseball player
- Jolanta Wójcik (born 1984), Polish athlete
- Katarzyna Wójcik (born 1983), Polish modern pentathlete
- Kathleen Wojcik (born 1936), American businesswoman and politician
- Krzysztof Wójcik (disambiguation), several people
- Łukasz Wójcik, Polish glider pilot
- Magdalena Wójcik (born 1975), Polish singer, member of the band Goya
- Marcin Wójcik (born 1989), Polish mixed martial artist
- Marek Wójcik (born 1980), Polish politician
- Michał Wójcik (born 1971), Polish politician
- Natalie Wojcik (born 1999), American former artistic gymnast
- Pamela Robertson Wojcik, American film scholar and academic
- Piotr Wójcik (born 1965), Polish athlete
- Piotr Wójcik, (born 1967), Polish photojournalist
- Rafał Wójcik (1972–2025), Polish long-distance runner
- Ryszard Wójcik (born 1956), Polish football referee
- Stanisław Wójcik (1904–1981), Polish footballer
- Tomasz Wójcik (born 1963), Polish physicist
- Wacław Wójcik (1919–1997), Polish cyclist
- Wiesław Wójcik (1946–2021), Polish theater, film and television actor
- Wojciech Wojcik (born 1992), Polish footballer
- Ludvika Sivickaja-Vojcik

=== Wujcik ===
- Erick Wujcik (1951–2008), American role-playing game designer
- Theo Wujcik (1936–2014), American artist

=== Woitzik ===
- Gerhard Woitzik (1927–2023), German politician

== See also ==
- Wojciech
- Wójcik-Fryszerka, a settlement in central Poland
- Woyzeck (disambiguation)
- Wozzeck (disambiguation)

Similar surnames, possibly of different etymologies
- Vogt, Vogts, Voight, Voigt, Voit, Voogd
- Vojta, Vojtěch, Vojtek, Voytek
- Woit, Wójcik, Wójt, Wojtas, Wójcicki, Wojciechowski, Wojtkiewicz/Vaitkevičius, Wójtowicz
- From Dutch for "foot": Voet, Voeten
