= Vojta =

Vojta (feminine: Vojtová) is a Czech surname. It is a pet name of the given name Vojtěch. Notable people with the surname include:

- Andreas Vojta (born 1989), Austrian distance runner
- Jakub Vojta (footballer) (born 1991), Czech footballer
- Jakub Vojta (ice hockey) (born 1987), Czech ice hockey player
- Jan Ignác František Vojta (c. 1657 – 1701), Czech composer
- Jaroslav Vojta (1888–1970), Czech film actor
- Josef Vojta (1935–2023), Czech footballer
- Linda Vojtová (born 1985), Czech model
- Matyáš Vojta (born 2004), Czech footballer
- Paul Vojta (born 1957), American mathematician
- Přemysl Vojta (born 1983), Czech horn player
- Rudolf Vojta (1912–1984), Austrian ice hockey player
- Václav Vojta (1917–2000), Czech doctor
- Veronika Vojtová (born 1990), Czech slalom canoeist

== See also ==
Similar surnames, possibly of different etymologies
- Vogdt, Vogt, Vogts, Voight/Voigts, Voigt, Voit, Voogd, Voogt/Voogdt/Vooght, van Vugt/Vucht/Vught, Vugts
- Vojta, Vojtěch, Vojtek, Voytek
- Wójcicki, Wojciechowski, Wójcik, Woit, Woita, Wójt, Wojtas, Wojtkiewicz/Vaitkevičius, Wójtowicz
- From Dutch for "foot": Voet, Voeten
