= Voytsekhovsky =

Voytsekhovsky, feminine: Voytsekhovskaya is a Russian-language surname, a form mof the Polish surname Wojciechowski. Another variant is Voytekhovsky/Voytekhovskaya. Notable people with the surname include:

- Bogdan Voitsekhovsky
- Nikolay Voytsekhovsky (1833–1877), State Councillor in the Russian Empire
- Oleksei Voytsekhovsky
- Sergey Voytsekhovsky

== See also ==
- Gerda Voitechovskaja, Lithuanian badminton player
