= Wojciech Buliński =

Polish architect and professor (1929–2021)

Wojciech Włodzimierz Buliński
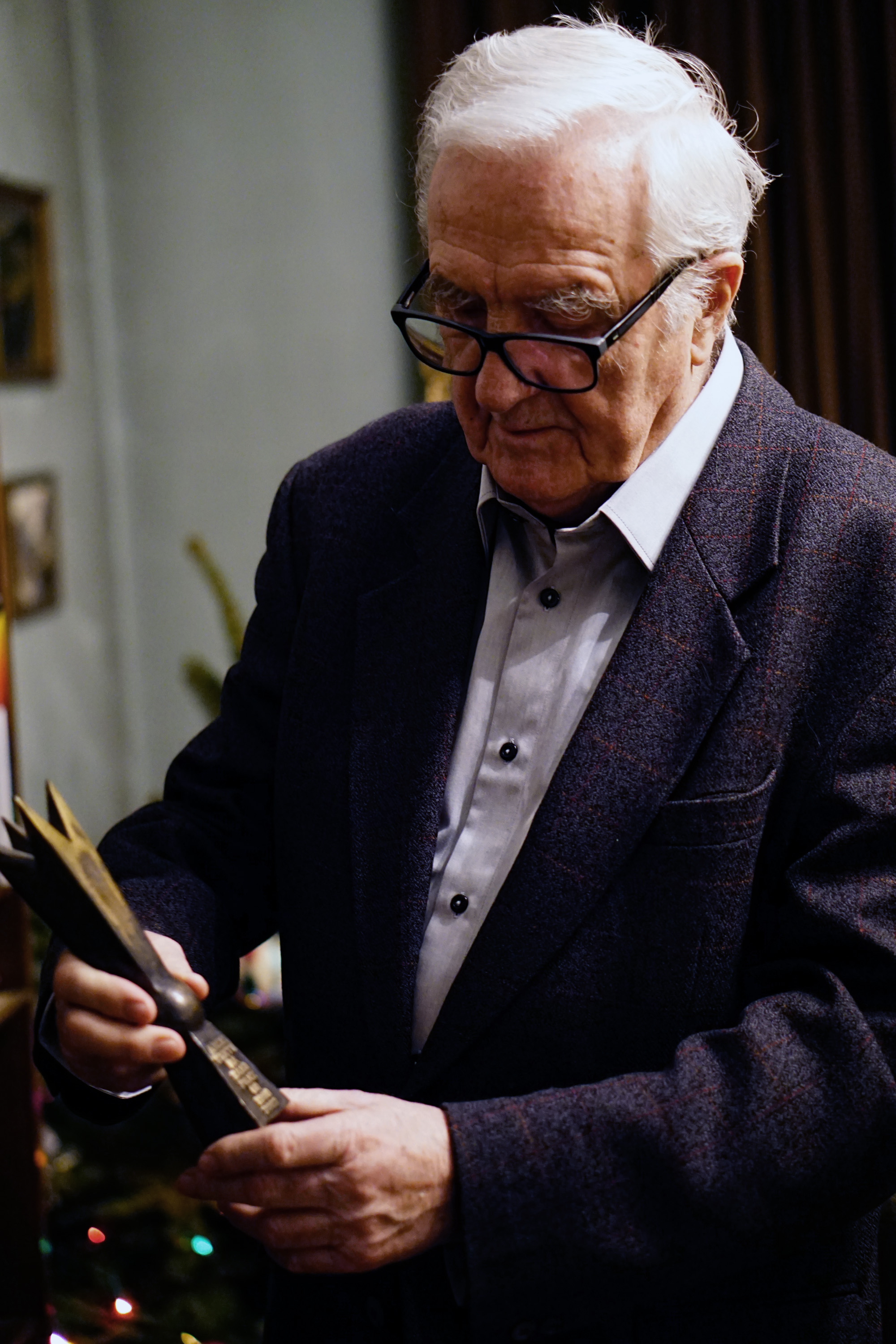
- Buliński in 2018
- Born: 13 November 1929
- Died: 24 November 2021 (aged 92)
- Occupation: Architect

Wojciech Włodzimierz Buliński (13 November 1929 - 24 November 2021) was a Polish architect and professor who was dean of the Faculty of Architecture at Tadeusz Kościuszko University of Technology from 1987 to 1993. He is noted as among the first architects in Poland to begin designing in the modernist style after the 'thaw' and decline of socialist realism which followed the death of Joseph Stalin and Bolesław Bierut.

Buliński designed the Biprocemwap office building in Kraków from 1958 to 1960, with it being completed in 1963. It is described as heavily influenced by the work of Le Corbusier, and seen as the closest embodiment of Corbusier's themes in the modernist architecture being produced in Poland at the time.

From 1971 to 1972, Buliński designed the Centre of Preventative Medicine with Ludwik Konior. Construction on the building was finished in 1974, but it was left unused for several years. He also designed the building of the Faculty of Materials Science and Ceramics at the AGH University of Science and Technology.

In 2001, Buliński was awarded the Officer's Cross of the Order of Polonia Restituta. In 2013, he was a recipient of the Housing Environment 'Bene Merentibus' Medal for "outstanding merits in shaping urban architectural spaces and many years' teaching and scientific activities in Poland and on the international arena".

== Gallery ==
Buildings by Buliński
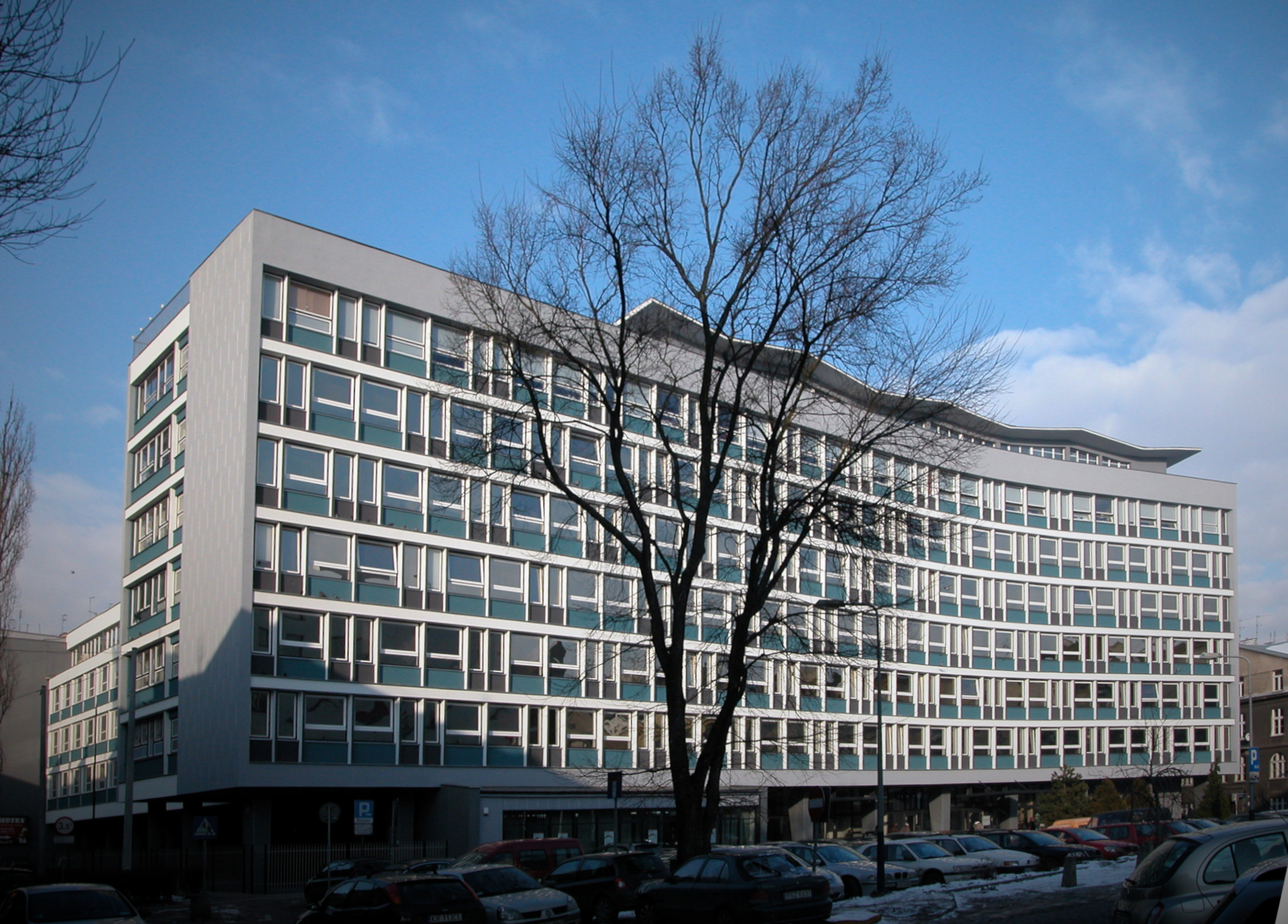
The Biprocemwap building

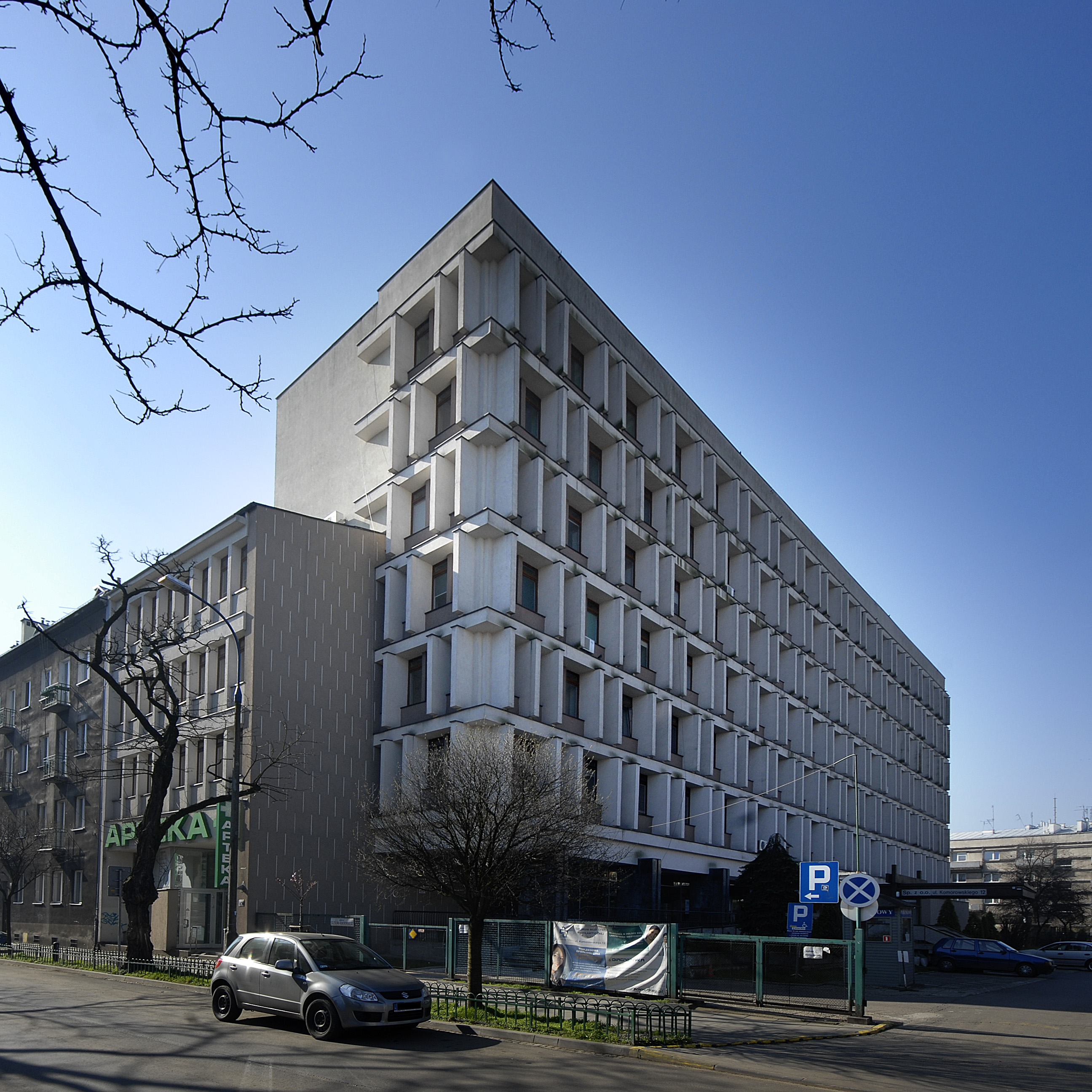
The Centre of Preventative Medicine

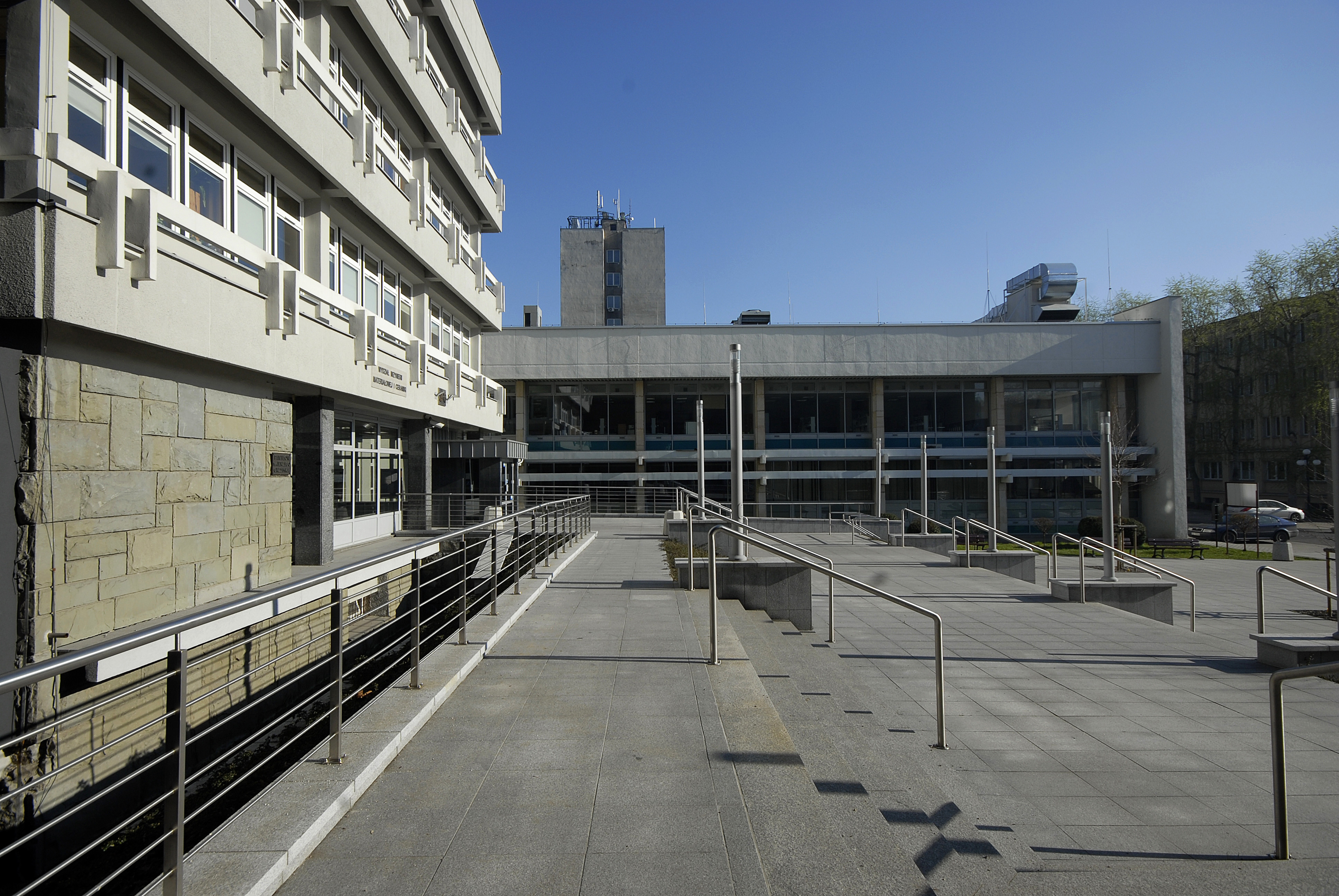
The Faculty of Materials Science and Ceramics
