= Daiva Vaitkevičienė-Astramskaitė =

Lithuanian folklorist (born 1969)

Daiva Vaitkevičienė-Astramskaitė (born 1969, Panevėžys District, Lithuania) is a Lithuanian folklorist, Senior Researcher, Department of Oral Folklore of the Institute of Lithuanian Literature and Folklore.

During 1987-1992 she studied Lithuanistics at the Vilnius University. Since 1991 she works at the Lithuanian Institute of Literature and Folklore. Her main interests are in Lithuanian mythology In 1999 she earned Ph.D. in humanitarian sciences, thesis Ugnies raiškos lietuvių ir latvių mitologijoje [Fire Expressions in Lithuanian and Latvian Mythology].

Member of the editorial board of Incantacio: An International Journal on Charms, Charmers and Charming.

She also teaches at the Vilnius University and is a member of the editorial team of its journal Semiotika.

== Books ==
- 2019: Žydinti taurė: alus ir midus baltų kultūroje [Flowering Mug: Beer and Mead in Baltic Culture]
- 2011: (with Vykintas Vaitkevičius) Lietuva: 101 legendinė vieta [Lithuania: 101 Legendary Places]
- 2008: Lietuvių užkalbėjimai: gydymo formulės [Lithuanian Incantations: Healing Formulas] ISBN 9789955698944—over 1,700 texts of Lithuanian healing incantations, with English translations, for a wider audience
- 2001: Ugnies metaforos: lietuvių ir latvių mitologijos studija [Fire Metaphors: A Study in Lithuanian and Latvian Mythology ]
- 1998: (prepared together with J. Ūsaitytė) Lietuvių liaudies dainynas [Lithuanian Folk Songs], vol. XIV: Šeimos dainos [Family Songs], book 3, ISBN 9986-513-07-3
