= Vykintas Vaitkevičius =

Lithuanian archaeologist

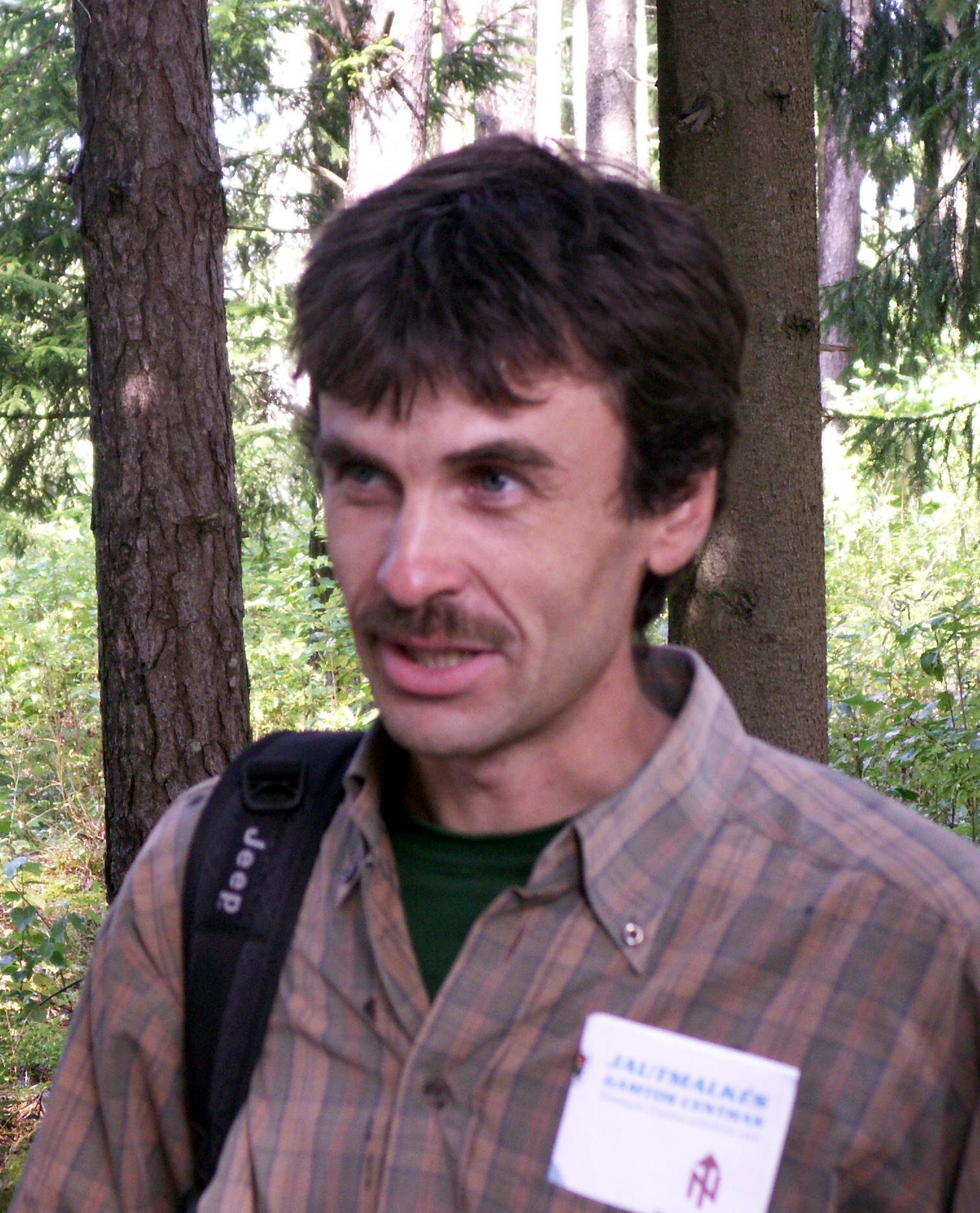

Vykintas Vaitkevičius is a Lithuanian archaeologist.

Vaitkevičius graduated from the Vilnius University (1996: B.S. history, specialty archaeology; 1998: M.S. history, specialty archaeology; 2000: doctorate in humanities)

His research interests include Baltic and ancient Lithuanian religion, comprehensive studies of Lithuania and Belarus, and digitization of cultural heritage.

Since 2010 he is Vilnius University. As of 2014 he is project leader at the museology chair, Department of Communication.

He is noted for popularization of the archaeology in the society. In particular, since 2002 he is an active organizer of the "Professor Marija Gimbutas Readings" co-organized by the National Museum of Lithuania and the Archaeological Society of Lithiuania. Since 2006 he is deputy chair of the Archaeological Society of Lithiuania.

During 2001-2002 he was member of the state commission in archaeology at Seimas (Lithuanian parliament). During 2005-2010 he was on the Immovable Cultural Heritage Review Board of the Department of Cultural Heritage.

In 2011 he was recipient of the State Jonas Basanavičius Award for comprehensive research in ethnic Lithuanian lands.

Other awards include "Archaeologist of the Year" (2008) and recipient of the Baltoji gimtis ("Born Balt") award (2006).

== Books ==
- Senosios Lietuvos šventvietės. Žemaitija, Vilnius: Diemedis, 1998, ISBN 9986-23-037-3
- Alkai: baltų šventviečių studija, Vilnius: Diemedis, 2003 m. ISBN 9986-23-113-2
- Studies into the Balts’ Sacred Places, Oxford: J. & E. Hedges Ltd, 2004 (British Archaeological Reports. International Series, vol. 1228)
- Senosios Lietuvos šventvietės. Aukštaitija, Vilnius: Diemedis, 2006 m. ISBN 9986-23-132-9.
- Neris. 2007 metų ekspedicija. Pirma knyga, Vilnius: Mintis, 2010, ISBN 978-5417-00-999-0

=== Co-authored ===
- Ar tikrai Raigardas prasmego? Kompleksinių tyrimų duomenys, Vilnius: VDA leidykla, 2001, ISBN 9986-571-65-0
- Merkinės istorijos bruožai, Vilnius: Lietuvos istorijos instituto leidykla, 2004, ISBN 9986-780-57-8
- (with Valentinas Baltrūnas), Lietuva. 101 įdomiausia vieta. Vilnius: Alma littera, 2008 m., 2010 m. ISBN 9789955381570
- (with Daiva Vaitkevičienė) Lietuva. 101 legendinė vieta, Vilnius: Alma littera, 2011 m. ISBN 9789955389200
