= Rimantas Vaitkus =

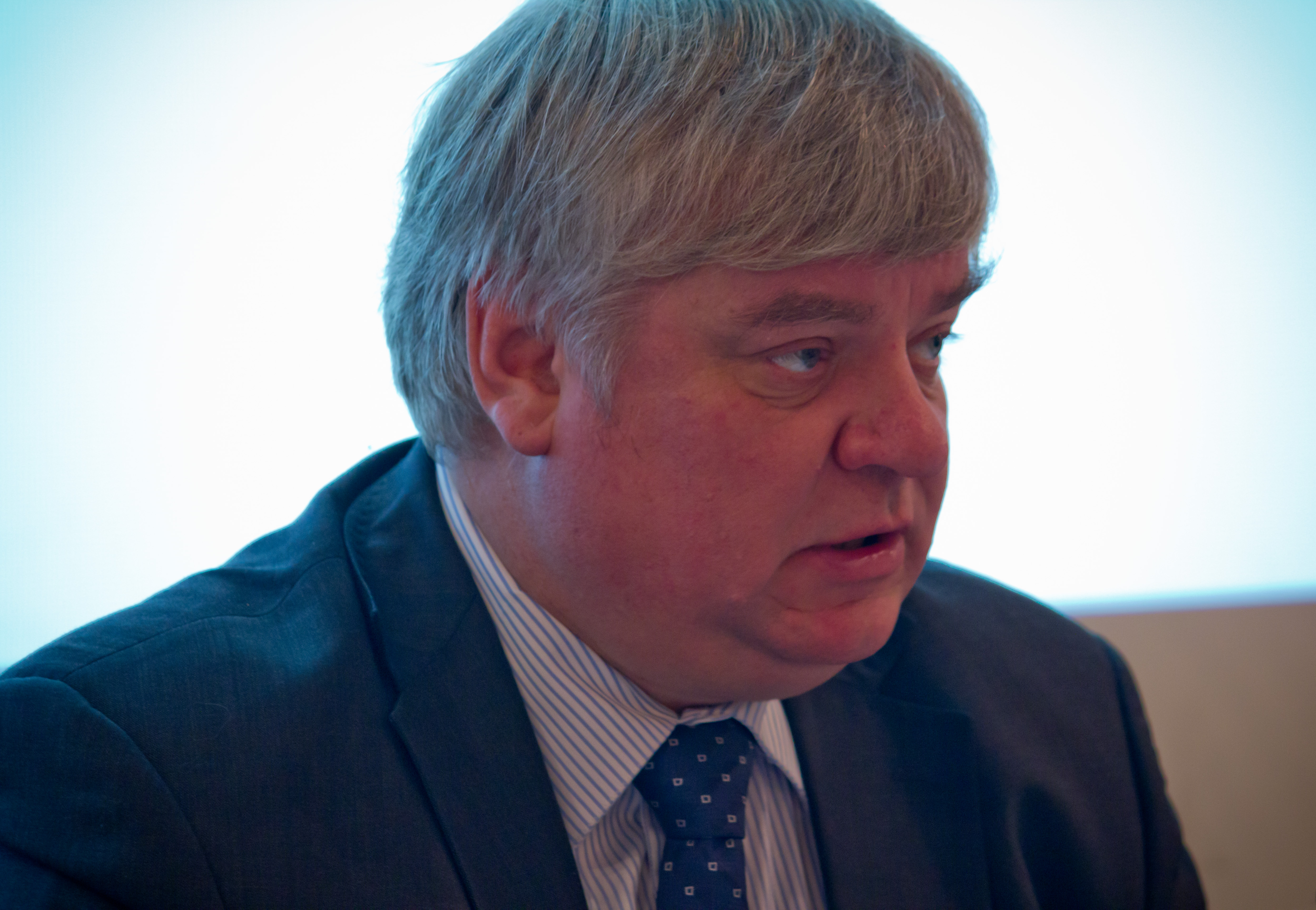

Rimantas Vaitkus is the First Deputy Chancellor of the Government of Lithuania.
