= Wozzeck (disambiguation) =

Wozzeck is a 1925 opera by Alban Berg, based on the play Woyzeck by Georg Büchner.

Wozzeck may also refer to:

- Wozzeck (Gurlitt), a 1926 opera by Manfred Gurlitt, also based on the Büchner play
- Wozzeck (film), a 1947 German film adaptation of the Büchner play
- Wozzeck, a 1970 TV film adaptation of the Berg opera, starring Toni Blankenheim in the title role

== See also ==
- Woyzeck (disambiguation)
