= Klaus Urbons =

German photographer and printmaker (born 1952)

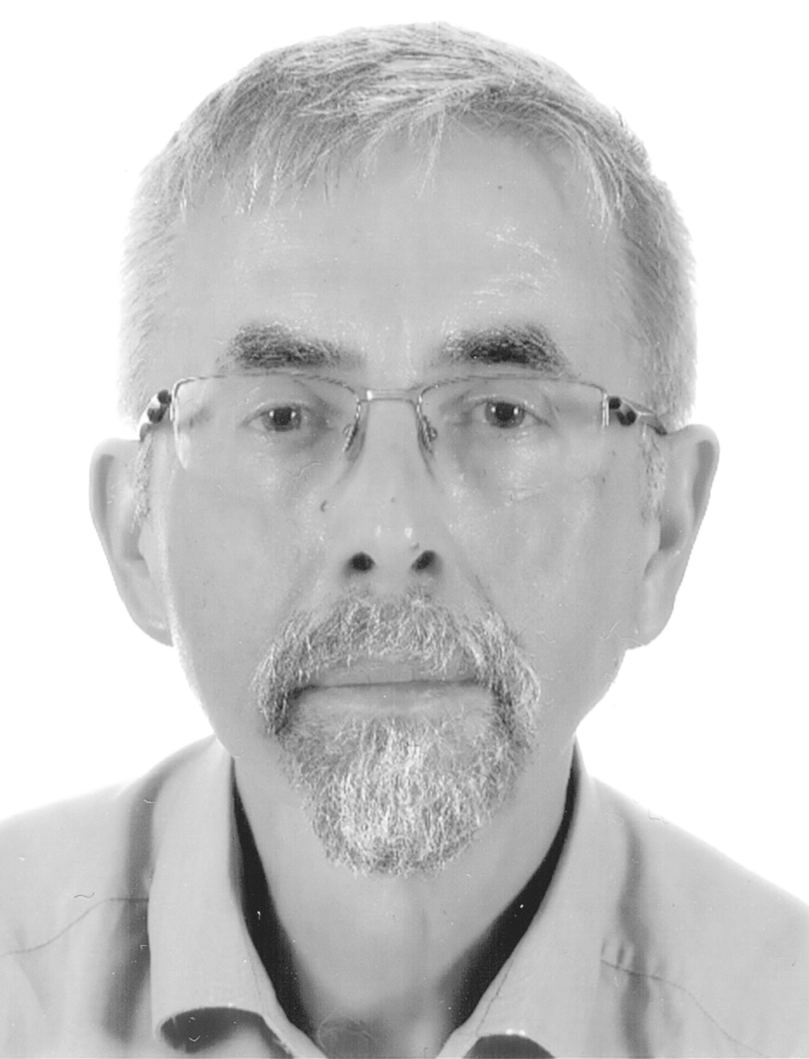
- Born: 30 September 1952 (age 74); Göhren, Rügen, Germany
- Education: Hochschule Düsseldorf
- Known for: Photography, printmaking
- Notable work: Museum für Fotokopie, "Makroscope" art centre
- Movement: Xerography, xerox art, fine-art photography, conceptual photography
- Awards: Ruhrpreis für Kunst und Wissenschaft; 2017
- Website: http://www.urbons.de

Klaus Urbons (Göhren on Rügen, 1952) is a German photographer and xerography printmaker. He is a pioneer and leading figure of copy art in Germany. He founded the Museum für Fotokopie, and is the author and translator of books on the history of Copy Art and photocopiers, as well as a curator and a collector.

== Biography ==
After completing secondary school, Urbons did an apprenticeship as a typographer. At the same time he studied visual communication and art history at the Hochschule Düsseldorf.

In 1976, he co-founded the first artist's gallery and picture lending library in Mülheim an der Ruhr, called "Atelier i.d. Altstadt".

In December 1977, the first artistic works with copiers were produced and displayed. In the following years, two other artist's galleries evolved from this first project: the "Panoptikum" (1978–1980) and the "Holoskop" (1980–1984).

Since 1980, Urbons has been self-employed as an author, graphic-designer, curator, and artist and has been researching on the history, technology and art of photocopying, electrography and digital media. He is one of the major experts in this field worldwide.

In 1984 the international exhibition project, curated by Urbons, "Art Shelter — Kunstschutzkeller", took place. It has been a 1 year long project that involved a large group of international artists.

In March 1985 Klas Urbons founded the "Museum für Fotokopie" in Mülheim an der Ruhr, an international forum for technology and Art produced with photocopiers. The Museum built up one of the most important collection of Art in this field, covering the technological and artistic history of modern photocopying Art. More than 20 exhibitions of Copy Art produced by artists from Germany and abroad have been organized by the Museum as well as competitions and workshops. The Museum also collected several devices from the very early stages of this printing technique in the 1950s: in Germany called Blitzkopie and in the USA called xerography. The collection of about 100 copying machines and consumables, technical library & documentation as well as a prospectus collection (since 1950) is hosted by the German Museum of Technology (Berlin) in 1999.

In 2013, Urbons co-founded the "Makroscope: Centre for Art and Technology" in Mülheim.

In 2017, Klaus Urbons was awarded the Prize Ruhrpreis für Kunst und Wissenschaft.

== Exhibitions and Projects ==
- 1988: Member of the jury for "2. Biennale für Copy Art and Electrografie" in Valencia, Spain
- 1990: Speech on the developments in "Copier Art & Technology" on the opening of the "MIDE — Museo Internacional de Electrografia" in Cuenca, Spain
- 1991: Workshop on the artistic use of the first Xerox copier with students of the University of Castilla-La Mancha in Cuenca
- 1992: Exhibition "Trivial Machines 1 — Electrografie" at Karl Ernst Osthaus-Museum, Hagen (Conception & Co-Curator)
- 1997—1998: Participation in the "Kopieren met de K van Kunst" project at the museum Scryption Museum, Tilburg, Netherlands
- 2004: Conception of the BlackBox project, a hiking exhibition on the photocopy
- 2007—2008: Participation in the exhibition "Kunst, Zukunft, Ruhrgebient" in the Science Park Gelsenkirchen (curator Dr. H. Stevenson)
- 2008: "Copy Copy — 70 jahre trocken Kopieren", an event of the BlackBox project in the Mülheimer Büromuseum (October 13–23) with the first demonstrations of the Astoria experiment (invention of xerography) by Chester F. Carlson and his assistant Ing Otto Kornei in 1938.
- 2009: Presentation of the first Xerographic book copier from 1950 as well as the Astoria experiment at the Xerox Innovation Session, Neuss
- 2009: "Body & Copy" International Copy Art Exhibition by Silvio de Garcia
- 2010: Copy Art-Workshop in Art Teaching, Realschule Broich, Mülheim and FH Design in Offenbach with students of Prof. Andreas Lobe
- 2011: Conception of the cultural history exhibition "Copia"
- 2012: Workshop on the Astoria experiment with the visitors of the world's largest computer museum, the Heinz Nixdorf MuseumsForum in Paderborn
- 2012: Workshop on Copy Art with the analogue copier in Shiny Toys-Space, Moers and exhibition. Lecture & demo at the Shiny Toys-Festival in Mülheim
- 2013: Participation in the project "PNEUMAtic circUS" by Vittore Baroni and OCTO for the Transmediale Festival in Berlin and the Shiny Toys Festival
- 2014: Participation in the exhibition "Der subversive Geist" within the framework of the Ruhr art scene, among others. with a documentation of the "Art Shelter 1984"
- 2016: Curator of the exhibition "Pictures in Minutes" | "Minutenbilder" in the Makroscope Centre for Art and Technology in Mülheim

== Publications ==
- Kopieren heute : d. Geschichte d. Fotokopie u. ihre heutige Anwendung für d. moderne Büro, 1988. Co-author.
- Copy art : Kunst und Design mit dem Fotokopierer, 1991. (With the 2nd extended edition in 1993; and the Hungarian translation in 2005, Budapest.)
- Elektrografie : analoge und digitale Bilder 1994. With contributions by international artists.
- Chester F. Carlson und die Xerografie, 2008. Containing the first biography of the inventor in the German language. Was published on the occasion of the exhibition "Copy Copy – 70 Jahre trocken Kopieren".
- Edith Weyde – How an inventor from the Rhine-Land changed the world, 2016. Co-authors: Klaus Urbons, José Ramón Alcalá, Susanne Dickel, Gert Koshofer, Rolf Sachsse, Edith Weyde. Bi-lingual German/English. Published on the occasion of the exhibition "Minutenbilder/Pictures in Minutes".
