= Aleksandra Wójcik =

Aleksandra Wójcik or Alexandra Wojcik may refer to:

- Aleksandra Wójcik (volleyball) (born 1994), Polish volleyball player
- Alexandra Wójcik (gymnast) (born 1985), Polish rhythmic gymnast
