= G. Mark Voit =

G. Mark Voit (born 1961) is an American physicist and professor in the Department of Physics and Astronomy at Michigan State University. His most cited solely-authored paper is "Tracing Cosmic Evolution with Clusters of Galaxies", in Reviews of Modern Physics, at Michigan State University. He is an Elected Fellow of the American Association for the Advancement of Science. His research involves theoretical investigations of clusters of galaxies, galaxy evolution, and the role of supermassive black holes in galaxy evolution. Voit is an expert in the physics of astrophysical gas and dust.

== Education and career ==
Voit graduated in astrophysical sciences from Princeton University in 1983, and completed his PhD in astrophysics from the University of Colorado Boulder in 1990 under the supervision of J. Michael Shull. After postdoctoral research at the California Institute of Technology he was a Hubble Fellow at the Johns Hopkins University for a second postdoctoral appointment in 1993. He was a member of the scientific staff at the Space Telescope Science Institute in Baltimore, MD in 1995 until joining the Michigan State faculty in 2003.

== Books ==
He is a co-author of three books in the Pearson Cosmic Perspective Series of astronomy textbooks: The Cosmic Perspective (8th ed., 2016, also published as two separate volumes), The Essential Cosmic Perspective (7th ed., 2014), and The Cosmic Perspective Fundamentals (2nd ed., 2015).
