= Martin Vojtek =

Czech ice hockey player

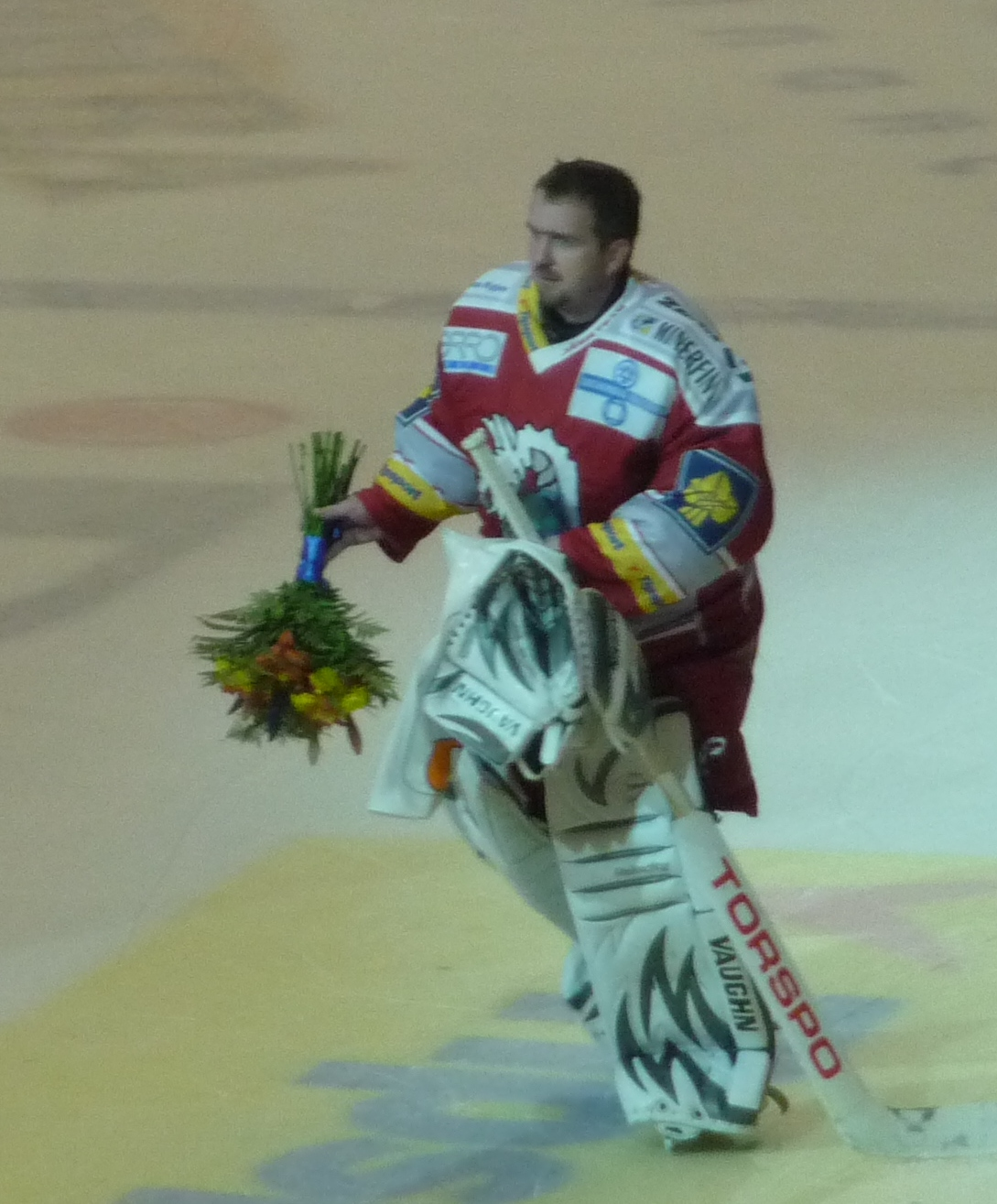
- PSG Zlín v HC Oceláři Třinec 2010-10-01
- Born: May 4, 1975 (age 49); Přerov, Czechoslovakia
- Height: 5 ft 11 in (180 cm)
- Weight: 207 lb (94 kg; 14 st 11 lb)
- Position: Goaltender
- Catches: Left
- Czech Extraliga team: HC Oceláři Třinec
- Playing career: 2000–present

Martin Vojtek (born May 4, 1975) is a retired Czech professional ice hockey goaltender. He played with HC Oceláři Třinec in the Czech Extraliga during the 2010–11 Czech Extraliga season.
