= Christopher Vogt =

German politician (born 1984)

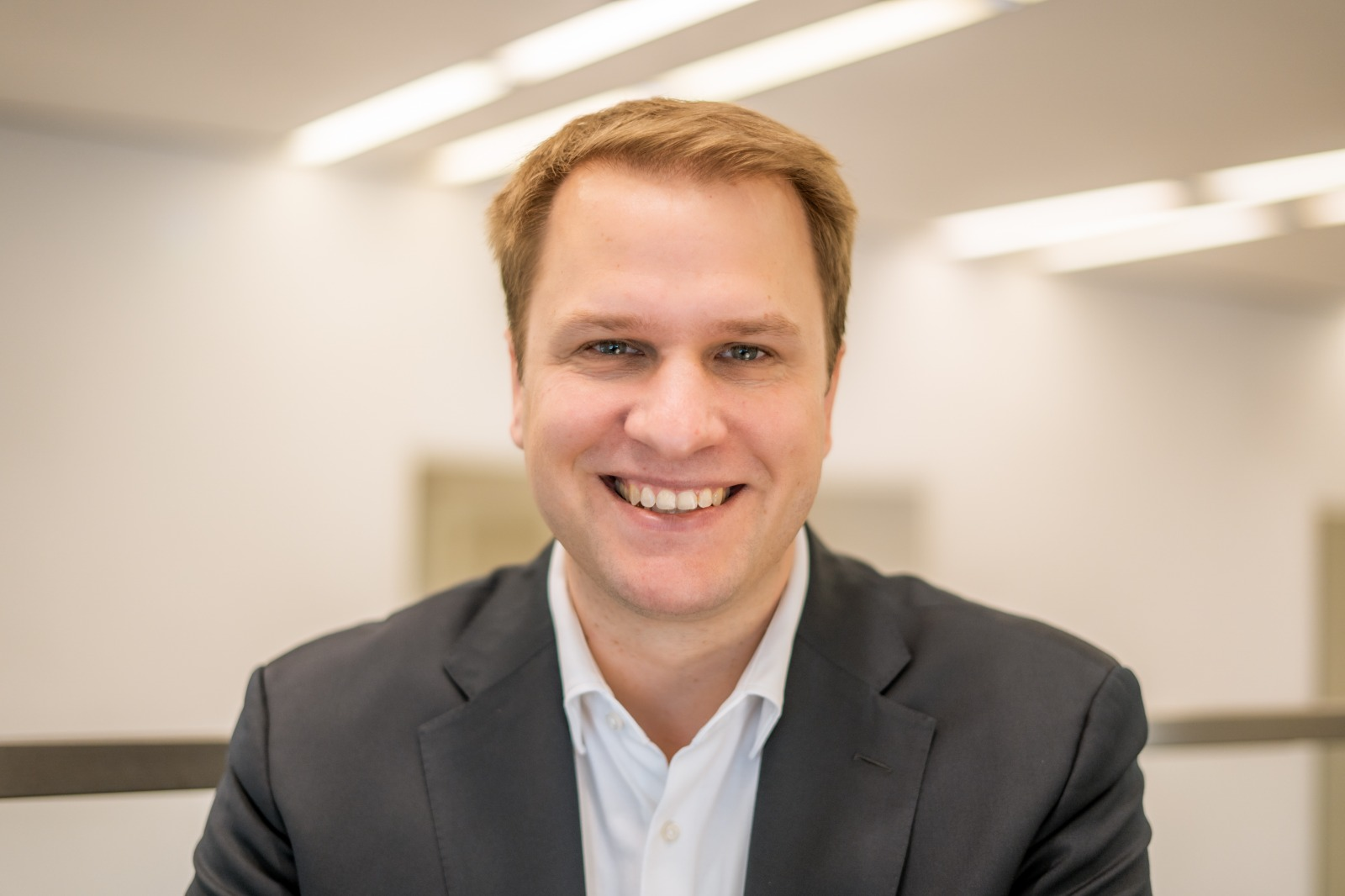
- Vogt in 2024

Member of the Landtag of Schleswig-Holstein
- Incumbent
- Assumed office 27 October 2009

Personal details
- Born: 4 January 1984 (age 42)
- Party: Free Democratic Party (since 2001)

Christopher Vogt (born 4 January 1984) is a German politician serving as a member of the Landtag of Schleswig-Holstein since 2009. He has served as group leader of the Free Democratic Party since 2017, and as state president of the party since 2024.
