= Krzysztof Wójcik =

Krzysztof Wójcik may refer to:

- Krzysztof Wójcik (politician) (born 1958), Polish politician
- Krzysztof Wójcik (volleyball) (born 1960), retired Polish volleyball player
