= Henk van Vught =

Dutch cyclist (1946–2024)

Personal information
- Born: 10 December 1946 Boxtel, the Netherlands
- Died: 13 February 2024 (aged 77)

Cycling career
- Sport: Cycling
- Discipline: Road
- Role: Rider

Amateur team
- Caballero

Henk van Vught (10 December 1946 – 13 February 2024) was a Dutch cyclist who was active in the 1960s. He won among others a stage in the Tour of Austria.

== Biography ==
Van Vught was born on 10 December 1946 in Boxtel, the Netherlands, where he also grew up. As a cyclist he was active in the 1960s. He is regarded as one of the best cyclist ever of his region.

Van Vught rode with the amateur Caballero team. He rode criteriums in the Netherlands, many in North Brabant and won several of them. In 1967 he starting earning international top-10 results at the Tour of Austria. The next year had a podium finish at a stage of the 1968 Olympia's Tour. In June he won the sixth stage of the 1968 Tour of Austria after finishing second in the fourth stage. He won the stage with a two-minute gap ahead of Austrian Csenar. At the end of June 1968 he finished second at the Internationales Ernst-Sachs-Gedächtnis-Rennen behind Johannes Knab. In 1969 he finished sixth in the general classification of the Scottish Milk Race. In 1970 his season stopped due to a crash in the Tour of Haaren. The next year he had to retire from cycling due to persistent headache from the crash.

In the 1970s he moved from Boxtel to Sint-Michielsgestel. He stayed connected with Boxtel. He worked among others at the Michaëlschool where a schoolyard is named after him. He was also active for football clug ODC and the youth academy of RKVV Sint-Michielsgestel that later became SCG '18. In 2016 he won the "club hero" award by Brabants Dagblad.

Van Vught died on 13 February 2024 at the age of 77 years. His funeral service took place on 21 February on the main field of football club SCG '18.
