= Vojtěch Petráček =

Czech nuclear physicist

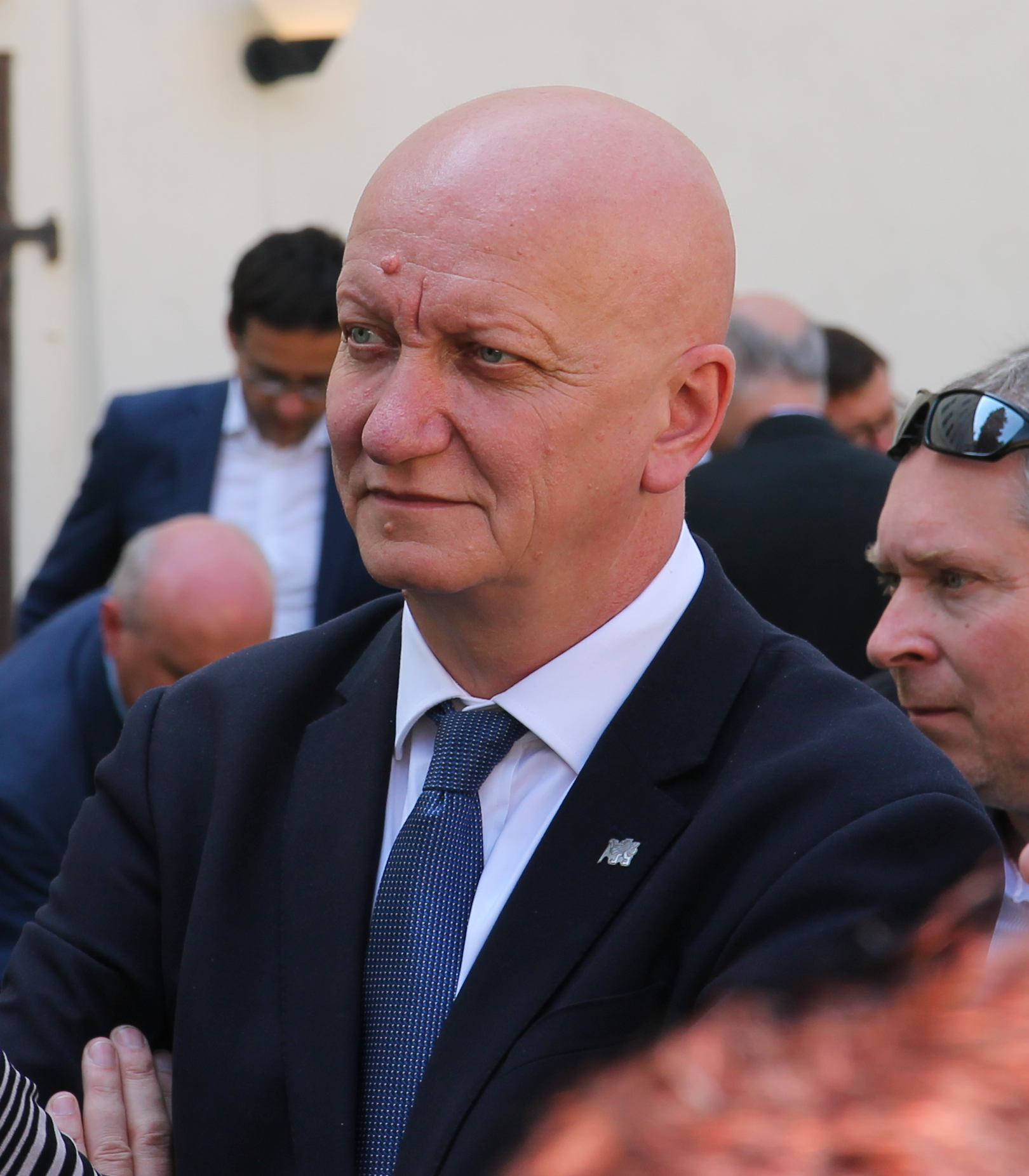
Vojtěch Petráček

Vojtěch Petráček (born 17 February 1964 in Prague) is a Czech nuclear physicist and University Lecturer. Since February 2018, He has also been the rector of the Czech Technical University in Prague (CVUT) in Prague (removed from office by an extraordinary Academic senate motion in 2025 for his "inability to manage").

== Education ==
After attending the Nad Štolou Grammar School in the Letňany, Petráček studied mathematics and physics from 1982 at the Charles University, obtaining a doctorate in 1987.

== Career ==
In 2014 he unsuccessfully ran in the Rectorate election of the ČVUT, but in 2017 he was elected and at the end of January. The press widely discussed his behavior deemed unethical, when he voted in his own election and won by a single vote. 2018 he was appointed to this position by the Czech President Miloš Zeman with effect from 1. February 2018.

In May 2025, members of the CTU Academic Senate filed a motion to dismiss the rector due to his inability to manage the university resulting in long-standing deficiencies in the school's management, including problems in budget management and approval, unexplained expenditures for legal and consulting services, preparation of internal regulations, capital construction, quality management, and labor relations. The motion followed a series of court rulings on rector Petráček's illegal behavior resulting in financial and reputational losses to the University.

On 21 May 2025, the Academic Senate of the CTU proposed to the President of the Republic, by 39 votes (out of 44 senators present), to remove Petráček from his position as rector.

On 30 May 2025, Czech President Petr Pavel decided to dismiss Vojtěch Petráček from the rector's office. The removal from office was also countersigned (agreed) by the Prime Minister on 4 June 2025.

== Publications ==
- Vojtěch Petráček, as of 2018, has co-authored 117 articles (most of them as one among hundreds of co-authors).
