= Woyzeck (disambiguation) =

Woyzeck as a name:

- Johann Christian Woyzeck (1780-1824), German murderer, executed

Woyzeck is an unfinished play written by Georg Büchner, first performed in 1913.

Woyzeck may also refer to:

- Woyzeck, a 1966 German TV film adaptation directed by Rudolf Noelte
- Woyzeck (1979 film), an adaptation of the play written and directed by Werner Herzog
- Woyzeck (1994 film), a Hungarian adaptation of the play
- Woyzeck (musical), a 2000 stage musical adaptation of the play
- Woyzeck, a 2013 German TV film adaptation starring Tom Schilling

== See also ==
- Wozzeck (disambiguation)
