= Wojciechów =

Wojciechów may refer to the following places in Poland:

- Wojciechów, Lwówek County in Lower Silesian Voivodeship (south-west Poland)
- Wojciechów, Złotoryja County in Lower Silesian Voivodeship (south-west Poland)
- Wojciechów, Chełm County in Lublin Voivodeship (east Poland)
- Wojciechów, Kraśnik County in Lublin Voivodeship (east Poland)
- Wojciechów, Lublin County in Lublin Voivodeship (east Poland)
- Wojciechów, Gmina Łaziska in Opole County, Lublin Voivodeship (east Poland)
- Wojciechów, Włodawa County in Lublin Voivodeship (east Poland)
- Wojciechów, Gmina Gomunice in Łódź Voivodeship (central Poland)
- Wojciechów, Gmina Przedbórz in Łódź Voivodeship (central Poland)
- Wojciechów, Kazimierza County in Świętokrzyskie Voivodeship (south-central Poland)
- Wojciechów, Włoszczowa County in Świętokrzyskie Voivodeship (south-central Poland)
- Wojciechów, Masovian Voivodeship (east-central Poland)
- Wojciechów, Greater Poland Voivodeship (west-central Poland)
- Wojciechów, Namysłów County in Opole Voivodeship (south-west Poland)
- Wojciechów, Olesno County in Opole Voivodeship (south-west Poland)
