= Vojtěch Suk =

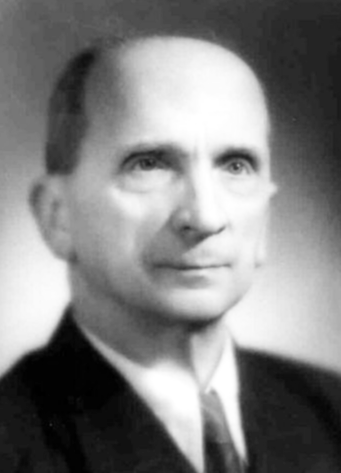
Photographic portrait of Suk

Vojtěch Suk (18 September 1879 – 8 March 1967) was a Czech medical doctor, anthropologist, ethnographer, traveller and writer. In his medical and anthropological works he promoted comparative studies of people and races.

== Early life and education ==
Suk was born on 18 September 1879 in Prague, Bohemia, Austria-Hungary. He studied medicine, philosophy, and natural sciences at universities in Prague, Zurich, and Bologna. From 1905 to 1911 he studied for the PhD at the University of Zurich's medical and anthropological faculties. He later completed the Habilitation in 1919. He later completed medical studies for the MD in 1922. In 1923, he became a lecturer at what is now Masaryk University, and became a regular faculty member in 1929. An honorary doctor of sciences title (DrSC.) was bestowed on Suk in 1955.

== Career and late life ==
From 1913 to 1914, at the urging of Czech-born anthropologist Aleš Hrdlička, Suk worked in Africa. He was there at the beginning of the First World War. Following the war, he was affiliated with Charles University from 1918 until 1923. He then moved to Brno to work at Masaryk University, which was his primary academic home until 1949. He founded, and was for many years the director, of the Anthropology Institute at the Faculty of Sciences at Masaryk University. From 1932 to 1933 he served as dean of the School, and he was later director of the School's institute for the education of physical fitness instructors.

In 1926, Suk worked as a doctor on a missionary station in northern Labrador, Canada. This work supported his inquiries into serology and hematology of differences between human races.

From 1940 to 1945, while higher education institutions were closed during the German occupation of Czechoslovakia during World War II, Suk worked as a doctor in a regional hospital in the town of Dvůr Králové nad Labem. At this time, Suk was investigated by the Gestapo for his views on the equality of human races. After 1945, he returned to Masaryk University.

Suk died on 8 March 1967 in Brno.

== Selected writings ==
In addition to scholarly publications on pharmacy and anthropology, Suk authored memoirs of his travels in Africa and Canada:

- Vojtěch Suk, Africká dobrodružství [African Adventure] (Prague: Josef R. Vilímek, 1921). 101 pages, published in Czech.
- Vojtěch Suk, Po stopách Holubových; Lékařem na Labradoru: kniha o dobrodružném putování českého lékaře po černé Africe a drsném Severu [In the Steps of Holub, a Doctor in Labrador: A Book on the Adventurous Roaming of a Czech Doctor from Darkest Africa to the Bleak North] (Brno: Blok, 1975). Published in Czech.

== Research materials ==
Suk's ethnographic objects, library, and collection of photographs were left to the Náprstek Museum of Asian, African, and American Cultures. His personal papers are stored in the archives of the National Museum in Prague.
