= Wojciech =

- Pronunciation: English: /ˈvɔɪtʃɛx/ VOY-chekh; Polish: [ˈvɔjt͡ɕɛx]
- Gender: male

Origin
- Origin: West Slavic
- Meaning: He who is happy in battle

Other names
- Nickname: Wojtek (and many others)
- Related names: Vojtěch, Vojtech, Woitke

Wojciech (IPA: [ˈvɔjt͡ɕɛx]) is a Polish name, equivalent to Czech Vojtěch [ˈvojcɛx] and Slovak Vojtech. The name is formed from two Slavic roots:

- wój (Slavic: voj), a root pertaining to war. It also forms words like wojownik ("warrior") and wojna ("war").
- ciech (from an earlier form, tech), meaning "joy".

The resulting combination means "he who enjoys war" or "joyous warrior".

Its Polish diminutive forms include Wojtek [ˈvɔjtɛk], Wojtuś [ˈvɔjtuɕ], Wojtas, Wojcio, Wojteczek, Wojcieszek, Wojtaszka, Wojtaszek, Wojan (noted already in 1136), Wojko, and variants noted as early as 1400, including Woytko, Woythko, and Voytko. Related names in South Slavic languages include Vojko, Vojislav, and Vojteh.

The name has been rendered into German in several different variations, including: Woitke, Voitke, Voytke, Woytke, Vogtke, Woytegk, Woytek, Wogtke, Woetke, Wötke, and Wotke. It appears as Woyzeck in the play of that name by Georg Büchner. A variant form is Wozzeck, the result of confusion due to the similarity of the letters ⟨y⟩ and ⟨z⟩ in Sütterlin handwriting; this form is used as the name of the opera by Alban Berg, based on Büchner's play.

The name day for individuals named Wojciech is 23 April.

== People with the name ==
- Saint Adalbert of Prague (Czech: svatý Vojtěch; Polish: Św. Wojciech), the first recorded user of this name
- Wojciech Bogusławski (1757–1829), a Polish actor, theatre director, and writer of dramas
- Wojciech Bobowski (1610–1675), an Ottoman musician, dragoman, and an intellectual of Polish descent.
- Wojciech Buliński (1929–2021), Polish architect and professor
- Wojtek Czyz (born 1980), Geman badminton player
- Wojtek Drabowicz (1966–2007), Polish opera singer
- Wojciech Fangor (1922–2015), Polish painter, graphic artist and sculptor
- Wojciech Fibak (born 1952), Polish tennis player
- Wojciech Frykowski, Polish actor, murdered in the US in 1969
- Wojciech Jaruzelski (1923–2014), Polish political and military leader, prime minister, head of the Polish Council of State, President and de facto dictator of Poland 1981–89
- Wojciech Kamiński (born 1974), Polish basketball coach
- Wojciech Kasperski (born 1981), Polish film director
- Wojciech Kilar (1932–2013), Polish composer, known especially for his film music to Dracula
- Wojtek Krakowiak (born 1976), Polish-born American soccer player
- Wojciech Kondratowicz (born 1980), Polish hammer thrower
- Wojciech Korfanty (1873–1939), a Polish activist, journalist, politician, and a leader of the Silesian uprisings
- Wojciech Kossak (1856–1942), Polish painter
- Wojciech Kowalczyk (born 1972), Polish footballer
- Wojciech Kowalski (born 1976), Polish tennis player
- Wojciech Krzemiński (1933–2017), Polish astronomer
- Wojciech "Lala" Kuderski, Polish musician, member of Myslovitz
- Wojciech Kudlik (born 1954), Polish canoeist
- Wojciech Kurtyka (born 1947), Polish mountaineer
- Wojciech Łazarek (1937–2023), Polish footballer and manager
- Wojciech Michniewski (1947–2026), Polish composer and conductor
- Wojciech Nowicki (born 1989), Polish hammer thrower
- Wojciech Olejniczak (born 1974), Polish politician
- Wojciech Orliński (born 1969), Polish journalist
- Wojciech Pollok (born 1982) Polish-German footballer
- Wojciech Powaga, Polish musician, member of Myslovitz
- Wojciech Pszoniak (1942–2020), Polish actor
- Wojciech Samotij, Polish mathematician
- Wojciech Smarzowski (born 1963), Polish screenwriter and director
- Wojciech Siudmak (born 1942), Polish painter and sculptor
- Wojciech Stattler (1800–1875), Polish painter
- Wojciech Stuchlik (born 1984), Polish tennis player
- Wojciech Szczęsny (born 1990), Polish goalkeeper
- Wojciech Szewczyk (born 1994), Polish pool player
- Wojciech Szkudlarczyk (born 1985), Polish badminton player
- Wojciech Szpankowski (born 1952), Polish-born American computer scientist
- Wojtek Urbański (born 1986), Polish music producer
- Wojciech Wąsowicz, Polish musician, member of Decapitated
- Wojciech Wentura (born 1972), Polish opera tenor
- Wojtek Wolski (born 1986), Polish-born Canadian National Hockey League forward for the Washington Capitals
- Wojciech Zabłocki (1930–2020), Polish architect and fencer
- Wojciech Zaremba (born 1988), Polish computer scientist, co-founder of OpenAI
- Wojtek Zarzycki (born 1982), Polish-born Canadian soccer player
- Wojciech H. Zurek (born 1951), Polish and American theoretical physicist
- Wojciech Żukrowski (1916–2000), Polish writer
- Wojciech Michejda (born 1939--), Polish born Architect

== Others ==
- Wojtek, a Syrian brown bear from Persia adopted by soldiers of the Polish II Corps

== See also ==
- Vojtěch
- Voytek
- Polish name
- Slavic names
- Wojciechów (disambiguation) – Polish place names
- Wojciechowski – Polish surname
