= Voigt =

Voigt or Voigts is a German surname and may refer to:

- Alexander Voigt, German football player
- Alwin Voigt (1852–1922), German school teacher, writer, and ornithologist
- Angela Voigt, East German long jumper
- Bob Voigts, American football, basketball player and coach
- Christian August Voigt (1808–1890), Austrian anatomist
- Cynthia Voigt, author of books for young adults
- Deborah Voigt, American opera singer
- Doreen Voigt (born 1984), German politician
- Edward Voigt, born in Bremen, Germany, former U.S. Representative from Wisconsin
- Edwin Edgar Voigt, bishop
- Ellen Bryant Voigt, German American poet
- Erika Voigt, actress
- Frederick Augustus Voigt (1892–1957), British journalist and author of German descent
- Friedrich Siegmund Voigt ( 1781–1850), German botanist and zoologist whose standard botanical author abbreviation is F.Voigt
- Fynn Voigt (born 1999), German politician
- Georg Voigt, German historian
- Harry Voigt, German Olympic athlete
- Irma Voigt (1882–1953), Dean of Women at Ohio University
- Jaap Voigt (born 1941), Dutch field hockey player
- Jack Voigt, American baseball player
- Jan Voigt, actor
- Jenny Voigts (1749–1814), German writer and editor
- Jens Voigt, professional road cyclist
- Joachim Otto Voigt, a Danish and German botanist whose standard botanical author abbreviation is Voigt
- Johannes Voigt, German historian and father of Georg(e)
- Karsten Voigt (born 1941), German politician
- Margarete Voigt-Schweikert (1887–1957), German composer and music critic
- Margit Voigt, German mathematician
- Mario Voigt (born 1977), German politician, Minister-President of Thuringia (2024–)
- Noelia Voigt, former Miss USA 2023 and daughter of Jack Voigt
- Philip Nolan Voigt, fictional character from Marvel Comics
- Sören Voigt (born 1971), German politician
- Stu Voigt, former NFL tight end
- Udo Voigt (1952–2025), German ultra-conservative politician
- Vanessa Voigt (born 1997), German biathlete
- Werner Voigt (1947–2023), German football player and coach
- Wilhelm Voigt (1849–1922), the "Hauptmann von Köpenick", German impostor
- Woldemar Voigt (1850–1919), German physicist
- Woldemar Voigt (engineer) (1907–1980), German engineer
- Wolfgang Voigt, electronic music artist

== See also ==
Similar surnames, possibly of different etymologies
- Vogdt, Vogt, Vogts, Voight/Voigts, Voigt, Voit, Voogd, Voogt/Voogdt/Vooght, van Vugt/Vucht/Vught, Vugts
- Vojta, Vojtěch, Vojtek, Voytek
- Wójcicki, Wojciechowski, Wójcik, Woit, Woita, Wójt, Wojtas, Wojtkiewicz/Vaitkevičius, Wójtowicz
- From Dutch for "foot": Voet, Voeten
