= Wójt (surname) =

Wójt is a Polish-language occupational surname derived from the occupation of wójt. Notable people with the surname include:

- Greg Wojt (born 1985), Polish gridiron football player
- Łukasz Wójt (born 1982), Polish swimmer

== See also ==
Similar surnames, possibly of different etymologies
- Vogt, Vogts, Voight, Voigt, Voit, Voogd
- Vojta, Vojtěch, Vojtek, Voytek
- Wójcicki, Wojciechowski, Wójcik, Woit, Woita, Wójt, Wojtas, Wojtkiewicz/Vaitkevičius, Wójtowicz
- From Dutch for "foot": Voet, Voeten
