= Vojtek =

Vojtek (feminine: Vojtková, Vojteková) is a Czech and Slovak surname. It is a pet name of the given name Vojtěch/Vojtech. Notable people with the surname include:

- Billy Vojtek (born 1943), Australian soccer player
- Jana Vojteková (born 1991), Slovak footballer
- Josef Vojtek (born 1965), Czech singer
- Martin Vojtek (born 1975), Czech ice hockey player
- Roman Vojtek (born 1972), Czech actor

== See also ==
Similar surnames, possibly of different etymologies
- Vogt, Vogts, Voight, Voigt, Voit, Voogd
- Vojta, Vojtěch, Vojtek, Voytek
- Wójcicki, Wojciechowski, Wójcik, Woit, Wójt, Wojtas, Wojtkiewicz/Vaitkevičius, Wójtowicz
- From Dutch for "foot": Voet, Voeten
