= Voytek =

Voytek is a surname. Notable people with the name include:

- Ed Voytek (born 1935), American football player
- Mary Voytek, American microbiologist
- Voytek (designer) (Wojciech Roman Pawel Jerzy Szendzikowski, 1925–2014), Polish stage, television and film designer
- Voytek (bear) (1942–1963), Polish Army bear mascot

== See also ==
Similar surnames, possibly of different etymologies
- Vogt, Vogts, Voight, Voigt, Voit, Voogd
- Vojta, Vojtěch, Vojtek, Voytek
- Wójcicki, Wojciechowski, Wójcik, Woit, Wójt, Wojtas, Wojtkiewicz/Vaitkevičius, Wójtowicz
- From Dutch for "foot": Voet, Voeten
