= Voet =

Voet is a surname. Notable people with the surname include:

- Alexander Voet the Elder (1608–1689), Flemish printmaker and publisher
- Alexander Voet the Younger (1637–1693/1705), Flemish printmaker and publisher
- Donald Voet (1938–2023), American biochemist and textbook author
- Gijsbert Voet (1589–1676), Dutch theologian
- Jacob Ferdinand Voet (c. 1639 – c. 1689/1700), Flemish Baroque portrait painter
- Johann Eusebius Voet (1706–1788), Dutch physician, poet, illustrator, and entomologist
- Johannes Voet (1647–1713), Dutch jurist
- Judith G. Voet (born 1941), American biochemist and textbook author
- Willy Voet (born 1945), Belgian sports physiotherapist

== See also ==
- Voet (measurement), an obsolete Dutch unit of measurement (Eng: "foot")

Similar surnames, possibly of different etymologies
- Vogdt, Vogt, Vogts, Voight, Voigt, Voit, Voogd
- Vojta, Vojtěch, Vojtek, Voytek
- Wójcicki, Wojciechowski, Wójcik, Woit, Woita, Wójt, Wojtas, Wojtkiewicz/Vaitkevičius, Wójtowicz
- From Dutch for "foot": Voet, Voeten
