= Mario Santoro Woith =

Italian photographer (born 1968)

Mario Santoro – Woith
- Born: 23 March 1968 (age 58); Havana, Cuba
- Education: Sapienza University of Rome
- Known for: Photography, printmaking, artist's books
- Movement: Experimental photography, xerography, xerox art, fine-art photography, conceptual photography
- Website: www.santoro-woith.com

Mario Santoro – Woith (born 1968 in Cuba) is an Italian photographer and printmaker who works in experimental photography, xerography and self-published artist's books. He lives and works in Todi, in Umbria.

His work has been exhibited internationally and is held in public artist's book collections including those of the Museum of Modern Art in New York City and the Getty Research Institute in Los Angeles. With the photography historian and curator William A. Ewing, Santoro-Woith founded the Todi Circle, an annual photography think tank held in Todi since 2012.

== Education ==
Santoro-Woith studied Visual Anthropology at the University of Rome "La Sapienza" from 1988 to 1993.

In 1996, during a Visual sociology seminar held in Viterbo, he met Professor John Grady, who invited him to present his first solo photography exhibition at Wheaton College in Massachusetts. The show was held shortly afterwards at the Wallace Library.

== Works and Technique ==
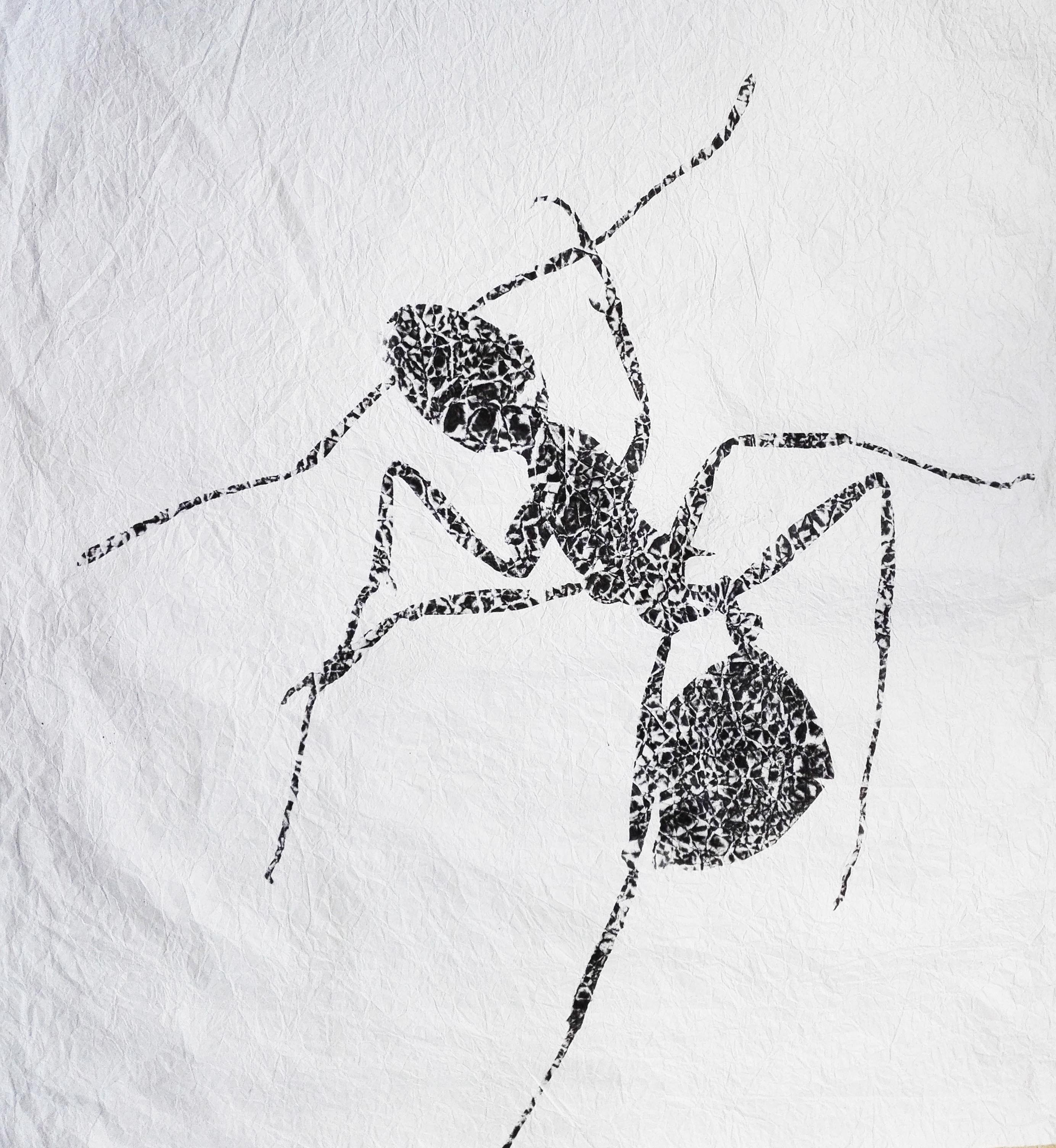
From the "Dis – sectum" project

Santoro-Woith combines photography with photocopying machines and industrial reprographic equipment, which he uses to produce exhibitions, large-scale prints and installations.

His 2014 solo exhibition Senza tregua at Acta International in Rome, curated by Francesca Pietracci, presented images of motorways, tunnels, pylons and heavy transport. A 2020 exhibition-laboratory in Todi, Simbo-logia, curated by Arianna Bettarelli, brought together works and artist's books displaying the symbolism of political power, such as the eagle motif of his E.U.R. series and portraits of dictators.

In 2015 he joined the Makroscope artists' group and exhibited at the Klaus Urbons Copymuseum in Mülheim an der Ruhr, Germany, where the group is based. From 2010 to 2012 he was one of the artists of the ABC Artists' Books Cooperative.

== Artist's books ==
Santoro-Woith has self-published several limited-edition artist's books. The books address social and political subjects, among them propaganda and imperialism.

The books combine photographic techniques, drawing, screen printing and other media. Santoro-Woith designs and prints them in his studio; the final print is built up from separately printed colours, and the copies are hand-bound in Perugia, numbered and signed. The book "EUR" was issued in 2000 in an edition of 199, printed in white, black, blue and red on recycled black Fabriano paper with screen-printed elements.

In 2011 his book trilogy — "EUR", "Decadence, Darkness, Empire" and "More War, Less Art" — was acquired by the Library Council collection of artist's books at the Museum of Modern Art in New York. The first volume examines propaganda in architecture, the second addresses imperialism and the third symbolism. Copies of "EUR" and "More War, Less Art" are also held by the Getty Research Institute, and "EUR" by the Fleet Library at the Rhode Island School of Design.

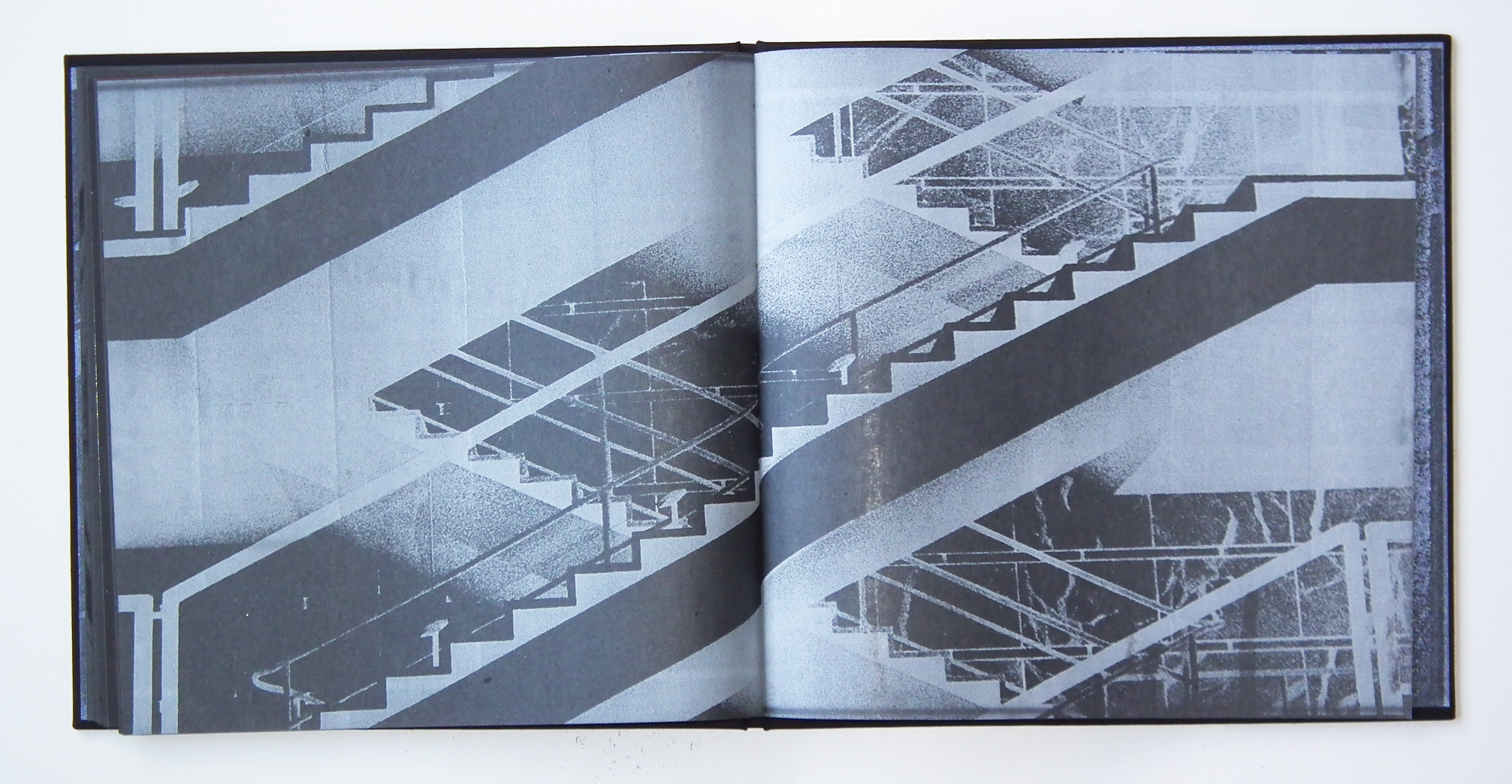
From the "EUR" book

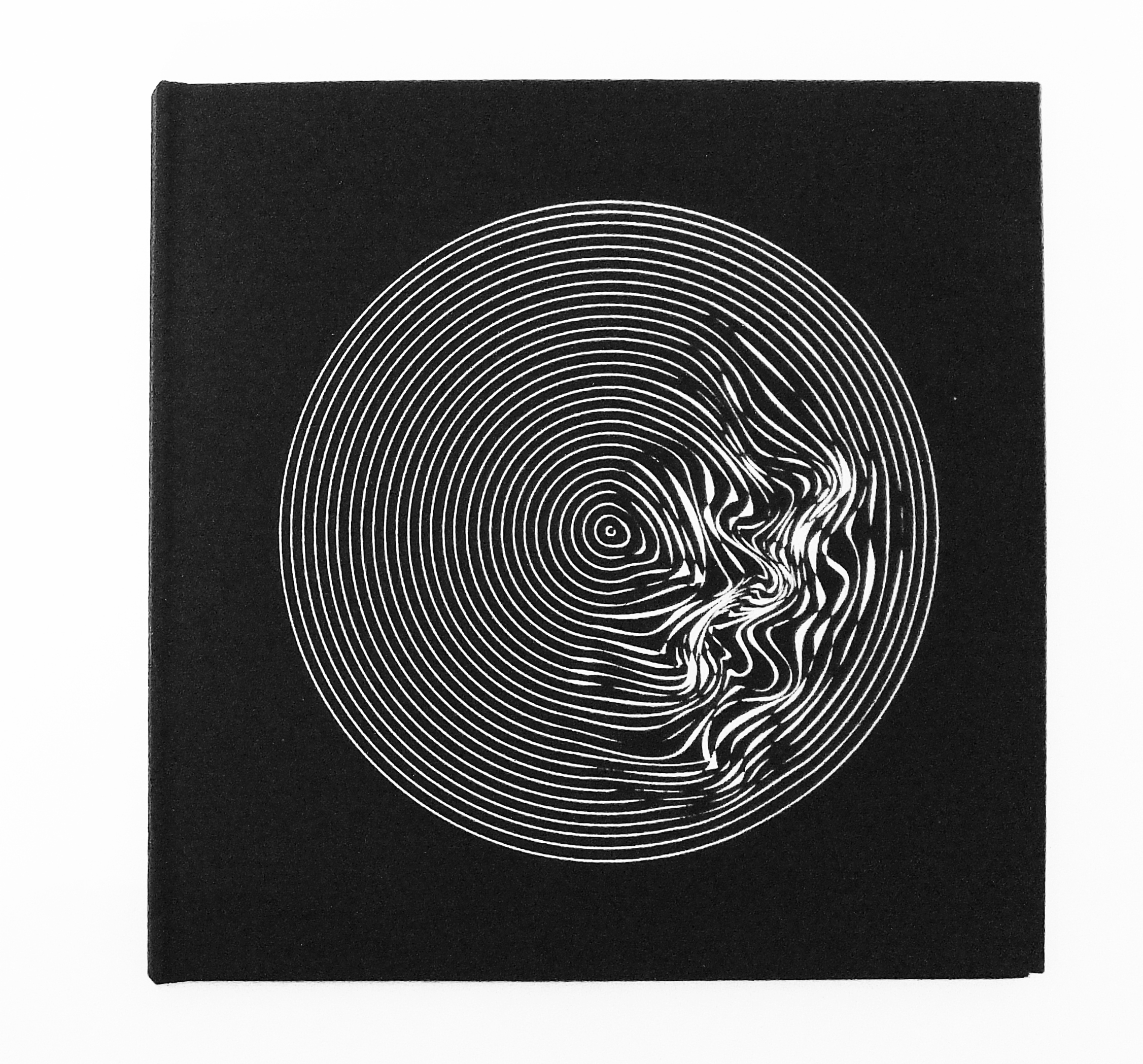
From the "More War, Less Art" book

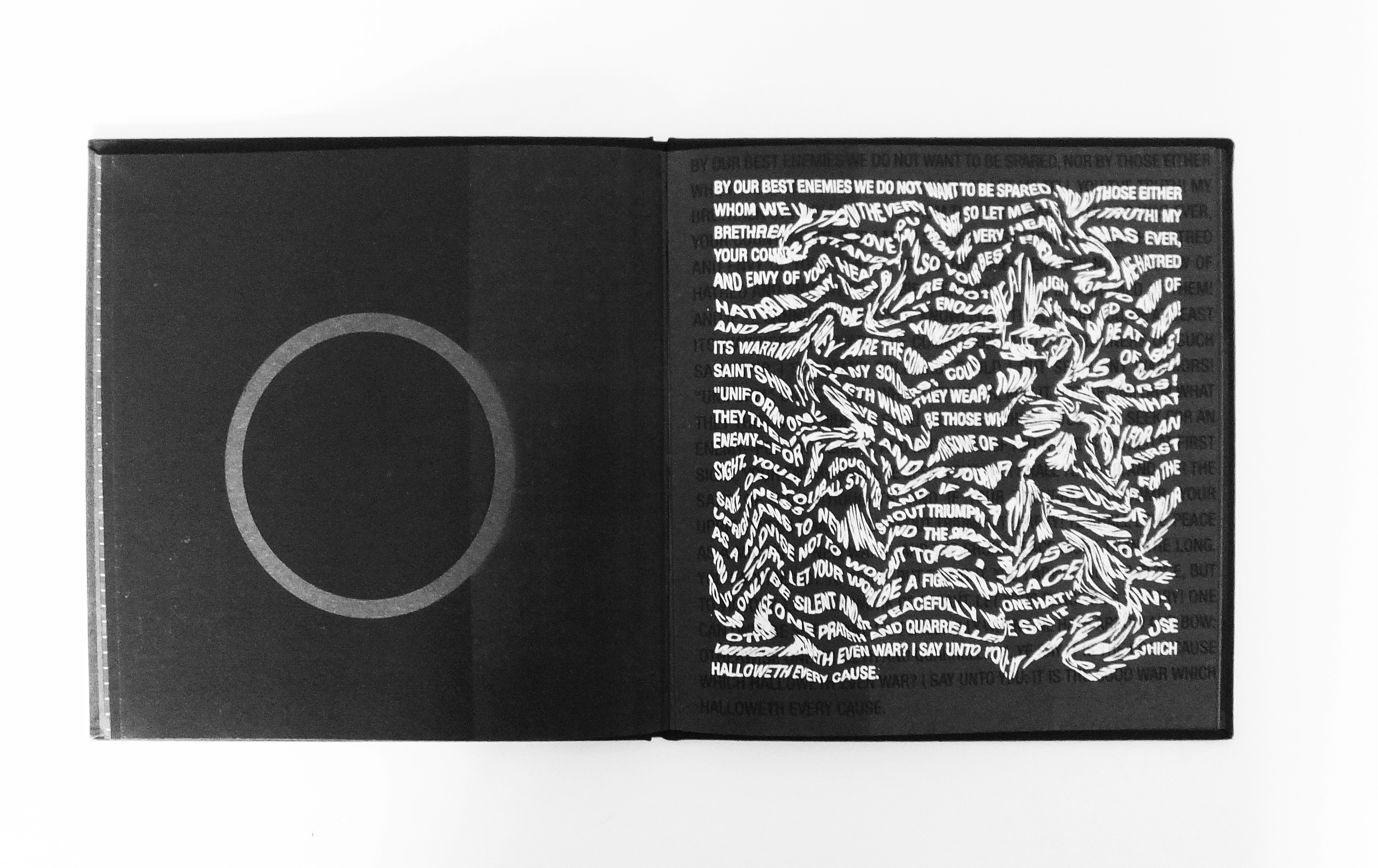
From the "More War, Less Art" book

== Todi Circle and PHOTODI ==
Santoro-Woith and William A. Ewing conceived the Todi Circle after Ewing, then director of the Musée de l'Élysée in Lausanne, visited Todi in 2005 at Santoro-Woith's invitation; the first edition was held in 2012. Twelve international guests — among them curators, collectors, dealers, publishers, photographers and scholars — are invited each year for five days of round-table discussions; the sessions are not recorded and no report is published. By 2024 the Circle had held eleven editions with 135 participants of 35 nationalities, and has been supported by the Fondation Carène, the Foundation for the Exhibition of Photography (FEP) and the MUUS Collection. The thirteenth edition took place from 7 to 13 June 2026 under Santoro-Woith's direction. He also directs the Todi Circle library in Todi, which hosts a public lecture series on photography.

Santoro-Woith is president of PHOTODI, a Todi cultural association devoted to photography and the visual arts. In 2021 PHOTODI organised the first Italian solo exhibition of the Swiss landscape photographer Richard de Tscharner, Il canto della Terra, curated by Ewing and shown in three Todi venues from 12 June to 22 August 2021.

== Public collections ==
- Museum of Modern Art, New York
- Getty Research Institute, Los Angeles
- Fleet Library at RISD, Providence
- Museum Folkwang, Essen
- Museum of Fine Arts, Houston
- Musée des beaux-arts, Le Locle

== Selected exhibitions ==
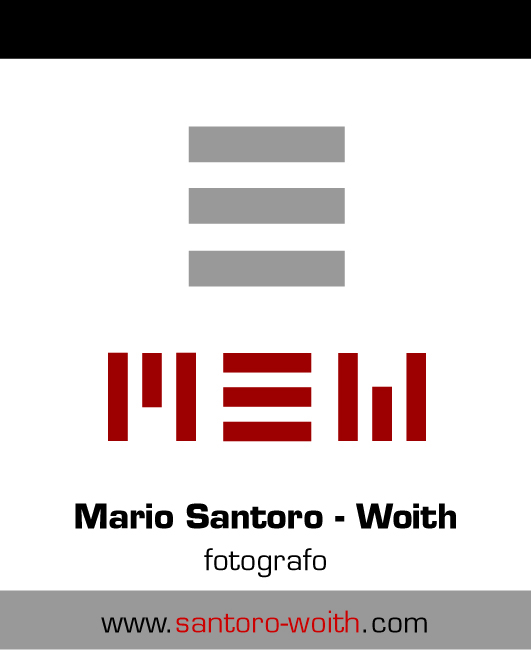
The logo of Mario Santoro Woith

- 2024 – "Uno scultore e un fotografo" ("A Sculptor and a Photographer"), with Sebastian Schadhauser, Chiesa dei SS. Filippo e Giacomo, Todi Festival, Todi;
- 2020 – "Simbo-logia", PHOTODI, Todi;
- 2015 – Klaus Urbons Copymuseum / Makroscope / Medienhaus, Mülheim an der Ruhr;
- 2015 – Nun Relais e Museum, Assisi;
- 2014 – "Senza tregua", Acta International, Rome (curator Francesca Pietracci);
- 2014 – Castello di Sismano, Todi;
- 2012 – "Archi-Texture", Jadite Gallery, New York;
- 2011 – Umbrian Pavilion, Venice Biennale, Palazzo Collicola, Spoleto;
- 2006 – "Empire, Decadence, Darkness", Italian Academy at Columbia University, New York;
- 2005 – "Heisenberg's Snapshots II", Dazzle Gallery, Tokyo;
- 2003 – "The Wizard's House", M.Y. Art Prospects Gallery, New York;
- 2002 – "Heisenberg's Snapshots", M.Y. Art Prospects Gallery, New York;
- 1999 – Galleria "Il Diaframma", Milan (curator Lanfranco Colombo);
- 1998 – Musée de l'Élysée, Lausanne (curator William A. Ewing);
- 1996 – Wallace Library, Wheaton College, Massachusetts (curator John Grady).
