= Ulyana Voitsik =

Belarusian ice hockey player

Ulyana Voitsik Ульяна Войтик
- Born: 12 October 1989 (age 36)
- Height: 1.73 m (5 ft 8 in)
- Weight: 66 kg (146 lb; 10 st 6 lb)
- Position: Forward
- Shot: Left
- Played for: Korolevy Dnepra; Istanbul Buz Korsanları SK; HK Pantera Minsk
- Playing career: c. 2011–2017

Ulyana Voitsik (Belarusian: Ульяна Войтик; born 12 October 1989) is a Belarusian retired ice hockey player. During her career, she played as a forward with the HK Pantera Minsk of the Elite Women's Hockey League (EWHL), the Istanbul Buz Korsanları SK of the Turkish Women's Ice Hockey League, and Korolevy Dnepra of the Ukrainian Women's Ice Hockey Championship.

== Career ==
Between 2011 and 2014, she played in her country for HK Pantera Minsk and participated at three matches of the 2013–14 IIHF European Women's Champions Cup.

In the 2015–16 season, Voitsik played for the Turkish team Istanbul Buz Korsanları SK, and enjoyed Turkish Ice Hockey Women's League champion title.

== Honours ==
Turkish Ice Hockey Women's League

- Istanbul Buz Korsanları SK
  - Champion (1): 2015–16.
