= Peter Woite =

Australian rules footballer

Personal information
- Born: 28 April 1952 (age 74)

Playing career^{1}
| Years | Club | Games (Goals) |
| 1969–1978 | Port Adelaide | 182 (102) |
| 1979–1980 | Glenelg | 20 (39) |
| Total | | 202 (141) |

Representative team honours
| Years | Team | Games (Goals) |
| | South Australia | 12 |
- ^{1} Playing statistics correct to the end of 1980.

Career highlights
- Port Adelaide premiership player (1977); Port Adelaide best and fairest (1975); Magarey Medalist (1975); South Australian Football Hall of Fame inductee

Peter Woite (b. 28 April 1952) is a former Australian rules footballer who played with Port Adelaide and Glenelg in the SANFL. He is on the interchange bench in Port Adelaide's official 'Greatest Team' from 1870 to 2000.

Woite was a key position player, used at both centre half forward and centre half back. After an injury riddled debut season in 1969, Woite had a good year in 1970 which saw him earn interstate selection for South Australia, the first of 12 occasions where he would represent his state. He won the Magarey Medal in 1975 as well as Port Adelaide's best and fairest award and was a member of the club's 1977 premiership team. In 1979 he crossed to Glenelg where he played his last two seasons, bringing up his 200th SANFL game milestone after managing 182 games with Port Adelaide.

== See also ==
- 1977 SANFL Grand Final
