= Jiří Vojtík =

Czech sprinter

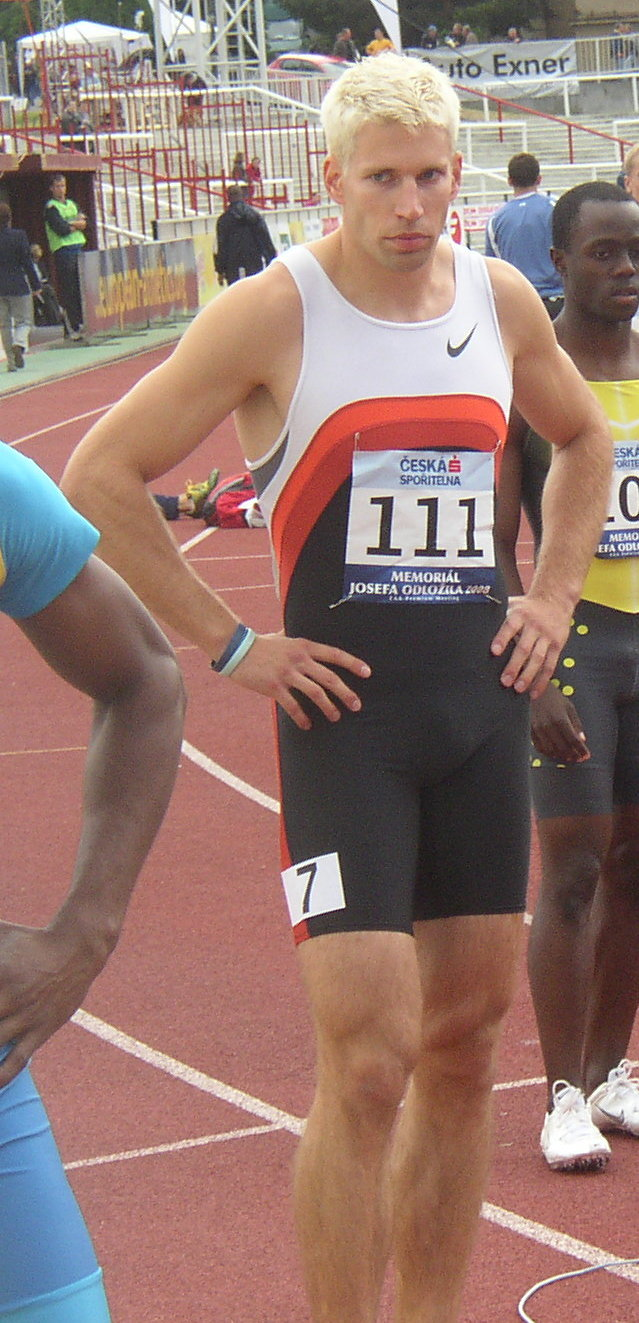
Jiří Vojtík

Jiří Vojtík (Czech pronunciation: [ˈjɪr̝iː ˈvojciːk]; born 2 July 1981 in Prague) is a Czech sprinter. He competed at the 2004 and 2008 Olympic Games in the 200 meters and ranked 33rd and 41st, respectively.
