= Woit =

Woit is a surname, a Germanized form of the Polish surname Wójt. Notable people with the surname include:

- Benny Woit (1928–2016), Canadian ice hockey player
- Peter Woit (born 1957), Latvian-American mathematician
- Richie Woit (1931–2007), American football player

== See also ==
- Vogt, Vogts, Voight, Voigt, Voit, Voogd, Woit, Wójt
- From Dutch for "foot": Voet, Voeten
