= Dominique Vugts =

Dutch association football player

Lisan Goudena
Personal information
- Date of birth: 13 November 1987 (age 38)
- Place of birth: 's-Hertogenbosch, Netherlands
- Position: Midfielder

International career
Years	Team	Apps	(Gls)
2003–2004	Netherlands U17	16	(5)
2004–2006	Netherlands U19	15	(7)
2005–2008	Netherlands	3	(0)

Dominique Vugts (born 13 November 1987) is a Dutch footballer who played as a midfielder for Willem II, FC Utrecht, SC Telstar VVNH, ADO Den Haag and AFC Ajax. Vugts won 3 caps for the Netherlands national team.
