= Vojtěch =

Vojtěch (Czech pronunciation: [ˈvojcɛx]) and Vojtech are Czech and Slovak masculine given names. They can also appear as a surname (feminine: Vojtěchová, Vojtechová). They are composed of the roots voj ('troops', 'war(rior)') and těch/tech ('consolation'). The name is interpreted either as "consoler of the troops" or "reinforcement for the troops".

The name Vojtěch has since the Early Middle Ages been perceived as the equivalent of the Germanic name Adalbert ("noble bright"), due to the saint Adalbert of Prague (Czech: svatý Vojtěch), who was the first recorded user of this name. However, the two names have no linguistic relationship with each other. Using this same artificial process, the names Vojtěch/Adalbert have been assigned to the Hungarian name Béla ('noble').

Pet forms of the name include Vojta and Vojtek. A Polish equivalent of the name is Wojciech. Notable people with the name include:

== Given name ==
=== Sports ===
- Vojtěch Bradáč (1913–1947), Czech footballer
- Vojtech Christov (born 1945), Slovak football referee
- Vojtěch Čihař (born 2007), Czech ice hockey player
- Vojtěch Dobiáš (born 2000), Czech ice hockey player
- Vojtěch Flégl (born 1967), Czech tennis player
- Vojtěch Heger (born 2000), Czech slalom canoeist
- Vojtěch Kubista (born 1993), Czech footballer
- Vojtěch Machek (born 1990), Czech footballer
- Vojtěch Mareš (1936–2025), Czech handball player
- Vojtěch Patrák (born 2000), Czech footballer
- Vojtěch Patzel (born 1998), Czech handball player
- Vojtěch Plát (born 1994), Czech-Slovak chess grandmaster
- Vojtěch Štajf (born 1974), Czech rally driver
- Vojtěch Varadín (1948–2018), Slovak footballer
- Vojtěch Vašíček (1956–2024), Czech paralympic athlete
- Vojtěch Zapletal (born 1998), Czech wildwater canoeist

=== Arts and entertainment ===
- Vojtěch Bartoněk (1859–1908), Czech painter and art restorer
- Vojtěch Dyk (born 1985), Czech actor and singer
- Josef Vojtěch Hellich (1807–1880), Czech painter and archaeologist
- Vojtěch Hřímalý (1842–1908), Czech composer and violinist
- Vojtěch Hynais (1854–1925), Czech painter and designer
- Vojtěch Jasný (1925–2019), Czech film director and screenwriter
- Adalbert Gyrowetz (Czech: Vojtěch Matyáš Jírovec; 1763–1850), Czech-Austrian composer
- Vojtěch Benedikt Juhn (1779–1843), Czech painter and engraver
- Vojtěch Kotek (born 1988), Czech actor
- Vojtěch Kubašta (1914–1992), Czech artist and illustrator
- Vojtěch Nejedlý (1772–1844), Czech poet and priest
- Vojtěch Preissig (1873–1944), Czech typographer and designer
- Rudolf Vojtěch Špillar (1878–1949), Czech painter and photographer
- Vojtěch Sucharda (1884–1968), Czech sculptor, woodcarver and puppeteer
- Vojtěch Ignác Ullmann (1822–1897), Czech architect
- Vojtech Zamarovský (1919–2006), Slovak writer

=== Science and academia ===
- Vojtech Alexander (1857–1916), Slovak radiologist
- Vojtěch Broža (1935–2026), Czech hydraulic engineer
- Vojtech Čelko (born 1946), Slovak-Czech historian
- Alberto Vojtěch Frič (1882–1944), Czech botanist and ethnographer
- Vojtěch Jarník (1897–1970), Czech mathematician
- Vojtech Mastny (historian) (born 1936), Czech-born American historian
- Vojtěch Merunka (born 1967), Czech computer scientist
- Vojtěch Petráček (born 1964), Czech nuclear physicist
- Vojtěch Rödl (born 1949), Czech-American mathematician
- Vojtěch Rosický (1880–1942), Czech geologist
- Alois Vojtěch Šembera (1807–1882), Czech linguist and historian of literature
- Vojtěch Šafařík (1829–1902), Czech chemist
- Vojtěch Suk (1879–1967), Czech medical doctor, anthropologist and ethnographer

=== Other ===
- Adalbert of Prague (Czech: Vojtěch; c. 956 – 997), Czech missionary, bishop and saint
- Vojtěch Adam (born 1950), Czech politician
- Vojta Beneš (born Vojtěch Beneš; 1878–1951), Czech educator and political leader
- Vojtěch Cikrle (born 1946), Czech Catholic prelate
- Vojtěch Filip (born 1955), Czech politician
- Vojtěch Mastný (1874–1954), Czech lawyer and diplomat
- Vojtěch Náprstek (1826–1894), Czech philanthropist, journalist and politician
- Vojtěch Mynář (1944–2018), Czech politician
- Vojtěch I of Pernštejn (1490–1534), Czech nobleman
- Vojtech Tuka (1880–1946), Slovak politician

== Surname ==
- Adam Vojtěch (born 1986), Czech politician and lawyer
- Štěpán Vojtěch (born 1977), Czech rally driver
