= Voit (surname) =

Voit is a German surname, a phonetic variant of Vogt. Notable people with the surname include:

- August von Voit
- Brigitte Voit
- Carl von Voit
- Eszter Voit
- G. Mark Voit
- Luke Voit
- Mitch Voit
- Otto Voit
- Robert Voit

== See also ==
- Voit Peak
- W. J. Voit Memorial Trophy
- Vogt, Vogts, Voight, Voigt, Voit, Voogd
- From Dutch for "foot": Voet, Voeten
