= Vaitkevičius =

- Lithuanian surname
- m.: Vaitkevičius
- f.: (unmarried): Vaitkevičiūtė
- f.: (married): Vaitkevičienė

Vaitkevičius is a Lithuanian language family name corresponding to the Polish surname Wojtkiewicz. It may refer to:

- Irena Vaitkevičienė, Lithuanian rower
- Daiva Vaitkevičienė-Astramskaitė, Lithuanian folklorist
- Ričardas Vaitkevičius (1933 – 1996), Lithuanian rower
- Vykintas Vaitkevičius, Lithuanian archaeologist
