= Voight =

Voight is a variant of the German surname Vogt.

== People ==
Notable people with the surname include:

- Barry Voight (born 1937), American geologist
- Charles Voight (1887–1947), American cartoonist
- Curt Voight, American politician
- Dutch Voight (1888–1986), American gangster
- Hank Voight, fictional character in the TV series Chicago P.D.
- Jack Voight (born 1945), former State Treasurer of Wisconsin
- Jon Voight (born 1938), American actor
- Robert G. Voight (1921–2008), American academic
- James Haven (born 1973), American actor and producer born James Haven Voight; son of Jon Voight
- Angelina Jolie (born 1975), American actress and director born Angelina Jolie Voight; daughter of Jon Voight
- Chip Taylor (1940–2026), American songwriter born James Wesley Voight

== Fictional characters ==
- Hank Voight, a fictional character from Chicago P.D.
- Characters from Terminator 2: Judgment Day:
  - Janelle Voight, John Connor's foster mother and T-1000 alter ego
  - Todd Voight, John Connor's foster father

== See also ==
- Voigt pipe
- Voight-Kampff machine
  - Voight-Kampff test
- Vogt, Vogts, Voight, Voigt, Voit, Voogd
- From Dutch for "foot": Voet, Voeten
