= Voogd (surname) =

Voogd is a surname. Notable people with the surname include:

- Bob de Voogd (born 1988), Dutch field hockey player
- Floris de Voogd (c.1228–1258), brother and proxy of William II of Holland
- Hendrik Voogd (1768–1839), painter and printmaker
- Jan de Voogd (1924–2015), Dutch politician

== See also ==
- Voogd for the name's origin
- Vogt, Vogts, Voight, Voigt, Voit, Voogd
- From Dutch for "foot": Voet, Voeten
