= Vogts =

Surname

Vogts is a surname, and may refer to:

- Berti Vogts (born 30 December 1946), German football player and manager
- Howard C. Vogts (1929 – 7 August 2010), American football coach

== See also ==
- Vogt, Vogts, Voight, Voigt, Voit, Voogd
- From Dutch for "foot": Voet, Voeten
