= Wojciechowski =

Wojciechowski (Polish pronunciation: [vɔjt͡ɕɛˈxɔfskʲi]; feminine: Wojciechowska [vɔjt͡ɕɛˈxɔfska]; plural Wojciechowscy [vɔjt͡ɕɛˈxɔfst͡sɨ]) is the 16th most common surname in Poland (66,879 people in 2009) and also the third most common in Greater Poland (12,928). It is derived from the Polish first name Wojciech.

Over 50% of Poles with this surname live in Greater Poland, Mazovia and Kujawy.

The Czech equivalent is Vojtěchovský, the Belarusian is Вайцяхоўскі, the Russian is Войтеховский, Voytsekhovsky, and the Lithuanian is Vaičekauskas.

== Notable people ==
- Adam Wojciechowski (rower) (born 1980), Polish rower
- Adam Wojciechowski (engineer) (fl. 1999–present), Polish engineer and professor
- Antoni Wojciechowski (1905–1938), Polish chess master
- Asher Wojciechowski (born 1988), American baseball player
- Dariusz Wojciechowski (born 1968), Polish cyclist
- Gene Wojciechowski, American sportswriter
- Greg Wojciechowski (born 1951), American wrestler
- Maia Wojciechowska (1927–2002), Polish-American novelist
- John Wojciechowski (born 1963), American football player
- Julia Wojciechowska (gymnast, born 1915) (1915–1986), Polish gymnast
- Kazimierz Wojciechowski (1904–1941), Polish Catholic clergyman
- Martyna Wojciechowska (born 1974), Polish journalist
- Mathieu Wojciechowski, French basketball player
- Oliwier Wojciechowski, Polish footballer
- Paweł Wojciechowski (economist), Polish economist
- Paweł Wojciechowski (footballer, born 1984), Polish footballer
- Paweł Wojciechowski (footballer, born 1990) (born 1990), Polish footballer
- Paweł Wojciechowski (pole vaulter), Polish pole vaulter
- Stanisław Wojciechowski (1869–1953), President of Poland 1922–1926
- Stephen Wojciechowski, birth name of Steve Wochy (born 1922), Canadian ice hockey player
- Steve Wojciechowski (baseball) (born 1970), American professional baseball player
- Steve Wojciechowski (born 1976), American basketball player and coach
- Tadeusz Wojciechowski (1838–1919), Polish historian, professor
- Tadeusz Wojciechowski (1925–2026), Polish economist, professor, and Warsaw Uprising participant
- Tytus Woyciechowski (1808–1879), Polish politician
- Ziemowit Wojciechowski, Polish fencer
- Zofia Wojciechowska-Grabska (1905–1992), Polish painter
- Zygmunt Wojciechowski (1900–1955), Polish historian

== See also ==
- Wojciech, a Polish given name
- Wojciechów (disambiguation)
- Gerda Voitechovskaja
