= Wojtas =

Wojtas is a Polish surname. It may refer to:

- Alina Wojtas (born 1987), Polish handball player
- Arkadiusz Wojtas (born 1977), Polish cyclist
- Edward Wojtas (1955–2010), Polish politician
- Jan Wojtas (born 1966), Polish biathlete
- Tadeusz Wojtas (born 1955), Polish cyclist
- Wiktor Wojtas (born 1986), Polish esports player
