= Voeten =

Voeten is a surname. Notable people with the surname include:

- Erik Voeten (born 1972), Dutch/American political scientist
- Teun Voeten, Dutch photojournalist and cultural anthropologist

== See also ==
- Voet, another surname
- Voet (measurement), plural voeten, an obsolete Dutch unit of measurement (Eng: "foot/feet")
