= Ramadi (disambiguation) =

Ramadi is a city in Iraq.

Ramadi may also refer to:

- Battle of Ramadi (disambiguation)
- Ramadi FC, a football club based in Ramadi
- Ramadi District in Iraq
- Ramadi Barrage, a two-section dam near Ramadi, Iraq
- Al Ramadi Stadium, a stadium in Ramadi, Iraq
- Lazy Ramadi, a spoof video
- Al-Ramadi, Deir ez-Zor Governorate, a Syrian town

== See also ==
- Ramati
- Rahmati
