= YouTube copyright issues =

YouTube copyright issues relate to how the Google-owned site implements its protection methods. The systems are designed to protect the exclusivity of a given creator and owner and the rights to reproduce their work. YouTube uses automated measures such as copyright strikes, Content ID and Copyright Verification Program. These methods have been criticized for favoring companies and their use of copyright claims to limit usage of uploaded content.

When a person or company creates an original work that is fixed in a physical medium, they automatically own copyright to the work. The owner has the exclusive right to use the work in certain, specific ways. In response to a lawsuit from Viacom, video sharing service YouTube developed a copyright enforcement tool referred to as Content ID which automatically scans uploaded content against a database of copyrighted material ingested by third-parties. If an uploaded video is matched against an asset in the database, YouTube warns the user of the match and applies a predetermined 'match policy'.

== Beginnings ==
YouTube has faced numerous challenges and criticisms in its attempts to deal with copyright, including the site's first viral video, Lazy Sunday, which had to be taken due to copyright concerns. At the time of uploading a video, YouTube users are shown a message asking them not to violate copyright laws. Despite this advice, many unauthorized clips of copyrighted material remain on YouTube. YouTube does not view videos before they are posted online, and it is left to copyright holders to issue a DMCA takedown notice pursuant to the terms of the Online Copyright Infringement Liability Limitation Act. Any successful complaint about copyright infringement results in a YouTube copyright strike. Three successful complaints for copyright infringement against a user account will result in the account and all of its uploaded videos being deleted. Organizations including Viacom, Mediaset, and the English Premier League have filed lawsuits against YouTube, claiming that it has done too little to prevent the uploading of copyrighted material. Viacom, demanding $1 billion in damages, said that it had found more than 150,000 unauthorized clips of its material on YouTube that had been viewed "an astounding 1.5 billion times". YouTube responded by stating that it "goes far beyond its legal obligations in assisting content owners to protect their works".

During the same court battle, Viacom won a court ruling requiring YouTube to hand over 12 terabytes of data detailing the viewing habits of every user who has watched videos on the site. The decision was criticized by the Electronic Frontier Foundation, which called the court ruling "a setback to privacy rights". In June 2010, Viacom's lawsuit against Google was rejected in a summary judgment, with U.S. federal Judge Louis L. Stanton stating that Google was protected by provisions of the Digital Millennium Copyright Act. Viacom announced its intention to appeal the ruling. On April 5, 2012, the United States Court of Appeals for the Second Circuit reinstated the case, allowing Viacom's lawsuit against Google to be heard in court again. On March 18, 2014, the lawsuit was settled after seven years with an undisclosed agreement.

In August 2008, a US court ruled in Lenz v. Universal Music Corp. that copyright holders cannot order the removal of an online file without first determining whether the posting reflected fair use of the material. The case involved Stephanie Lenz from Gallitzin, Pennsylvania, who had made a home video of her 13-month-old son dancing to Prince's song "Let's Go Crazy", and posted the 29-second video on YouTube. In the case of Smith v. Summit Entertainment LLC, professional singer Matt Smith sued Summit Entertainment for the wrongful use of copyright takedown notices on YouTube. He asserted seven causes of action, and four were ruled in Smith's favor.

In April 2012, a court in Hamburg ruled that YouTube could be held responsible for copyrighted material posted by its users. The performance rights organization GEMA argued that YouTube had not done enough to prevent the uploading of German copyrighted music. YouTube responded by stating:

We remain committed to finding a solution to the music licensing issue in Germany that will benefit artists, composers, authors, publishers, and record labels, as well as the wider YouTube community.

On November 1, 2016, the dispute with GEMA was resolved, with Google content ID being used to allow advertisements to be added to videos with content protected by GEMA.

In April 2013, it was reported that Universal Music Group and YouTube have a contractual agreement that prevents content blocked on YouTube by a request from UMG from being restored, even if the uploader of the video files a DMCA counter-notice. When a dispute occurs, the uploader of the video has to contact UMG. YouTube's owner Google announced in November 2015 that they would help cover the legal cost in select cases where they believe fair use defenses apply.

== Content ID ==
At the end of 2013, YouTube enabled automated Content ID claiming on videos uploaded by users who were signed with multi-channel networks (MCN). Previously, videos uploaded to channels that were linked to MCNs could only be claimed manually or removed with a DMCA takedown. This led to a large number of new claims which suddenly left uploaders unable to place advertisements on their videos until they disputed. Users such as Angry Joe created videos complaining about the changes and how they would negatively affect the livelihoods of video creators.

According to a 2021 transparency report published by YouTube, more than 2.2 million videos were reinstated due to false copyright claims, which represent 1% of more than 729 million copyright claims spanning from January to June 2021. According to a report by Lindsay Dodgson of Business Insider, creators were "held hostage" by false copyright claims, where the Content ID System and DMCA implementations are abused to extort money from creators.

== Attempts at copyright enforcement ==
In 2015 YouTubers known as the Fine Brothers, who produce "reaction videos", applied to trademark the word "react" when it was used in an uploaded video title to protect their series such as "Kids React" or "Adults React". An action that received severe criticism from other YouTubers because it would mean – if successful – that similarly named videos could be removed according to YouTube's copyright system.

In 2016, the Fine Brothers launched React World. This was a program where people could use Fine Brothers' icons to make their own videos for free. However, all uploaded "React" content had to be monetized on YouTube and some of the uploader's revenue would be paid to the Fine Brothers. After a massive backlash against what Fine Brothers were doing, they canceled the program and rescinded their copyright and trademarks application. It has been estimated their actions lost more than 400,000 subscribers.

== Copyright claims ==
In November 2015 this issue was highly publicized when a review of the film Cool Cat Saves the Kids by the channel "I Hate Everything" was removed by YouTube, along with videos on Channel Awesome and Markiplier. This led to a large number of complaints against YouTube and on social media sites like Twitter. This prompted YouTube's CEO Susan Wojcicki to respond three months later with "Thank you @YouTube community for all the feedback. We're listening" in February 2016.

Videos continued to be removed and flagged on the site when copyright claims were made against uploaders for using the alleged use of protected material. On April 25, 2016, YouTuber and freelance video game critic James Stephanie Sterling included clips of footage from Metal Gear Solid V, Grand Theft Auto V and Beyond: Two Souls, as well as the song "Chains of Love", in a video largely discussing Star Fox Zero. Sterling explained this at the end of the video as a way of preventing Nintendo from claiming and monetizing the video by including other material which was similarly flagged by Content ID, hoping that multiple claims would prevent anyone from monetizing the video and running advertisements on their channel, which is intended to be ad-free and funded solely by Patreon. In a follow-up video, they claimed that the technique, which they termed the "copyright deadlock", had succeeded, as the video received multiple ContentID claims, one of which attempted to monetize the video, while two others prevented any monetization, allowing the video to run advertisement-free. Sterling stated that this was indicative of a poorly designed system on YouTube's part, as a video which was well within the bounds of fair use had attracted three copyright claims. They also claimed that they would continue to include material that had previously received Content ID claims in videos likely to attract monetization attempts from the copyright owners, since fair use was not protecting their videos from copyright claims, pointing out that they now felt incentivized to use as much copyrighted material in their videos as possible, the opposite of what YouTube's copyright policies were intended to achieve.

In May 2016, a YouTube user Matt Hosseinzadeh sued the YouTube channel h3h3productions (run by Ethan and Hila Klein) citing a video that criticized his content. Fellow YouTube user Philip DeFranco started a GoFundMe fundraiser entitled "Help for H3H3". The initiative raised over $130,000. The Kleins later uploaded a video where they announced that any funds from the fundraiser left over from their lawsuit would be entrusted in to a 'Fair Use Protection Account', which other users could request assistance from in the event they were sued for copyright infringement.

On December 13, 2018, TheFatRat posted on Twitter that one of his songs, "The Calling", was content claimed by a user named Ramjets for unfairly using a song on the behalf of Andres Galvis, who had remixed the original track. He originally appealed but was denied as it is not YouTube, but the user claiming the content who has the final say over the appeal. He messaged YouTube to appeal, but YouTube said that they do not mediate copyright claims. The claim was later removed, with Google terminating the claimant's YouTube channel and multi-channel network.

On Jan 30, 2019, ObbyRaidz, a channel with 6000 subscribers, tweeted that someone called VengefulFlame had messaged him saying that they had put two copyright strikes on his channel, even though he did not infringe on any content, telling him to pay $150 to get the strikes removed, or else his channel would receive a third strike and be taken down. When he tweeted it, VengefulFlame messaged him: "Hey, we saw you tweet about us, Not sure why you thought that was a good idea or if you thought you would remotely get any help, but this has violated any potential deal. Enjoy your third copyright strike." Kenzo, a channel with 60000 subscribers, said that VengefulFlame also messaged him to tell him to pay $600 or $400 worth of bitcoin and said they were paid by someone else to strike him. YouTube, however, stepped in, resolving the strike and terminating the channel.

In January 2020, Jukin Media has been criticized for extorting YouTubers MxR and Potastic Panda, asking $6,000 for copyright infringement. In this case, one of the pair's reaction videos saw them watch four clips recently bought by Jukin Media, which has promptly issued them with an invoice for four cases of infringing on its copyright. Jukin Media scouts for online videos going viral and licenses them. Liang expressed concern in a video posted on January 13, 2020, that the pair were being "extorted" and could lose their channel if Jukin Media contacted Google with all four claims at once, as this could potentially break YouTube's "three strikes" rule. He added that the pair had previously paid Jukin Media when it demanded cash for copyrighted material.

Following a revelation in October 2020 that a truck in a "self-driving" video was actually just rolling down a hill, Nikola Corporation issued takedown notices against several videos which used that footage.

=== Safe downloading alternatives ===
In response to aggressive copyright enforcement, some users seek tools to download videos for fair use purposes.
