= Magnolia Bakery =

Bakery in New York City

Coordinates: 40.7359°N 74.0050°W

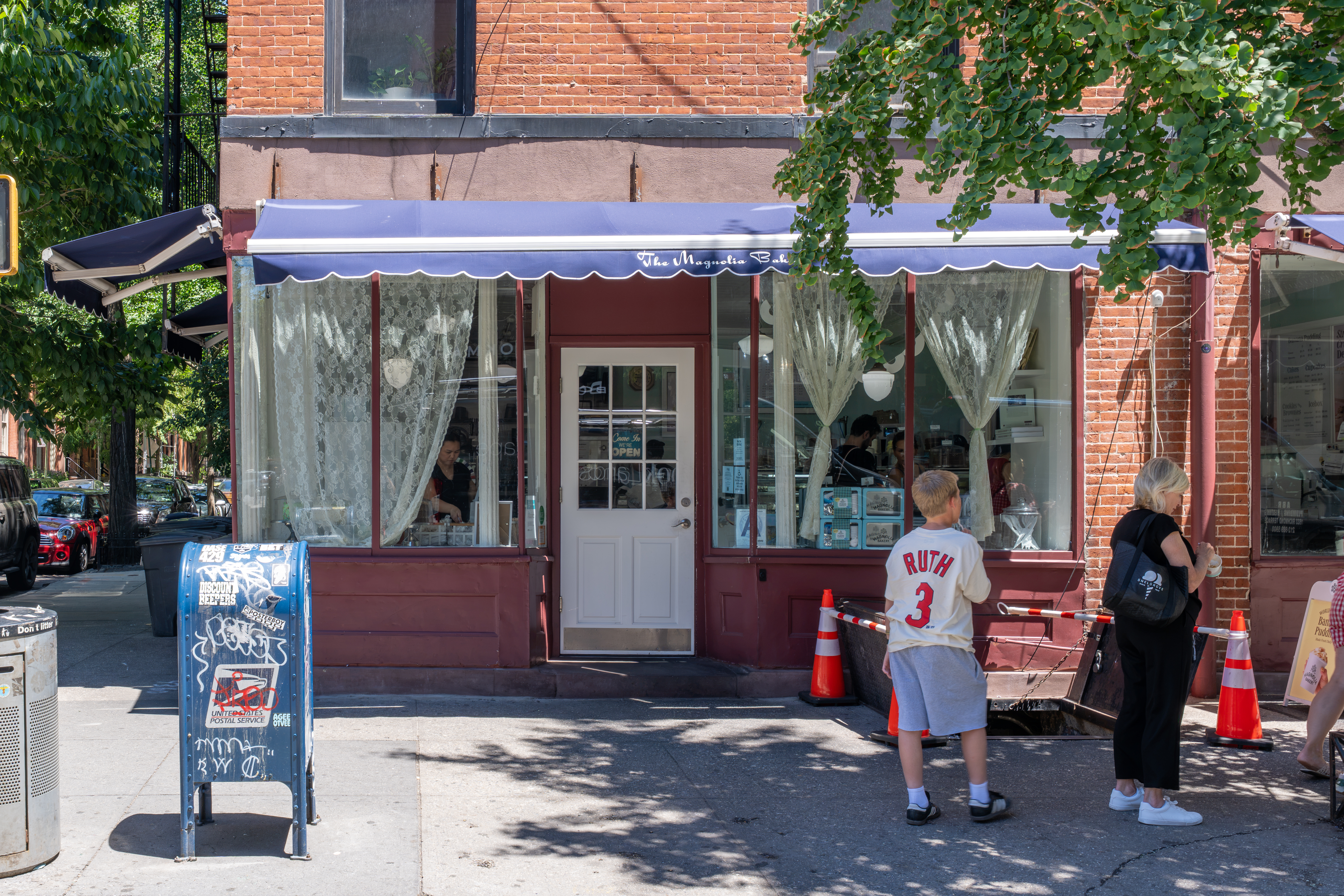
- (2026)
- Interactive map of Magnolia Bakery

Restaurant information
- Owner: RSE Ventures
- Previous owners: Jennifer Appel and Allysa Torey; Steve Abrams
- Location: 401 Bleecker Street, New York City, New York, U.S.

Magnolia Bakery is a chain of bakeries founded in New York City. The first location opened in 1996 at 401 Bleecker Street, on the corner of West 11th Street in the West Village neighborhood of Manhattan. The bakery is known for its desserts, especially its cupcakes and banana pudding.

== History ==
The original Magnolia Bakery was opened in 1996 by Jennifer Appel and Allysa Torey at 401 Bleecker Street in Manhattan. The bakery began making cupcakes with leftover cake batter, and the cupcakes subsequently became very popular with customers. The bakery is sometimes credited with helping to start a 1990s "cupcake craze". Co-owners Appel and Torey published a book in 1999 entitled The Magnolia Bakery Cookbook: Old-Fashioned Recipes from New York's Sweetest Bakery.

In 1999, co-owner Jennifer Appel left the business after a disagreement about expansion plans. Appel opened Buttercup Bake Shop at 973 Second Avenue in the Midtown East section of Manhattan.

In 2006, Allysa Torey sold Magnolia Bakery to Steve Abrams.

In 2015, Steve Abrams, his brother Danny, and a third partner opened a satellite location of restaurant J.G. Melon through a franchising deal at 89 MacDougal Street in Manhattan's Greenwich Village, which sold Magnolia Bakery desserts until it closed in 2019.

In early 2021, Magnolia Bakery was acquired for an undisclosed sum by RSE Ventures, a private equity firm co-founded by billionaire Hudson Yards developer and investor Stephen M. Ross and Matt Higgins, and appointed Bobbie Lloyd as Chief Executive Officer.

== In popular culture ==
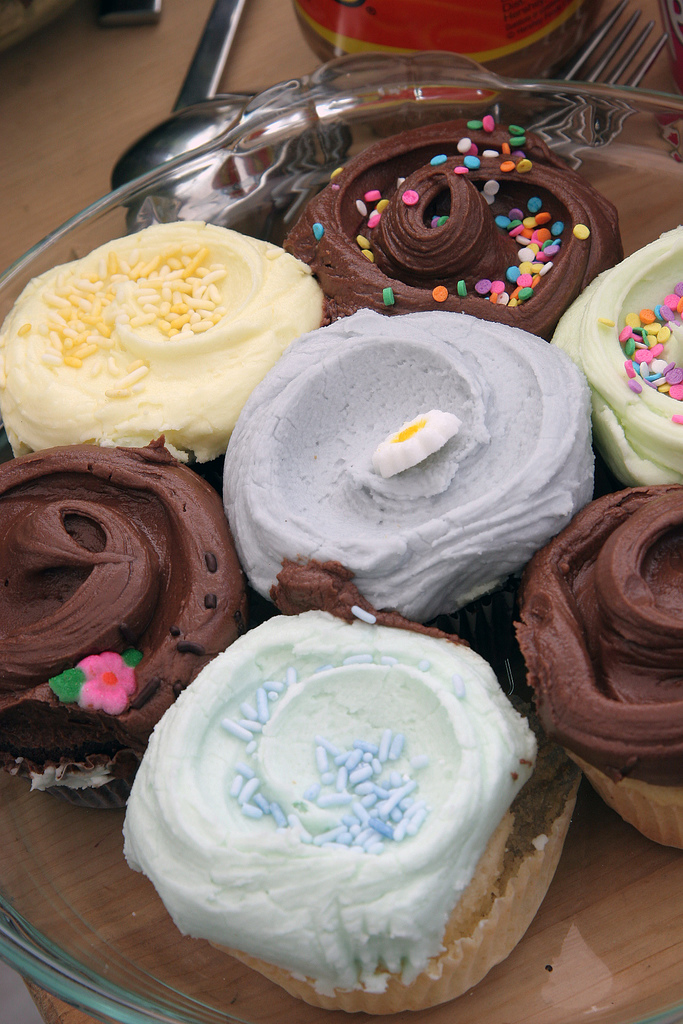
Magnolia's cupcakes

The exterior of the original bakery, as well as its cupcakes, were featured in "Lazy Sunday", a Saturday Night Live Digital Short broadcast in December 2005. The bakery was also featured on Sex and the City; in the film Prime, in which one of the characters throws Magnolia pies at his ex-girlfriends; and in The Devil Wears Prada, in which the character Andy says at one point that she needs to get to the bakery to pick something up for her boyfriend.

The sitcom Spin City also has Charlie Sheen's character bringing Magnolia Cupcakes to Heather Locklear's character. On October 16, 2008, Conan O'Brien bought a cupcake for each member of his audience during a taping of Late Night. It was also briefly mentioned in the third season of Veronica Mars, the title character affectionately mentioning a picture of her father "stuffing cupcakes in [his] face at Magnolia Bakery."

== Locations ==
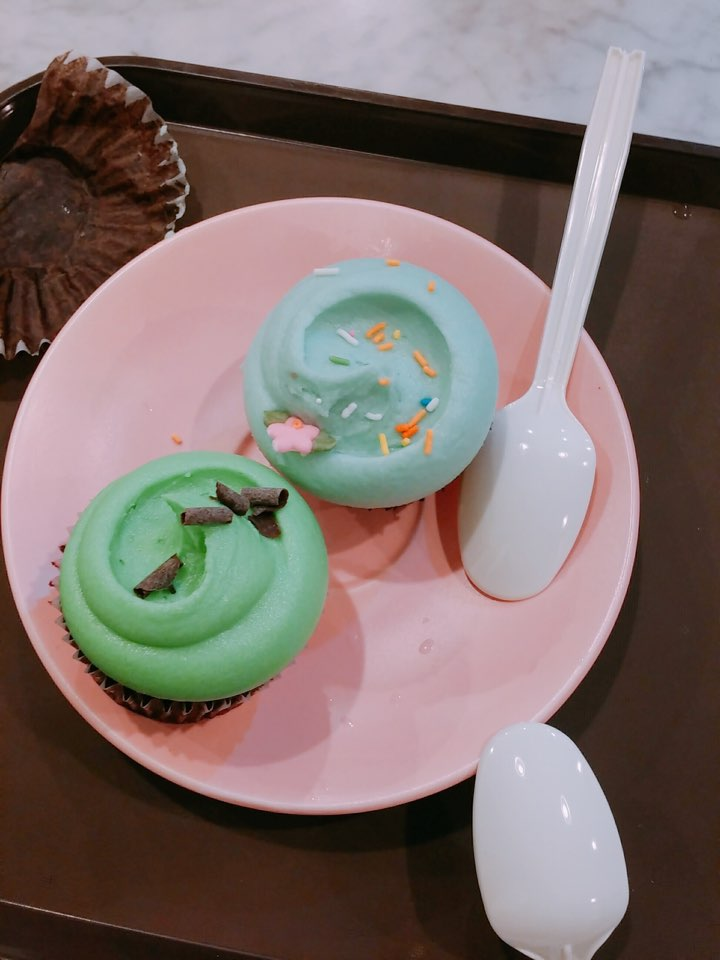
Magnolia's Cupcakes in South Korea

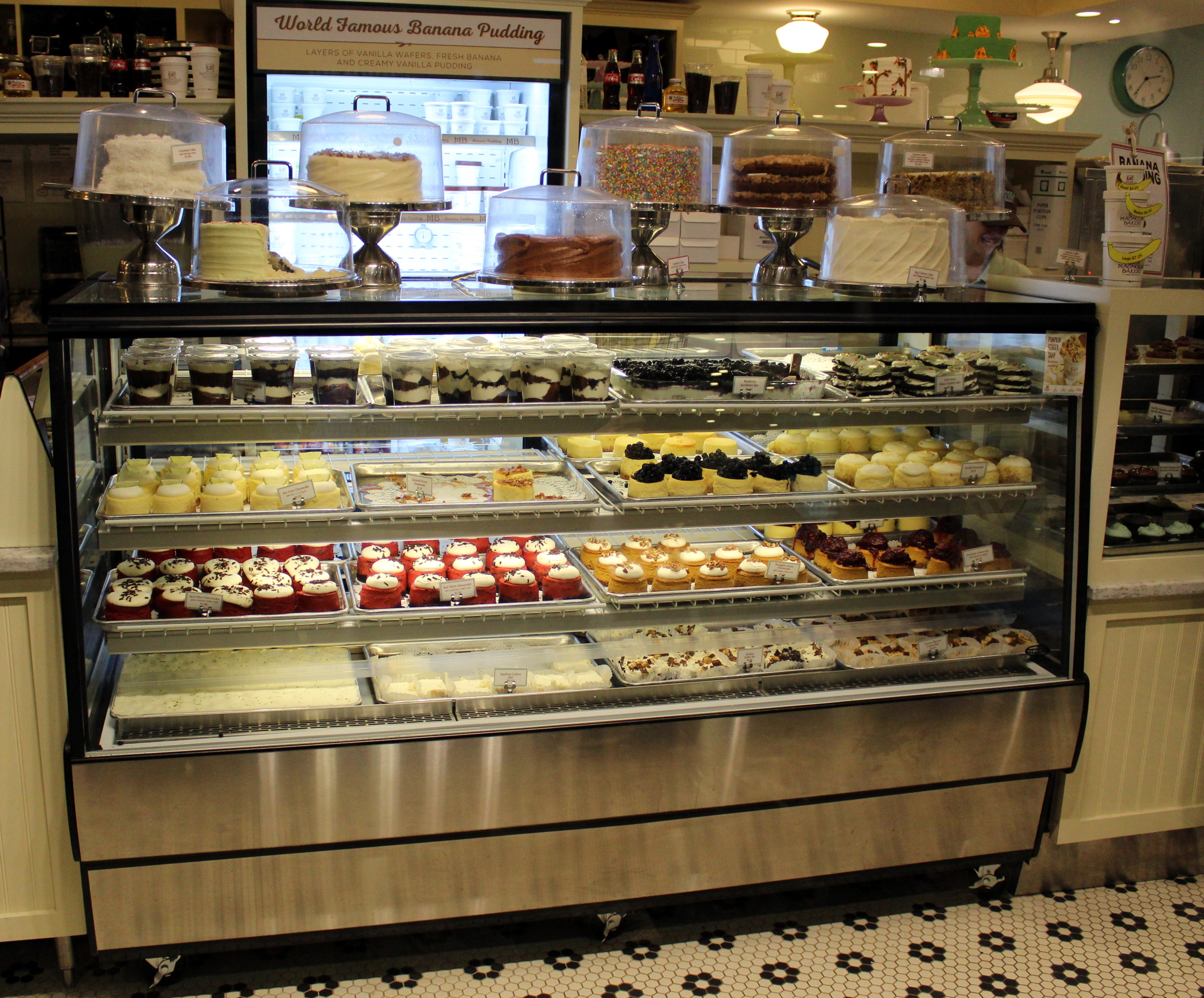
Magnolia Bakery at Union Station in Washington, D.C. (2018)

Magnolia Bakery has expanded from its original location with additional stores in the U.S. and internationally. In 2011, Magnolia Bakery CEO Steve Abrams stated that he had plans to open approximately three stores a year, adding that he would work with franchisees to expand overseas.

The company's U.S. locations include stores in New York City, Boston, Chicago, Los Angeles, and Washington, DC. A franchise in Honolulu that featured Magnolia's first sit-down, full-service restaurant in the U.S. closed on October 27, 2018.

Magnolia Bakery's first non-U.S. store opened in Dubai in 2010, with two additional franchises opening in Dubai and one in Abu Dhabi. Other international franchises are currently operating in Saudi Arabia, which has eight locations as of October 2020; Qatar, which has four locations; Amman, Jordan; Daegu, South Korea; Taguig, Philippines (where it is known as M Bakery); and Mexico City, Mexico. A store also opened in Moscow, but then closed on July 1, 2016.

In May 2018, CEO Steve Abrams announced the launch of up to 200 new Magnolia stores across the United States. The company also planned to open branches in Manila and Sao Paulo.

While the location in Manila opened later that year under the localized name "M Bakery", the planned 200-store domestic rollout did not materialize within the projected timeframe. Magnolia launched its first outlet in India in November 2019 in the city of Bangalore.

The expansion stall was accelerated by the onset of the COVID-19 pandemic, leading the brand to shift its focus toward e-commerce and direct-to-consumer digital channels.

The chain restarted a domestic franchising program in 2026, aiming to expand beyond its traditional corporate hubs of New York City, Chicago, and Los Angeles. The first domestic franchise store under this new model opened in Salt Lake City, Utah, with subsequent regional development agreements signed for markets including Louisville, Kentucky, and Staten Island, New York.
