= Garcia v. Google, Inc. =

Legal case

- Court: United States Court of Appeals for the Ninth Circuit
- Citation: 786 F.3d 733

Case history
- Appealed from: District Court

Garcia v. Google, Inc., 786 F.3d 733 (9th Cir. 2015), is an ongoing dispute that arose when Cindy Lee Garcia sued Google and its video-sharing website, YouTube, to have the controversial film, Innocence of Muslims, taken down from the site. A California district court denied Garcia's motion for preliminary injunction, but, on appeal, a panel of the United States Court of Appeals for the Ninth Circuit reversed the lower court's decision, ordered YouTube to take down all copies of Innocence of Muslims, and remanded the case to the district court for reconsideration. In May 2015, in an en banc opinion, the Ninth Circuit reversed the panel's decision, vacating the order for the preliminary injunction.

== Background ==
=== Garcia's participation in the film ===
In July 2011, Garcia auditioned for a film by writer and producer Mark Basseley Youssef, also known as Nakoula Basseley Nakoula, with the working title Desert Warrior. A casting call described the film as "an HD 24P historical Arabian Desert adventure film," and Garcia was ultimately cast to play a minor role, that of a mother of a young woman who had been promised in marriage to the movie's protagonist. Garcia participated in three and one-half days of shooting and was paid $500 for her work.

=== International reaction to Innocence of Muslims ===
Ultimately, Youssef used the footage from Desert Warrior to create the controversial anti-Islamic film, Innocence of Muslims. He added the anti-Islamic content to the film by dubbing over the actors' lines without their knowledge. In particular, Youssef had partially dubbed one of Garcia's lines in order to have her character ask, "Is your Mohammed a child molester?" Innocence of Muslims screened at the Vine Theater in Los Angeles, California and was uploaded to YouTube on July 1, 2012. By September, Youssef had translated the film into Arabic and drew the attention of the Arabic-speaking world.

An Egyptian cleric issued a fatwa, condemning all involved with the film to death. On September 11, 2012, a series of protests began in response to a YouTube trailer for Innocence of Muslims. While the protests began at the diplomatic mission in Cairo, Egypt, unrest quickly spread to several other countries with significant Muslim populations, including Yemen, Greece, Sudan, Tunisia, India, Indonesia, and Pakistan. Garcia herself received death threats due to her involvement with the film.

== Lawsuit ==
=== District Court ===
Garcia asked Google to take down the film from YouTube on eight occasions pursuant to the Digital Millennium Copyright Act. After Google declined, Garcia sued the company on September 26, 2012, in federal district court in California. She claimed that the film's continued existence on YouTube violated her copyright interest in her performance in the film. She applied to the court for a temporary restraining order to force Google to take down the film.

The district court treated Garcia's application for a temporary restraining order as an application for a preliminary injunction. To succeed on a claim for preliminary injunction, Garcia had to show four factors: a likelihood that she would succeed on the merits of the copyright claim, the likelihood that irreparable harm will result if the court does not grant the injunction, and the balance of the equity to the parties and the public interest in granting or denying relief. The court denied the application "because Garcia had delayed in bringing the action, had failed to demonstrate 'that the requested preliminary relief would prevent any alleged harm' and was unlikely to succeed on the merits because she'd granted Youssef an implied license to use her performance in the film."

In a declaration given by David Hardy, president of DMCA Solutions, YouTube's typical notice-and-counter-notice process is described. Hardy then shares his conversations with YouTube over the Innocence of Muslims video and characterizes YouTube's responses as purposeful delay tactics and feigning ignorance on copyright law

=== U.S. Court of Appeals for the Ninth Circuit ===
The Ninth Circuit reversed the district court's decision denying Garcia a preliminary injunction, forcing Google to take down all copies of Innocence of Muslims from YouTube. The Ninth Circuit also remanded the case for retrial on the merits of Garcia's copyright claim.

==== Ninth Circuit opinion ====
The Ninth Circuit held that Garcia was entitled to a preliminary injunction because she was likely to succeed on the merits of her copyright claim. The court determined that Garcia likely owned an independent, copyrightable interest in her own performance in the film. Specifically, the court explained that Garcia's performance was "fixed" and that her "body language, facial expression and reactions to other actors and elements of a scene" constituted sufficient originality, both requirements of the Copyright Act of 1976. Further, the court concluded that Garcia never intended to be a "joint author," so Youssef had no co-ownership of her performance in the film.

Additionally, the court determined that Garcia was not an "employee" for purposes of transferring her ownership interest in her performance under the Copyright Act. The court pointed out that the term "employee" refers "to a hired party in a conventional employer relationship." According to the court, because "Youssef hired Garcia for a specific task, she only worked for three days and she claims she received no health or other traditional employment benefits" suggests that she was not an "employee" under the statute. Garcia never transferred her interest in writing, either.

On November 12, 2014, the full Ninth Circuit voted to rehear the case en banc. As part of that order, the court vacated its prior opinion, meaning that it can no longer be cited and is not binding on lower courts. The order has no effect on the injunction, meaning that Google still may not post the allegedly infringing portions of the film, at least for the time being.

In May 2015, in an en banc opinion, the Ninth Circuit reversed the panel's decision, vacating the order for the preliminary injunction.

== Reactions ==
=== Criticism ===
Prior to its reversal in an en banc opinion, the Ninth Circuit's decision sparked criticism from the legal community, as well as those who produce, distribute, or host copyrighted content.

The Electronic Frontier Foundation ("EFF") has criticized the court's decision for several reasons. First, "the Copyright Office expressly rejected [Garcia's] effort to register a copyright," suggesting that her claim is "doubtful at best." Second, the EFF argues that the court's decision amounts to a "prior restraint of speech, something that should never happen when the claim is 'doubtful.'" Even worse, the EFF argues, the decision may signal that any party who has added "anything even remotely creative to a work" may have the right to receive a share in the profits of that work, and he or she may have the power to remove that work from circulation.

Clark D. Asay, associate professor of law at Brigham Young University, reiterates some of the EFF's concerns. He suggests that the Ninth Circuit's decision could lead to censorship, wherein a small contributor to a creative work can effectively close off public access to the work. He also argues that the decision undercuts the utilitarian purpose of copyright law.

Stefan M. Mentzer, a partner at White & Case, LLP, argues that the court misinterpreted certain provisions of the Copyright Act.

=== Flynn v. Google ===
In September 2014, Gaylor Flynn, another actor who appeared in Innocence of Muslims, sued Google in the U.S. District Court for the Central District of California alleging copyright infringement.

== Other sources ==
- "Innocence of Muslims actor sues Google to block controversial film". The Guardian. September 15, 2014. Archived from the original on October 8, 2014.
- Willon, Phil; Keegan, Rebecca (September 13, 2012). "'Innocence of Muslims' unrest". Timeline. Los Angeles Times.
