= Rahmati =

Rahmati is a Persian surname that may refer to

- Amir Rahmati (born 1989), Iranian academic
- Bashir Ahmad Rahmati (born 1985), Afghan wrestler
- Kianoush Rahmati (born 1978), Iranian football player and coach
- Mahmoud Ghaed Rahmati (born 1991), Iranian football midfielder
- Mehdi Rahmati (born 1983), Iranian football goalkeeper
- Mohammad Alipour Rahmati (born 1962), Iranian politician
- Mohammad Rahmati Sirjani (born 1928), Iranian Twelver
- Nader Rahmati (born 1966), Iranian wrestler
- Sayed Anwar Rahmati, Afghan politician

== See also ==
- Ramati
