= Summit Entertainment =

American film production and distribution company

- Logo used since 2018
- Formerly: The Summit Group (1990-1994)
- Type: Subsidiary
- Industry: Film
- Founded: October 25, 1990; 36 years ago
- Founders: Bernd Eichinger; Arnon Milchan; Andrew G. Vajna
- Headquarters: Burbank, California (1990–2007); Universal City, California (2007–12); Santa Monica, California (2012–present)
- Key people: Patrick Wachsberger; Bob Hayward
- Products: Motion pictures
- Services: Film distribution (previous); Film production (current)
- Parent: Lionsgate Films (2012–present)
- Divisions: Summit Records; Summit Premiere
- Subsidiaries: International Distribution Company, LLC (joint venture with Pedro Rodriguez)

Summit Entertainment is an American film production and distribution company, founded on October 25, 1990. The studio currently serves as a label of Lionsgate Films and is best known for Step Up and The Twilight Saga film series.

== History ==
=== Independent era (1990–2012) ===
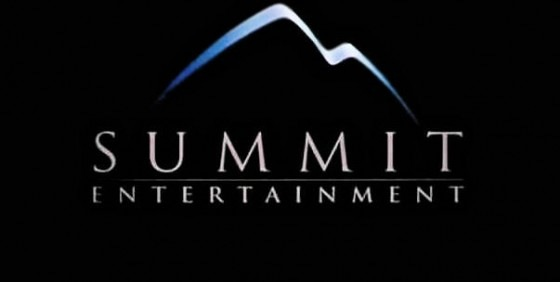
The company's original logo, used from 1994 to 2007

Summit Entertainment was founded in 1990 as the Summit Group by film producers Bernd Eichinger (Constantin Film), Arnon Milchan (Regency Enterprises), and Andrew G. Vajna (Carolco Pictures and Cinergi Pictures) to handle film sales in foreign countries. In late 1992, Patrick Wachsberger had joined the company, following his run from Odyssey Entertainment.

Summit officially relaunched in 1994 by David Garrett, Patrick Wachsberger, and Bob Hayward under the name Summit Entertainment LP as a distribution and sales organization after Wachsberger had bought out its stake from its partners, while continuing to sell exclusive rights to Constantin Film and Cinergi's films oveseas and handle foreign TV rights of its films by Regency Enterprises.

By 1995 they were producing and co-financing films, and by 1997 they started fully financing films, as well as striking international deals with companies like Mandalay Pictures, Artisan Entertainment, Newmarket Films, Escape Artists and Franchise Pictures.

Among the company's early successes were American Pie, Donnie Brasco, Fear and Loathing in Las Vegas, Memento, Requiem For A Dream, Die Hard With A Vengeance, The Blair Witch Project, and Lock, Stock and Two Smoking Barrels. In 1998, Summit acquired worldwide distribution rights to the entire filmography of Wim Wenders, including the then-upcoming Buena Vista Social Club, from Road Movies Filmproduktion; the deal however excluded The End of Violence, retained by Metro-Goldwyn-Mayer and Ciby 2000.

In 2006, it became an independent film studio with over a billion dollars in financing backed by Merrill Lynch. In 2007, the company signed a deal with Entertainment One to release films internationally. Starting in 2008, Summit Entertainment movies on Home Video are distributed by Universal Studios Home Entertainment.

In November 2008, Summit found massive success with the release of Twilight, a teen romance about vampires based on the best-selling book of the same name by Stephenie Meyer that made $408,773,703 worldwide. In the spring of 2009, Summit released Knowing, the company's second movie to open #1 at the box office and made $182,492,056 worldwide.

In 2009, the company had signed a financing deal with Participant Media in order to co-finance movies between the studio and Participant.

In November 2009, Summit released the sequel to Twilight titled The Twilight Saga: New Moon, also based on the popular novel by Stephenie Meyer, breaking box office records for first weekend grosses at the time, taking in $142,839,137 in the first three days. In June 2010 Summit released the third film of the Twilight series, The Twilight Saga: Eclipse. It broke a midnight screening record of over $30 million and set a one-day Wednesday record of $68.5 million. It became the first movie in the series to cross the $300 million mark domestically. Collectively, the franchise grossed $3.3 billion globally.

In 2008, Summit Entertainment ranked in eighth place among the studios, with a gross of $226.5 million, almost entirely because of the release of Twilight. In 2009, Summit ranked 7th among studios with a gross of $482.5 million.

Other Summit Entertainment releases include: Ender's Game (released November 1, 2013 in the United States; an adaptation of Orson Scott Card's 1985 novel); Mr. & Mrs. Smith ($186,330,000 US box office); The Hurt Locker ($16,400,000 US box office; it garnered Summit its first Best Picture Oscar); La La Land ($151,100,000 US box office); Step Up Franchise ($651,000,00 Global box office); Now You See Me ($117,700,000 US box office); the low-budget Push ($31,811,527 US box office); Deepwater Horizon ($61,400,000 US box office); the sleeper hit, RED ($87,940,198 US box office; nominated for a 2010 Golden Globe in the Best Motion Picture – Comedy or Musical category); Vanilla Sky ($100,618344 US box office); and most recently the popular John Wick Franchise ($1,011,000,000 grossed globally across the four films).

=== Lionsgate era (2012–present) ===
On February 1, 2009, it was announced that Lionsgate would acquire Summit Entertainment, along with its library of six films and rights to the Twilight franchise, but two days later, these merger negotiations broke down due to concerns over changing content. On January 13, 2012, Lionsgate officially acquired Summit Entertainment for $412.5 million. Lionsgate continues to operate Summit Entertainment as a label.

== See also ==
- Lionsgate Films
- Lionsgate Studios
- Smith v. Summit Entertainment LLC
