= Reply girl =

Female YouTube user uploading video responses

A reply girl was a type of female YouTube user who uploaded video responses to popular YouTube videos, at a time when such responses were displayed prominently by the site, causing controversy throughout 2012.

In 2007, creators of qualifying videos with high viewing numbers began earning money. Seeking to attract viewers, a reply girl would upload a clip of herself making brief, and sometimes irrelevant, comments about a popular video, often with the title Re: [Name of the original video], and usually with a thumbnail in which her chest was exposed partially. While the trend was popular initially, it garnered gradual disapproval, prompting many visitors to ignore the videos until the reply practice faded.

== Algorithm ==
In 2012, YouTube gave significant weight to video responses when suggesting further viewing for any given video, putting them "almost automatically" at the top of the list. Users known as "reply girls" realised that by responding to popular videos, such as those featured on the YouTube home page, their own content could receive a significant audience. By selecting a suggestive thumbnail for the response, often filmed in a push-up bra or low-cut top, posters could encourage viewers to click the image and view the video. Although many users would click the "dislike" button on the videos, this was interpreted by YouTube's algorithm as legitimate engagement, and the videos would be ranked more highly.

Prior to YouTube and social media, companies were promoting their products through the television, radio, or newspaper. The abuse of YouTube's algorithm through the use of "sexually suggestive thumbnails" would allow for the monetization of the reply girl's content. The YouTube algorithm would be utilized by companies to detect which influencer would attract a larger audience.

== History and dispute ==
With YouTube rewarding users for large numbers of video views, reply girls were able to earn significant income by exploiting this aspect of the website. Alejandra Gaitan was thought to be earning around a hundred dollars for each of the "short, rambling [and] usually pointless" videos that she posted, with some of the more popular ones raising close to a thousand. Gaitan's username for her channel was "thereplygirl" and her videos were formatted as Re: [Title of trending video] which would result in her video having priority because the previous YouTube algorithm would suggest videos that were correlated or similar to the previous video watched by the viewer. Megan Lee Heart, whose YouTube channel reached 38,000 subscribers and had over 47 million views at the time, made tens of thousands of dollars, claiming to have made $80,000 on her channel-page description. Heart, who uploaded her Pointless Reviews under the username "MeganSpeaks", included thumbnails featuring bright arrows pointing toward her chest. Heart stated she began the series not to attract views, but to mock Gaitan. Like Gaitan, Heart also attracted controversy on YouTube, but stated that Pointless Reviews was "kind of trolling".

Some female followers of Gaitan began to acknowledge the profits that she would receive and sought to emulate her success. Being a reply girl became known as an easier way to make money on YouTube, because clickbait became prominent amongst creators who were aspiring to increase the monetary value of their videos. Although the video would most likely be clicked on, viewers had a tendency to leave at an earlier time due to the lack of correlation between the video and title, or the fact that the video would address the title after an excess amount of time. Reply girls would also exploit the algorithm that focused on view count by attracting viewers through provocative thumbnails.

In response to Gaitan and others manipulating the YouTube algorithm, YouTube users uploaded "anti-reply girl" videos in protest of the perceived low quality but high quantity of videos posted by reply girls. Male YouTube users would make a mockery of the reply girls by exposing their chests as well, and expressing their distaste towards the content being produced. The revolt addressed the spamming of the platform, along with the claim that creators who were producing original content were being neglected by the YouTube algorithm.

In March 2012, YouTube updated its algorithm to recommend fewer videos which were only watched briefly by users, announcing that the site would be "focusing more prominently on time watched". Gaitan expressed concern that this would "kill almost every reply channel", despite that being the stated intention of the action. YouTube previously wanted to base the value off of view count because they believed it would "reward great videos" and although this was true to some extent, it excluded a variety of factors.
