= YouTube VR =

YouTube interface for VR headsets

- Developer: YouTube
- Release: November 9, 2016
- Stable release: 1.60.19 / November 6, 2024
- Operating system: Android (Linux)
- Platform: Meta Horizon OS (2018-present); Google Daydream (2016-2020)
- License: Proprietary

YouTube VR is a software application which offers an interface for YouTube made for VR headsets.

== Features ==
YouTube VR allows for access to all YouTube-hosted videos, but particularly supports headset access for 360° and 180°-degree video (both in 2D and stereoscopic 3D). The interface shows videos behind two floating panels, with the video description and comments showing on the left panel and related videos or playlists showing on the right panel. Since September 2023, the app interface allows for both immersive and 2D panel modes. The immersive mode retains a surrounding virtual background, while the 2D panel mode allows for use in augmented reality passthrough. The interface is accessible with hand tracking.

=== Support for 3D and 360 video ===
Since 2009, viewers have had the ability to watch 3D videos. In 2015, YouTube began natively supporting 360-degree video. Since April 2016, it allowed live streaming 360° video, and both normal and 360° video at up to 1440p, and since November 2016 both at up to 4K (2160p) resolution. Citing the limited number of users who watched more than 90-degrees, it began supporting an alternative stereoscopic video format known as VR180 which it said was easier to produce, which allows users to watch any video using virtual reality headsets.

== History ==
=== Releases ===
In November 2016, YouTube released YouTube VR, a dedicated version with an interface for VR devices, for Google's Daydream mobile VR platform on Android. In December 2017, the app was released on Steam for HTC Vive. In November 2018, YouTube VR was released on the Oculus Store for the Oculus Go headset. YouTube VR was updated since for compatibility with successive Quest devices, and was ported to Pico 4.

Starting with the Oculus Quest, the app was updated for compatibility with mixed-reality passthrough modes on VR headsets. In April 2024, YouTube VR was updated to support 8K SDR video on Meta Quest 3.

Prior to the release of the Apple Vision Pro in February 2024, YouTube announced that neither YouTube VR nor YouTube's iPadOS app would be ported to visionOS upon the launch of the headset, and suggested that Vision Pro use a web browser to access YouTube videos in-headset. However, the company later clarified that native support on visionOS was "on the roadmap".

=== Release history ===
Version	Date	Notes	Ref.
1.00.00	November 9, 2016	Released on Android for Google Daydream headsets	
1.00.01	December 13, 2016		
1.01.71	February 2, 2017	first to support Daydream on Android Nougat (7.0)	
1.01.75	March 1, 2017		
1.02.55	April 7, 2017		
1.03.61	May 30, 2017		
1.04.19	June 19, 2017		
1.04.20	July 6, 2017		
1.05.31	July 20, 2017		
1.06.26	August 16, 2017		
1.07.53	September 19, 2017		
1.08.39	October 11, 2017		
1.09.50	November 7, 2017		
1.10.60	December 13, 2017	first release to support HTC Vive	
1.10.63	January 16, 2018		
1.11.98	March 12, 2018		
1.12.83	May 10, 2018		
1.13.91	July 31, 2018		
1.14.53	September 10, 2018		
1.15.57	November 9, 2018	first to support Oculus Go	
1.17.53	February 20, 2019		
1.18.49	May 3, 2019		
1.19.48	June 28, 2019	support for Brand Accounts (Oculus); first update for Oculus Quest	
1.19.60	July 10, 2019	Updated app launcher icon to show up in the Android apps list (Daydream); Changed screen dragging to drag relative to the cursor (Daydream); Enabled screen resizing while dragging (Daydream)	
1.19.61	July 15, 2019		
1.20.50	August 5, 2019	onboarding tooltips added	
1.21.24	September 12, 2019		
1.21.50	September 10, 2019	passthrough support for Lenovo Mirage Solo devices (Daydream)	
1.22.54	November 5, 2019		
1.23.53	December 19, 2019	haptic feedback to buttons (Oculus)	
1.24.50	March 4, 2020		
1.26.53	May 18, 2020	Support for up to 4K playback of 2D videos (Oculus); Support for 72Hz mode (Oculus)	
1.27.53	July 23, 2020	Movies destination tab launched for signed in users	
1.28.63	October 6, 2020	Final update for Google Daydream	
1.28.68	November 13, 2020		
1.29.71	December 10, 2020	hand tracking support	
1.30.46	February 22, 2021		
1.31.41	April 26, 2021	video seek features; updates to UI	
1.32.31	May 6, 2021		
1.34.25	July 26, 2021		
1.35.30	September 16, 2021	comments made visible	
1.36.23	October 26, 2021		
1.37.37	November 16, 2021	Search filters; Updated video quality selection settings; Updated UI on home and browse pages to dark mode; bug fixes	
1.37.43	December 6, 2021		
1.38.64	February 22, 2022		
1.39.28	April 28, 2022	Bug fixes and comment improvements	
1.40.51	June 22, 2022		
1.41.38	September 7, 2022		
1.42.32	October 19, 2022	new shelf for Shows; UI indicators when using controller seek controls	
1.42.33	November 11, 2022		
1.43.32	November 16, 2022		
1.44.47	January 24, 2023		
1.44.48	February 15, 2023		
1.45.31	March 20, 2023	Support for OpenXR	
1.45.32	April 12, 2023		
1.46.09	April 27, 2023		
1.47.42	May 24, 2023		
1.47.43	June 26, 2023		
1.47.44	July 6, 2023	Movies tab bug fixes	
1.47.48	July 19, 2023		
1.48.35	July 28, 2023	new accounts page; environments auto mode; environment switcher button	
1.48.36	August 10, 2023		
1.49.27	August 18, 2023	Enabled YT experimental features for "Enter Panel Mode"	
1.49.28	August 28, 2023		
1.50.26	September 28, 2023	ability to switch between Immersive and 2D Panel Mode	
1.50.27	October 26, 2023		
1.51.37	November 14, 2023		
1.51.38	November 16, 2023		
1.52.15	December 18, 2023		
1.53.27	January 19, 2023		
1.54.20	February 28, 2024	Support for 8K (4320p or 4320p60) SDR video on Meta Quest 3	
1.54.21	March 7, 2024		
1.55.23	April 2, 2024		
1.56.21	April 25, 2024		
1.57.29	May 23, 2024		
1.58.14	June 13, 2024		
1.59.56	September 13, 2024		
1.60.17	September 26, 2024		
1.60.18	October 9, 2024		
1.60.19	November 6, 2024	Support for co-watching YouTube videos, including 2D videos in 8K, full movies in 4K, and YouTube Shorts, with up to seven mutual Horizon Home friends, whether in Horizon Home or in mixed reality mode. Paid content only viewable to those who have paid for said content.	
