= Ramati =

Ramati is a surname. Notable people with the surname include:

- Alexander Ramati (1921–2006), Polish writer and film director
- Roman Haubenstock-Ramati (1919–1994), Polish-Austrian composer and music editor

== See also ==
- Rahmati
