= Lazy Sunday (The Lonely Island song) =

2005 song performed by The Lonely Island

Single by The Lonely Island and Chris Parnell

from the album Incredibad
- Released: December 17, 2005
- Recorded: December 13, 2005 at the offices of The Lonely Island and Saturday Night Live, GE Building, New York City
- Genre: Comedy hip hop; nerdcore
- Length: 2:22
- Label: Universal Republic
- Songwriters: Andy Samberg; Akiva Schaffer; Jorma Taccone
- Producer: Jorma Taccone

The Lonely Island and Chris Parnell singles chronology
""Sax Man""	"Lazy Sunday"	""Normal Guy""

Music video
- "Lazy Sunday" on YouTube

"Lazy Sunday" (sometimes "The Chronic of Narnia rap", "The Chronicles of Narnia rap" or "The Narnia rap") is a single and short film by American comedy troupe The Lonely Island. It was released on December 17, 2005, when it premiered on episode nine, season 31 of Saturday Night Live as the troupe's second Digital Short. Primarily performed by Andy Samberg and fellow cast member Chris Parnell, the song and accompanying music video follow the two comedians as they eat cupcakes from the Magnolia Bakery, buy snacks at a convenience store, and smuggle the food into a Sunday afternoon matinee of The Chronicles of Narnia.

The song was written in one night by Samberg and Parnell, as well as Lonely Island members Akiva Schaffer and Jorma Taccone. They recorded the following night in the comedy troupe's office and shot the music video around Manhattan two days later using a borrowed camera. After being quickly mixed and edited by Schaffer, the short was approved for broadcast on the next evening's telecast of Saturday Night Live by producer Lorne Michaels.

Although the writers initially worried the studio audience would respond to the short negatively, the short received a positive reception and enjoyed Internet stardom overnight, with multiple bootleg copies surfacing on video-sharing website YouTube, catapulting the awareness of the then-fledgling website. The song and short brought forth positive critical reception, with many hailing it as a revival for the stagnant series. Commentators have named "Lazy Sunday" as one of the best Saturday Night Live moments of the 2000s.

== Background ==
The track "Lazy Sunday" and its accompanying music video follow the two cast members (Parnell and Samberg), who adopt the brash personas of hardcore rappers. The song follows their quest to achieve their "ultimate goal" of attending a matinee of the fantasy film The Chronicles of Narnia: The Lion, the Witch and the Wardrobe. The lyrics involve subjects that are "anything but hardcore," such as eating cupcakes from the Magnolia Bakery, searching for travel directions on MapQuest and buying tickets with $10 bills. Samberg described the lyrics as "two guys rapping about very lame, sensitive stuff."

Schaffer and Taccone had been on the writing staff for nearly three months, yet to this point only two live sketches of theirs had survived the dress rehearsal process to be broadcast.

== Recording and production ==
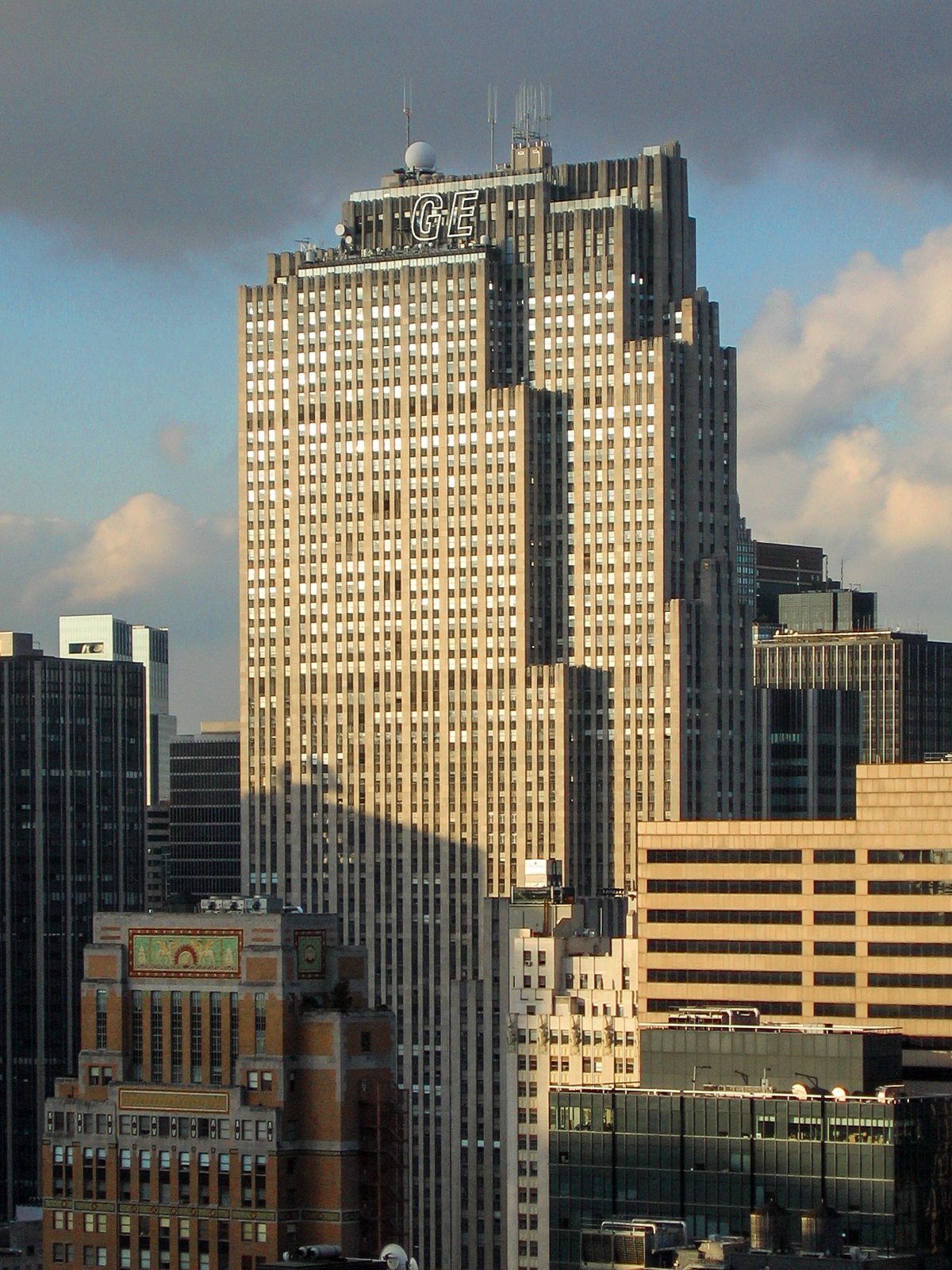
The song was recorded in one night on Taccone's laptop in the offices of Saturday Night Live in the GE Building.

Parnell, Samberg, Schaffer, and Taccone wrote "Lazy Sunday" on the evening of December 12, 2005. They recorded the following night in the office The Lonely Island occupied together using a laptop Taccone bought on Craigslist. While colleagues were rehearsing and rewriting that Saturday's show, the group spent the morning of December 15 shooting their video with a borrowed camera. The video used the Upright Citizens Brigade Theater in Chelsea to stand in for a multiplex cinema. Comic Emily Heller, the sister of co-writer Taccone's girlfriend, plays a convenience store clerk.

Schaffer worked the next night into the morning, editing the video and working with technicians to improve the recording to broadcast standards. In the moments preceding the show's live performance and broadcast, the team learned from Lorne Michaels that "Lazy Sunday" would be shown on that night's show. The three comedians were very worried about how the video would be received by the studio audience.

== Release ==
The short had its premiere on Saturday Night Live (season 31, episode 9) and received positive responses. "It played really well, and we were just super happy about that," said Samberg. The video aired during the actor's first season on the show, when he and the comedy troupe were little known to even Saturday Night Live's most devout fans; Samberg reported that the video greatly increased his recognizability "overnight". "It captures a certain scrappiness about the show. There's an unpolished realness to it that I think people can instantly relate to," said Saturday Night Live veteran Amy Poehler. By the following morning, the video was a national cultural sensation. Schaffer and Taccone were contacted by friends who heard the track played on radio stations and in bars and it inspired a line of T-shirts, released during the initial boom of popularity in the weeks after its release. Fellow SNL performer Bill Hader, speaking about the event in 2019 on Conan O'Brien's podcast, recalled Samberg receiving an applause break the following week when appearing in a sketch. Hader recalled, "None of us were angry or jealous but it was more of an envious [feeling], just 'wow, did you see that?' We'd never been that close to a thing that was a phenomenon." The success of "Lazy Sunday" encouraged Michaels to trust the troupe more and to encourage their material's presence in the show.

The short was initially available after its broadcast through the iTunes Store (then known as the iTunes Music Store), made free for subscribers. Additionally, it was posted to several websites and shared via e-mail by fans. The unofficial uploads of the video went viral and were cumulatively watched more than five million times on YouTube. The clips were removed in February 2006, when NBC Universal asked the site to remove all copies, along with several other copyrighted NBC video clips. YouTube at that time was a startup website that appeared to be aimed for video creators, but by February 2006, due to "Lazy Sunday", established itself as a home for any type of video sharing. YouTube would later that year be purchased by Google for US$1.65 billion.

NBC later placed the short on its website and partnered streaming platforms. In August 2013, the official Saturday Night Live YouTube channel uploaded "Lazy Sunday".

=== Reception ===
Entertainment Weekly placed the video on its end-of-the-decade "best-of" list, saying, "the hallowed genre of 'white dudes rapping about mundane stuff' reached new heights of hilarity with Andy Samberg and Chris Parnell's 2005 ode to an afternoon viewing of The Chronic—what!—cles of Narnia." Business Insider included it on its list of "videos that changed YouTube forever."

== Sequel ==
On May 19, 2012, Samberg and Parnell collaborated on "Lazy Sunday 2", which begins similarly to its predecessor and uses more modern references such as Siri, and seeing Sister Act on Broadway instead of Narnia. However, in the middle of the song, it changes genres to a darker dubstep mafioso rap song. Samberg used "Lazy Sunday 2" to bring a close to his time on SNL, with the final lines referring to how "Lazy Sunday" had been the opening chapter of his celebrity, and the sequel was how he would end his tenure on the TV show.

== Cultural influence ==
The 2005 rap ... has been credited with reenergizing SNL. But more importantly, it introduced YouTube as a place to watch and (even more importantly) share comedy. It's hard to believe, considering we live in a world in which a Hannibal Burress bit about Bill Cosby, captured by a cell phone in a small club and shared online, can spark a revolution. But in 2005, that kind of thing was unheard-of.

— Mickey Rapkin, Men's Journal

"Lazy Sunday" is considered to have helped turn around Saturday Night Live's declining performance prior to 2005. Thanks to "Lazy Sunday"'s initial iTunes success, Apple announced they had licensed several archived Saturday Night Live sketches to offer for download in January 2006.

The viral success of the video is widely credited as having been the tipping-point for YouTube's success. The video-hosting site had gone online five months earlier, in July 2005. The rap video was the first television clip to go viral on the site, and in the week of its upload, the website traffic went up 83 percent.

The video also spawned dozens of response videos, including a West Coast response by actor Mark Feuerstein, an English response by comedian Sam Baron, an Australian response about lawn bowls, a song that defended the honor of the Midwest called "Lazy Muncie," and "Lazy Ramadi," a song by two US Army soldiers based in Ramadi, Iraq. In "The Merger", an episode of the television series The Office, Michael Scott makes an orientation film "Lazy Scranton" for employees who were transferred to Scranton. Starring Michael and Dwight, the video uses the same music, rap style, and camera effects used in the "Lazy Sunday" video. In the feature film Epic Movie, the character Captain Jack Swallows (a reference to Jack Sparrow from the Pirates of the Caribbean film franchise) breaks out in a rap called "Lazy Pirate Day"; the song is reminiscent of "Lazy Sunday" both visually and musically. Swallows is played by Darrell Hammond, a long-time performer on Saturday Night Live.

== See also ==
- SNL Digital Shorts
