= Amir Rahmati =

Iranian American computer scientist

- امیر رحمتی
- Born: c. July 1989 (age 37); Bradford, United Kingdom
- Citizenship: Iranian American
- Education: University of Michigan
- Scientific career
- Fields: Computer science
- Workplaces: Stony Brook University
- Thesis: [University of Michigan Library Attacking and Defending Emerging Computer Systems Using the Memory Remanence Effect] (2017)
- Doctoral advisor: Atul Prakash
- Website: Amir Rahmati homepage

Amir Rahmati (born c. July 1989) is an assistant professor of computer science at Stony Brook University, where he also directs the Ethos Security and Privacy lab. Rahmati's research focuses on computer security and privacy, with an emphasis on problems that broadly impact emerging technologies. He is a senior member of the National Academy of Inventors and IEEE.

== Education ==
Rahmati was awarded the B.Sc. in Computer Engineering from Sharif University of Technology in 2011, and the M.S.E. and Ph.D. in Computer Science and Engineering from the University of Michigan in 2014, and 2017, respectively.

== Career ==
As a graduate student, Rahmati developed various security mechanisms for embedded system and internet of things systems. In 2012, he developed A new technology called Time and Remanence Decay in SRAM (TARDIS) that used the predictable patterns in the decay of static RAM (SRAM) to create a short-duration clock. This enables RFID chips to detect potential security threats, particularly brute-force attacks, without requiring new hardware. In 2013, Rahmati and coauthors developed a new technology to detect malware on hospital devices by monitoring changes in their power consumption. The technology was later used by Virta Labs and deployed in two large US hospitals.

In 2018, Rahmati was part of the team that first demonstrated that adversarial examples against Machine learning models can be effective not only in digital environments but also in the physical world. The paper showed that by applying carefully designed perturbations—such as stickers or patterns—to real-world objects like stop signs, they could reliably fool state-of-the-art image classifiers under varying viewing conditions, including changes in angle, distance, and lighting. The Stop Sign used in the paper is now part of the Science Museum Group collection.

He joined Stony Brook University as an Assistant Professor in the Computer Science department in 2018.
