= Lazy Ramadi =

2006 parody

"Lazy Ramadi" is a 2006 spoof of the Saturday Night Live music video "Lazy Sunday", produced and played by two soldiers in the US Army Staff Sergeants Josh Dobbs and Matt Wright. Also appearing is Specialist Adam Foster (a.k.a. "punching bag") with music and sound by Specialist Andre Franklin. Inspired by the "Lazy Muncie" another response video to "Lazy Sunday", it is based in Ramadi, Iraq and touches on the life of soldiers stationed there.
