= Smith v. Summit Entertainment LLC =

Legal case

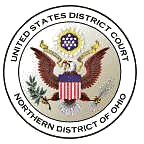
- Court: United States District Court for the Northern District of Ohio, Western Division
- Full case name: Matthew Smith v. Summit Entertainment LLC
- Decided: June 6, 2011
- Docket nos.: 3:11-cv-00348
- Citation: 2011 WL 2200599

Court membership
- Judge sitting: James G. Carr

Smith v. Summit Entertainment LLC, No. 3:11-cv-00348 (N.D. Ohio June 6, 2011), was a case heard by the United States District Court for the Northern District of Ohio, in which professional singer Matthew Smith, known as Matt Heart, sued Summit Entertainment. Smith asserted seven causes of action for Summit Entertainment's wrongful use of copyright takedown notice on the website YouTube, among which three were dismissed and four were ruled in Smith's favor. The case is noteworthy given that copyright 17 U.S.C. § 512 claims are hard to win, and the plaintiff's success was due to the combination of his persuasive story and convincing additional claims which complemented § 512.

== Facts ==
In November and December 2010, Smith uploaded his copyrighted song "Eternal Knight" to various Internet websites (YouTube, iTunes, CD Baby and Amazon). Summit Entertainment contacted YouTube to take down Smith's song, alleging that the song violated both trademark and copyright belonging to Summit. The song was then removed from the website. Smith later found out from Summit that the issue was one of trademark, not copyright, i.e. the song's CD cover violated Summit's trademarked "Twilight Saga". This was due to the song's cover art which stated that the song was "inspired by the twilight saga," even though Smith copyrighted the song in 2002, and used a similar typeface as in "twilight" mark. Summit notified Smith that he was free to "redeposit" his song on YouTube, provided he would remove references to the defendant's trademark. Later, Smith changed the cover art to display "A Vampire Love Story" instead of "Inspired by the Twilight Saga".

== Opinion of the Court ==
=== Causes of Action and Decision ===
Smith's complaint asserted seven causes of action:

1. Wrongful assertion that plaintiff's song infringed Summit's copyright in violation of 17 U.S.C. § 512;
2. Fraud via Summit's assertion that it had a copyright interest in plaintiff's song;
3. Intentional infliction of emotional distress;
4. Intentional interference in contractual relationships;
5. Intentional interference with business relationships;
6. Copyright infringement;
7. Defamation

The court granted the defendant's motion to dismiss Counts 2, 3, and 6, and ruled in the plaintiff's favor by denying the motion to dismiss for Counts 1, 4, 5, and 7.

==== Count 1: Wrongful Assertion of Copyright Violation ====
According to Copyright Act, 17 U.S.C. § 512, the plaintiff can seek damage only if the defendant knowingly misrepresented the takedown notice. The judge found that when the defendant originally sent the takedown notices for violation of copyright, the defendant made an "unquestionably false assertion". The fact that the defendant promptly, after-the-fact, acknowledged that takedown notice was for trademark, not copyright, did not matter. The defendant also argued that most websites only provided one form for copyright takedown and none for trademark, so it had to use the copyright form. The judge found this defense an improper consideration and thus ruled in the plaintiff's favor for defendant's wrongful assertion of copyright violation.

==== Count 2: Fraudulent Assertion of Copyright Interest ====
The plaintiff alleged that the defendant's statements to the websites were fraudulent. To demonstrate actionable fraud, the plaintiff must demonstrate that (1) the defendant knowingly made false statements, upon which it expected the plaintiff to rely, (2) the false statements must have been relied upon, and (3) injury to the relying party must have resulted from the reliance.

There were two possible candidates subject to injury here: the plaintiff and the websites. The plaintiff knew that he, and he alone, had a valid copyright in his song and could not plausibly rely on the false statements made by the defendant. This left only the websites as victims of fraud. The plaintiff, however, did not claim the websites suffered injury from relying on the false statements. Thus, the judge dismissed Count 2, plaintiff's assertion of fraud/misrepresentation.

==== Count 3: Intentional infliction of emotional distress ====
To prove the defendant caused infliction of emotional distress intentionally, the plaintiff must demonstrate that (1) the defendant intended to cause, or knew or should have known that his actions would result in serious emotional distress; (2) the defendant's conduct was so extreme and outrageous that it went beyond all possible bounds of decency and can be considered completely intolerable in a civilized community; (3) the defendant's actions proximately caused psychological injury to the plaintiff; and (4) the plaintiff suffered serious mental anguish of a nature no reasonable person could be expected to endure.

The plaintiff, however, did not allege that the defendant intended to cause, knew, or should have known its false assertion of a copyright infringement would cause serious emotional distress. The plaintiff also did not allege that he suffered "severe psychological injury". Even if the plaintiff had made such allegations in the complaint, there was no factual basis for such contentions. The judge therefore dismissed Count 3 of intentional infliction of emotional distress.

==== Count 4 & 5: Intentional interference in contractual relationships and business relationships ====
The plaintiff alleged that the defendant intentionally interfered in the contractual relationships between the plaintiff and the websites. To prove this claim, the plaintiff must demonstrate: (1) he had a contractual relationship with the websites; (2) the defendant's knowledge of such a relationship; (3) the defendant's intentional interference caused a breach or termination of the relationship; and (4) damages from the interference.

The judge found that the defendant adequately knew of the contractual relationship with the websites. Since the defendant sent a takedown notice, the whole purpose of which is to cause removal of the song from the websites, the defendant knew by sending such notices would lead to removal of the plaintiff's song from the websites. It was also easy to see the damages caused by this removal given the importance of unimpeded display of the song on the websites to the plaintiff. The judge thus ruled in the plaintiff's favor.

The plaintiff also alleged that the defendant intentionally interfered in the business relationships between the plaintiff and the websites. To prove such claim, the plaintiff must demonstrate elements similar to those of contractual relationships stated aforementioned. The judge thus reached the same conclusion for the same reasons with regard to both Count 4 and Count 5.

==== Count 6: Copyright infringement ====
The plaintiff alleged that "Defendant has breached the copyright." Nowhere in the complaint, however, contained any factual basis for making such assertion and the count was thus dismissed by the judge.

==== Count 7: Defamation ====
For the plaintiff to win the defamation claim, the plaintiff must prove that a false statement was made about the plaintiff and published without privilege to a third party with fault or at least negligence on the part of the defendant. He must also prove that the statement was either defamatory per se or caused special harm to the plaintiff.

Given the defendant made a false statement that the plaintiff's song violated the defendant's copyright when it had no such privilege, and the plaintiff suffered damages, the judge ruled in the plaintiff's favor.

== See also ==
- Lenz v. Universal Music Corp., another case of YouTube takedown notice misuse.
