= Stanley Wojcicki =

American physicist (1937–2023)

- Born: Stanisław Jerzy Wójcicki; March 30, 1937; Warsaw, Poland
- Died: May 31, 2023 (aged 86); Los Altos, California, U.S.
- Education: Harvard University (BA); University of California, Berkeley (MA, PhD)
- Spouse: Esther Hochman (m. 1962)
- Children: 3, including Susan and Anne
- Parents: Franciszek Wójcicki (father); Janina Wójcicka Hoskins (mother)
- Awards: Bruno Pontecorvo Prize (2011); Panofsky Prize (2015)
- Scientific career
- Workplaces: Stanford
- Thesis: Pion-Hyperon Resonances (1962)

Stanley George Wojcicki (/ˌvuːɪˈtʃɪtski/ VOO-ih-CHITS-kee; born Stanisław Jerzy Wójcicki, Polish: [vujˈt͡ɕit͡skʲi]; March 30, 1937 – May 31, 2023) was an American physicist and former chair of the physics department at Stanford University in California.

== Early life and education ==
Wojcicki was born in Warsaw, Poland, the son of Janina Wanda Wójcicka (née Kozłowska), a bibliographer, and Franciszek Wójcicki, a lawyer. He and his brother fled from Poland to Sweden with his mother at the age of 12, when communists came to power. They eventually arrived in the United States. His father remained in Poland, and was soon imprisoned for five years for being a member of the government's main opposition party. He was never able to gain a visa to come to the United States.

Wojcicki and his brother were sent to a boarding school run by the Franciscan Order near Buffalo, New York. He excelled in mathematics and had thought of pursuing either engineering or medicine, but decided to study physics. He attended Harvard University on a scholarship and graduated with a BA. He later attended the University of California, Berkeley, where he earned a PhD.

== Career ==
Wojcicki worked at the Lawrence Berkeley National Laboratory and was a National Science Foundation fellow at CERN and the Collège de France. In 1966, he joined the Stanford University physics faculty where he headed the Department of Physics from 1982–1985 and 2004–2007.

Wojcicki served as an advisor to government funding agencies (US and foreign) as well as to several high energy physics laboratories. He also headed the High Energy Physics Advisory Panel, which advises the United States Department of Energy and the National Science Foundation on particle physics matters.

Wojcicki led the HEPAP subpanel New Facilities for the US High-Energy Physics Program which recommended building the Super Conducting Super Collilder in 1983.

== Personal life ==
Stanley Wojcicki was the husband of fellow educator Esther Wojcicki, whom he met at UC Berkeley, and married in 1962. They had three children and ten grandchildren.

- Susan Wojcicki, former CEO of YouTube. Google's first office was started in her home.
- Janet Wojcicki, assistant professor of pediatrics at UCSF.
- Anne Wojcicki, founder and CEO of the genetic testing company 23andMe

In 2010, his daughter Anne and her then-husband, Google co-founder Sergey Brin, endowed a $2.5 million chair in experimental physics at Stanford in her father's name.

Wojcicki was a Catholic.

Wojcicki died at his residence in Los Altos, California, on May 31, 2023, at the age of 86.
