= Emrax 228 =

- Type: Electric aircraft engine
- National origin: Slovenia
- Manufacturer: Emrax

The Emrax 228 is a Slovenian electric motor for powering electric aircraft and other applications, designed and produced by Emrax d.o.o of Kamnik. The company was formerly called Enstroj and based in Radomlje.

== Design and development ==
The Emrax 228 is a brushless 130 volt design producing a peak of 100 kW (134 hp), 55 kW (74 hp) continuous, with an outrunner coil. It has a 98% efficiency. The low working rpm of the engine means that it can turn a propeller at efficient speeds without the need for a reduction drive.

== Specifications (Emrax 228) ==
Data from Tacke and manufacturer

=== General characteristics ===
- Type: Brushless electric aircraft engine
- Length: 86 mm (3.4 in)
- Diameter: 228 mm (9.0 in)
- Dry weight: 12 kg (26.5 lb)

=== Components ===
- Coil type: Outrunner
- Cooling system: air and/or liquid
- Reduction gear: none

=== Performance ===
- Power output: 100 kW (134 hp) peak, 55 kW (74 hp) continuous
- Voltage: 130V nominal
- Best efficiency: 98%
- Power-to-weight ratio: 8.3 kW/kg

== See also ==
Related lists

- List of aircraft engines
