= Franciszek Wójcicki =

Polish politician (1900–1983)

Member of the Sejm
- In office 1947–1952

Personal details
- Born: 27 January 1900 Piotrkowice, Congress Poland
- Died: 2 January 1983 (aged 82) Sopot, Polish People's Republic
- Party: People's Party (until 1945)
- Other political affiliations: Polish People's Party (1945–49)
- Spouse: Janina Kozłowska (m. 1931; div. 1960)
- Relations: Anne Wojcicki (granddaughter); Susan Wojcicki (granddaughter)
- Children: Stanley Wojcicki
- Education: University of Warsaw

Franciszek Wójcicki (27 January 1900 – 2 January 1983) was a Polish politician. He was a member of the People's Party and the Polish People's Party and was elected MP during the 1947 Polish legislative election.

His son's name was Stanisław by whom he had three granddaughters: Anne Wojcicki, founder and CEO of 23andMe; Susan Wojcicki, former CEO of YouTube; and Janet, an anthropologist and epidemiologist at the University of California, San Francisco.
