= Esther Wojcicki =

American journalist and educator (born 1940)

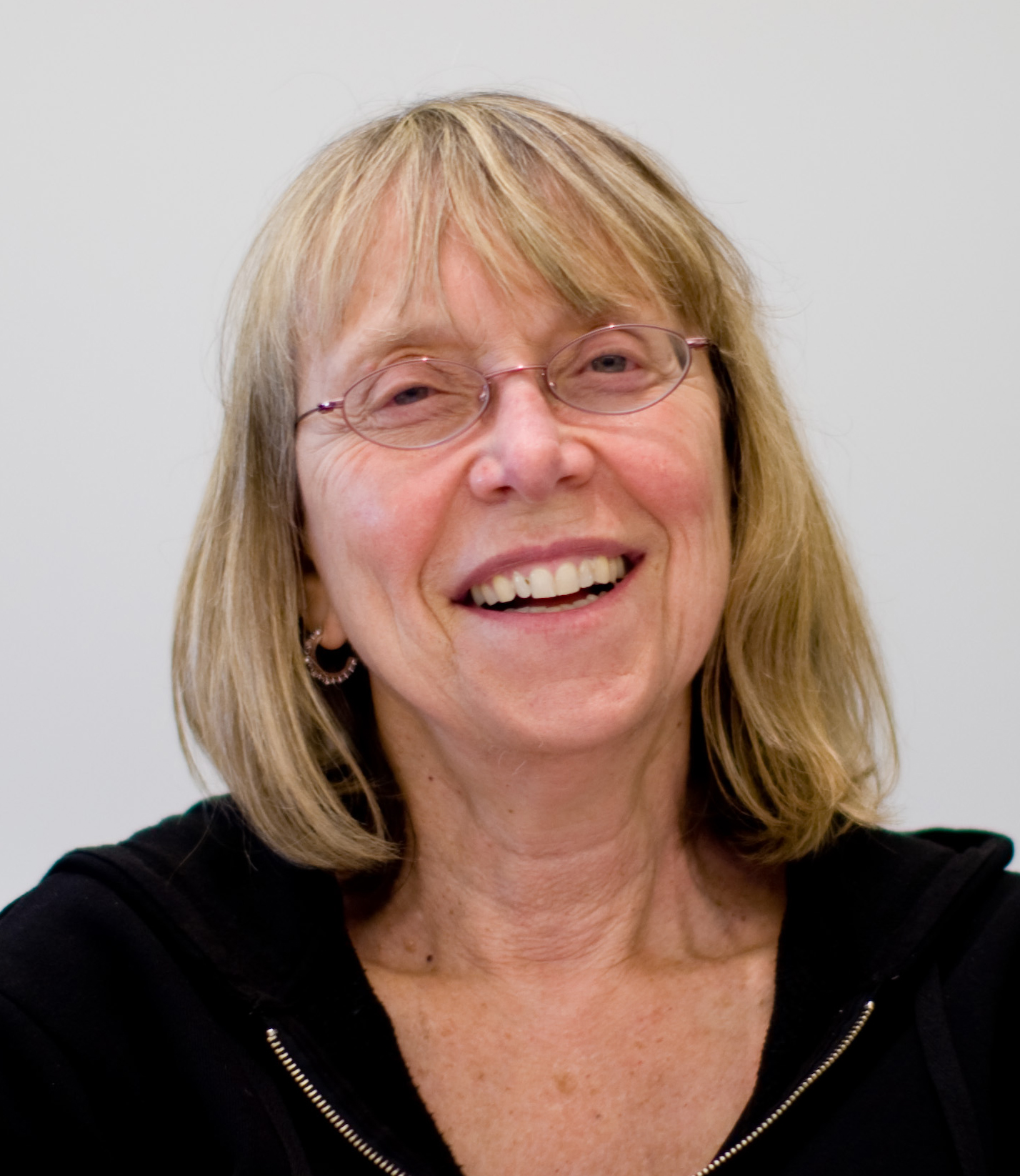
- Wojcicki in 2014
- Born: Esther Denise Hochman; 1941 (age 84–85); New York City, US
- Education: University of California, Berkeley (BA, MJ); Paris-Sorbonne University (MA); San Jose State University (MA)
- Occupations: Journalist, educator
- Known for: Moonshots: The Woj Way Pedagogical Philosophy (Trust Framework)
- Spouse: Stanley Wojcicki (m. 1962; died 2023)
- Children: 3, including Susan and Anne

Esther Denise "Woj" Hochman Wojcicki (/wʊˈtʃɪtski/ wuu-CHITS-kee; born 1940) is an American journalist, educator, and vice chair of the Creative Commons advisory council. Wojcicki has studied education and technology. She is the founder of the Palo Alto High School Media Arts Program in Palo Alto, California.

== Early life and education ==
Wojcicki is the oldest of three children and was the first in her family to attend college. Her parents were Russian Jewish immigrants who came to New York City in the 1930s. Her family moved to Southern California after she was born. Wojcicki was valedictorian of her high school class and attended the University of California, Berkeley, graduating with a B.A. in English and political science. She also received a secondary teaching credential and a master's degree in journalism from Berkeley. She has an M.A. in French and French history from the Sorbonne as well as both a secondary school administrative credential and a M.A. in educational technology from San Jose State University.

== Career ==
Wojcicki taught journalism and English at Palo Alto High School from 1984 to 2020. There she began a journalism program which has become one of the largest in America. She has also worked as a professional journalist for multiple publications and blogs regularly for The Huffington Post.

Wojcicki was the 1990 Northern California Journalism Teacher of the Year and was selected as the California Teacher of the Year in 2002 by the California Commission on Teacher Credentialing.

She served on the University of California Office of the President Curriculum Committee where she helped revise the beginning and advanced journalism curriculum for the state of California. In 2009, she was awarded the Gold Key by Columbia Scholastic Press Association in recognition of outstanding devotion to the cause of the school press. Wojcicki is also on the Board of Trustees of the "Developmental Studies Center" and on the Board of Governors of the "Alliance for Excellent Education".

She serves as Chair of the Board of "Learning Matters" and is part of the advisory board at the THNK School of Creative Leadership. She is Chief Learning Officer for Explore Planet3, an exploration based science platform for middle school students. Wojcicki is on the board of the Newseum in Washington, D.C., and the Freedom Forum. She holds an honorary doctorate from Palo Alto University (2013) and from Rhode Island School of Design (2016).

Wojcicki founded the Journalistic Learning Initiative at the University of Oregon School of Communications and School of Education (2016). She is also the founder of the Moonshots in Education Movement (MiE) (2017). In 2019 she published a book titled How to Raise Successful People, a parenting book on the philosophy she used in raising her three daughters. Wojcicki has discussed her life and the book on BBC Radio 4's Woman's Hour in May 2019.

She is on the board of the Embarcadero Media Foundation, which publishes several Bay Area newspapers. She is the founder of ParentingTRICK, an app on the Android and Apple stores. The goal of the app is to guide parents and help them have happy, independent, self-directed children.

Wojcicki mentored Steve Jobs' daughter, Lisa Brennan-Jobs at Palo Alto High School.

== Personal life ==
Her husband was Stanford University professor of physics Stanley Wojcicki, marrying in 1962. They have three daughters: Susan (former CEO of YouTube) who died in 2024, Janet, a Fulbright-winning anthropologist, assistant professor of pediatrics and researcher, and Anne (co-founder of 23andMe), and ten grandchildren.

== Works ==
- How to raise successful children : simple lessons for radical results, London : Hutchinson, 2019. ISBN 9781786331267, OCLC 1090425189
- Moonshots in Education: Launching Blended Learning in the Classroom, Pacific Research Institute, San Francisco, 2015 ISBN 978-1-934276-20-4
