= Pathfinder-1 =

Pathfinder-1 may refer to:

- BlackSky Pathfinder-1, an Earth imaging satellite.
- Pathfinder 1 (airship), a modern rigid airship, designed by LTA Research.
