= Sergey Brin Family Foundation =

American foundation

- Abbreviation: SBFF
- Formation: 2015; 11 years ago
- Founder: Sergey Brin
- Type: Private foundation
- Headquarters: San Francisco, California, United States

The Sergey Brin Family Foundation (SBFF) is a private foundation in the name of American computer scientist and businessman Sergey Brin, who co-founded Google. Focusing on scientific research, climate and the environment, and other humanitarian initiatives, the foundation is among the nation's largest with approximately $4 billion in assets.

== History ==
Established in 2015, the Sergey Brin Family Foundation (SBFF) is based in San Francisco and allows Sergey Brin, as well as his family, to support various causes. The foundation had approximately $3 billion in net assets in 2020 and 2022.

SBFF has no paid staff and operations are managed by the family office Bayshore Global Management. Brin is the foundation's director and president; other officers include a treasurer and a secretary.

=== Funding and granting ===
Brin donated Alphabet stock valued at approximately $63.3 million to the foundation in 2022. In 2025, he donated approximately $700 million worth of Alphabet shares to three organizations, with SBFF receiving shares valued at approximately $100 million.

SBFF granted approximately $124 million in 2019, followed by approximately $250 million in both 2020 and 2021. The foundation granted approximately $512 million in 2022. It granted approximately $699 million in 2024, which was an 86 percent increase from 2023, followed by approximately $1.1 billion in 2025.

== Activities ==
SBFF supports work related to health and central nervous system research, climate and the environment, Jewish causes, education and youth development, arts and culture, disaster response and humanitarian aid, economic development and human services, criminal justice and violence prevention, and the San Francisco Bay Area. Arts and culture organizations that have received funding from the foundation include the Prince George's County Memorial Library System and the Statue of Liberty Ellis Island Foundation. Related to disaster management, the foundation has funded organizations focused on immigrant rights and refugee crises, including Northwest Immigrant Rights Project and We Are CASA. SBFF has supported organizations "dedicated to the overlap between antiracism, antisemitism and Jewish ideas of justice", according to Inside Philanthropy, including HIAS, Jewish Board of Family and Children's Services, and Jews for Racial and Economic Justice. The foundation has also supported the establishment of the UMD's Brin Mathematics Research Center. In 2022, writers for Business Insider said Brin "appears to play a fairly active role in steering these donations".

=== Health and central nervous system research ===
SBFF has supported medical research and other work related to diseases and health, with particular focus on Parkinson's disease, autism, and bipolar disorder. Brin has donated $1.75 billion on Parkinson's research. The Coalition for Aligning Science helps implement the CNS Quest, which focuses on "accelerating discoveries, advancing treatments and care, and improving the daily lives of people impacted by Parkinson’s disease, autism, bipolar disorder, and other central nervous system conditions".

The foundation's Aligning Science Across Parkinson's (ASAP) initiative was established in 2018 and granted approximately $161 million to 21 research teams at 60 institutions globally in 2020. SBFF's largest donation in 2021 ($101 million) was to The Michael J. Fox Foundation, which focuses on Parkinson's.

SBFF granted $27.7 million to the Yale School of Medicine for autism treatment as part of the foundation's Aligning Research to Impact Autism (ARIA) initiative. Brin has funded the Breakthrough Discoveries for Thriving with Bipolar Disorder (BD²) initiative, which seeks to better understand and treat bipolar disorder.

During the COVID-19 pandemic, SBFF donated $100 million to COVID-19 relief initiatives as well as $15.2 million to the National Foundation for the Centers for Disease Control and Prevention. The foundation has donated hundreds of millions of dollars for research on neurodegenerative and psychological conditions, as well as "AI for prostate cancer" and SARS. SBFF has also funded Stanford University's WastewaterSCAN program on wastewater science and virus monitoring.

=== Climate change mitigation and environmentalism ===
Related to climate change and the environment, SBFF has supported organizations focused on clean energy, wildfire emergency management and suppression, and zero-emissions vehicles. The foundation granted approximately $243 million to climate-related organizations in 2024, which was an increase from $147 million in 2023.

=== San Francisco Bay Area ===
By late 2020, SBFF had donated approximately $520 million to nonprofit organizations based in the San Francisco Bay Area. Funding recipients have included homeless shelters, soup kitchens, the Ella Baker Center for Human Rights, the Vera Institute of Justice, and local affiliates of Boys & Girls Clubs of America and Meals on Wheels.
