= Bayshore Global Management =

Family office of Sergey Brin

Bayshore Global Management LLC
- Type: Private
- Industry: Family office
- Founded: 2005; 21 years ago
- Founders: Sergey Brin; Anne Wojcicki
- Headquarters: Palo Alto, California, U.S.
- Key people: George Pavlov (CEO)
- AUM: US$100 billion (2022)
- Number of employees: 100 (2022)

Bayshore Global Management LLC (Bayshore) is an investment firm that serves as the family office of Google co-founder Sergey Brin and until 2015, his ex-wife, 23andMe co-founder Anne Wojcicki. It manages over $100 billion of assets, making it one of the largest family offices despite its low profile.

Originally based in Los Altos, California, Bayshore is currently based in Palo Alto with an additional office in Singapore.

== Background ==
Bayshore was founded in 2005, after the initial public offering of Google, to manage the wealth of its cofounder Sergey Brin and his then-wife, Anne Wojcicki. The name Bayshore comes from an area in Mountain View where Google is headquartered.

In 2015, former venture capitalist George Pavlov was hired to manage Bayshore. In the same year, a disaster relief organization called Global Support and Development (GSD) was formed as part of Bayshore before being spun-out as a separate entity in 2019 with initial funding being provided by Brin.

In late 2020, Bayshore opened an office in Singapore. This was speculated to be done for both tax purposes as well as obtaining better investment opportunities in Asia.

In May 2023, it was reported that a De Havilland Canada DHC-6 Twin Otter that crashed almost 40 miles off of the coast of Half Moon Bay, killing two people, was owned by Bayshore. In a statement, Bayshore expressed condolences to the families of the crew on board and said it would provide them with the assistance needed.

Bayshore is estimated to manage $100 billion of assets with 50-100 employees, but has maintained a low profile and has been noted for how secretive it was. Bayshore has no website and there are few details about its investments. The firm has a close relationship with bankers at Morgan Stanley and also with the staff at Larry Page’s family office. Bayshore invests in all the standard asset classes such as equities, commercial real estate, and private equity. With regards to private equity, Bayshore does lots of long-term direct investing and recoils from limited partnership stakes in funds that have ten-year fund cycles. Bayshore also managed Brin's charity firm, the Sergey Brin Family Foundation.

Bayshore started receiving attention after divorce proceedings commenced between Brin and his second wife Nicole Shanahan, as the divorce was held in a court of public opinion. The company hired lawyers to negotiate with Shanahan's team, who hired Bryan Freedman.
