= Emrax 2 =

- Type: Electric aircraft engine
- National origin: Slovenia
- Manufacturer: Emrax

The Emrax 2 is a Slovenian electric motor for powering electric aircraft and other applications, designed and produced by Emrax d.o.o of Kamnik. The company was formerly called Enstroj and based in Radomlje.

By May 2018 the engine was no longer advertised on the company website and seems to be out of production.

== Design and development ==
The Emrax 2 is a brushless 200 Volt design, producing 30 to 35 kW (40 to 47 hp), with an outrunner coil. It has a 94% efficiency. The low working rpm of the engine means that it can turn a propeller at efficient speeds without the need for a reduction drive.

== Variants ==
Emrax 2 AC
Air-cooled version, producing 30 kW (40 hp) at 3000 rpm.
Emrax 2 LC
Liquid-cooled version, producing 35 kW (47 hp) at 3000 rpm.

== Specifications (Emrax 2 AC) ==
Data from Bayerl

=== General characteristics ===
- Type: Brushless electric aircraft engine
- Length: 86 mm (3.4 in)
- Diameter: 225 mm (8.9 in)
- Dry weight: 11.8 kg (26.0 lb)

=== Components ===
- Coil type: Outrunner
- Cooling system: air
- Reduction gear: none

=== Performance ===
- Power output: 30 kW (40 hp) at 3000 rpm
- Voltage: 200V
- Power-to-weight ratio: 7.8 kW/kg

== See also ==
Related lists

- List of aircraft engines
