= Linda Avey =

American biotech analyst, biologist, and co-founder of 23andMe

Linea (Linda) Avey
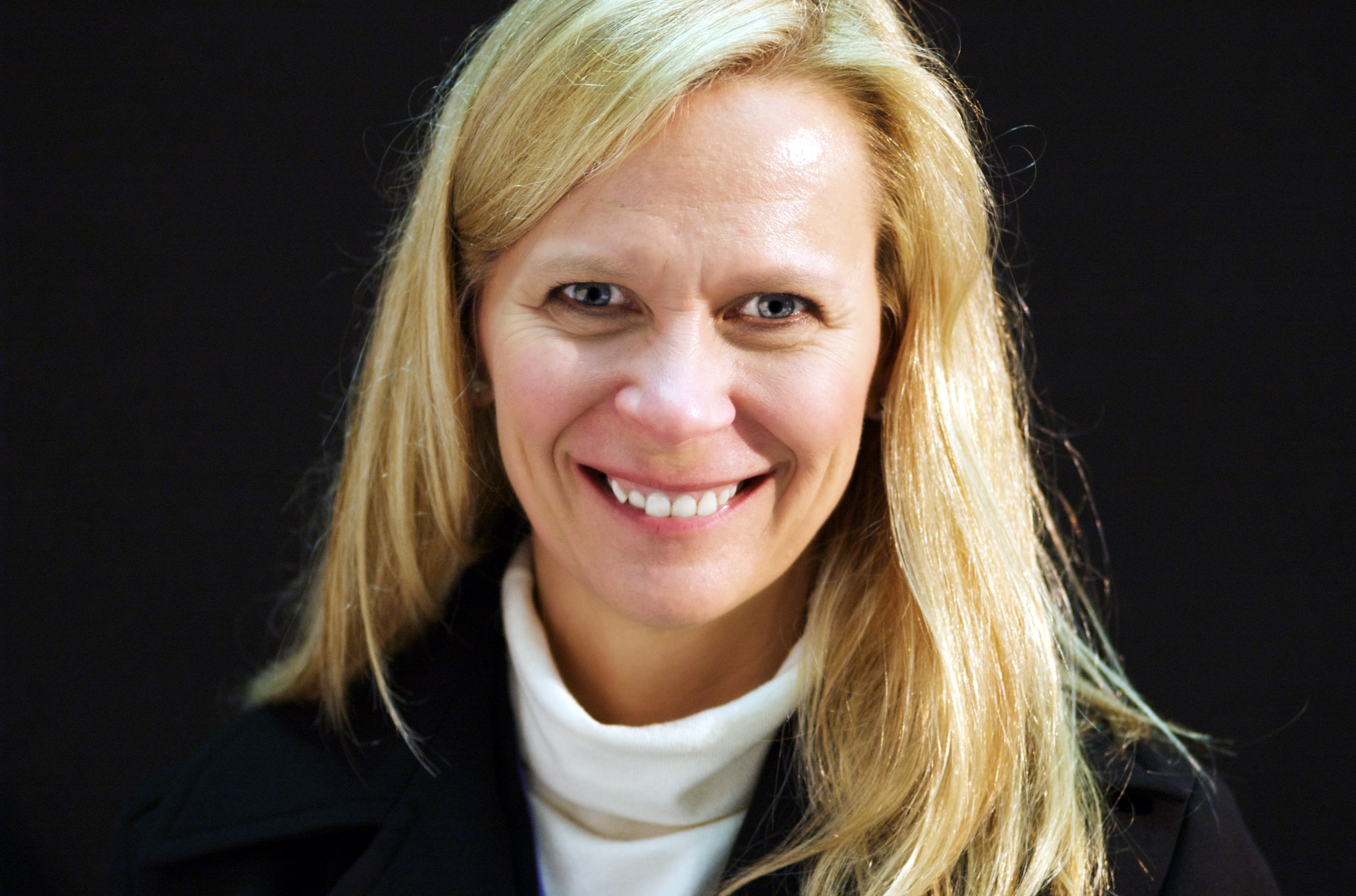
- Avey in 2008
- Born: 1960 (age 65–66); South Dakota, United States of America
- Education: Augustana University (BA)
- Known for: Co-founder of 23andMe; Precise.ly, Inc.
- Scientific career
- Fields: Personal genomics, Biotechnology, entrepreneurship

Linea Avey (formerly known by her birth name 'Linda Avey' )(née Bahnson) is an American biologist and entrepreneur. She is known for co-founding 23andMe, a consumer genetic data company.

== Early life ==
Avey was born Linda Bahnson in 1960, in South Dakota, United States. She attended Augustana University, where she received a Bachelor of Arts in biology, in 1982.

== Early career ==
Avey began her scientific career in 1982 at University of California, Irvine as a staff research associate. It has been stated that in 1985, she moved into various sales and business development in the fields of biopharmaceutical and academic research. As of 2024, a site to which Avey submits information was stating that she had "over 20 years of sales and business development experience in the biopharmaceutical industry in San Francisco, Boston, San Diego, and Washington, D.C." She worked at Perlegen Sciences, where she was part of the company's alliance management team, working on research collaborations and grant submissions to the National Institutes of Health. While at Perlegen, she worked on a Parkinson's disease study funded by The Michael J. Fox Foundation, through which she met Google co-founder Sergey Brin, whose mother had the disease. By late 2005, she had left Perlegen for Affymetrix.

She also held positions at Spotfire, Chemdex, Applied Biosystems, PerSeptive Biosystems, Molecular Dynamics, and Waters Corporation.

== 23andMe and later career ==
In March 2006 Avey, Anne Wojcicki, and Paul Cusenza founded 23andMe, "one of the first, and only, companies to offer genetic profiles directly to consumers, rather than through doctors or researchers". Avey left the company in 2009 but remained as a board member until 2011.

In 2009, Avey launched the Brainstorm Research Foundation, to "creat[e] an outsourced potential to do research" with "initial focus is on Alzheimer's disease" to "creat[e] novel cohorts and collec[t]... phenotypic information". In 2011, Avey co-founded We are Curious, Inc. with Heather Anne Halpert and Mitsu Hadeishi, a company focused on online aggregation of data from sensors, wearables, trackers, apps, social media, biometrics, and other personal data. In 2018, Avey and Aneil Mallavarapu began collaboration with Naryana Health to focus on collecting and analyzing genetic information from populations often economically excluded, via their further start-up, Precisely, Inc.

Avey is an advisor to Verily Life Sciences. In November of 2023, Avey joined the Board of Directors of the Human Immunome Project (HIP). In 2026, Avery serves on the Board of Directors of Perlara, a biotech company seeking cures for rare diseases.

23andMe filed for Chapter 11 bankruptcy in March 2025
