= Susan Wojcicki =

American business executive (1968–2024)

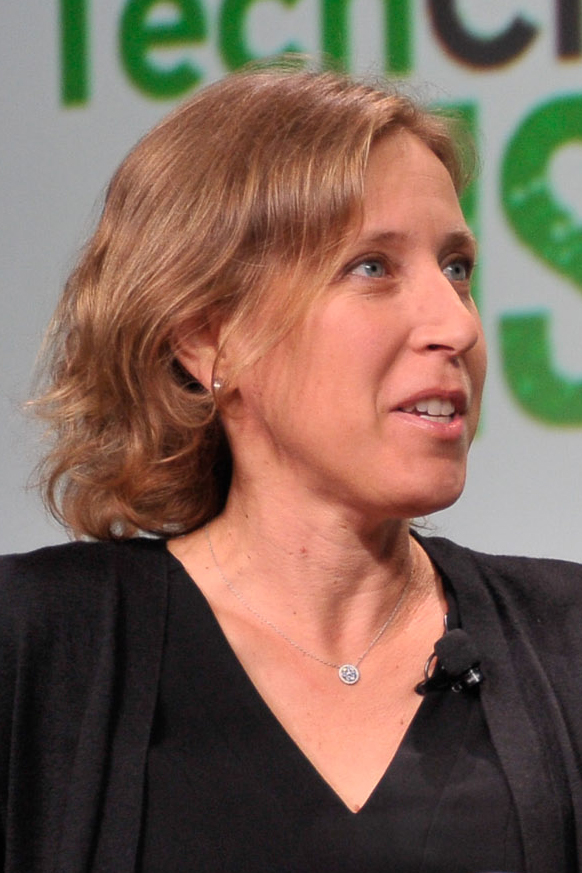
- Wojcicki in 2013
- Born: Susan Diane Wojcicki; July 5, 1968; Santa Clara, California, U.S.
- Died: August 9, 2024 (aged 56); Los Altos, California, U.S.
- Citizenship: United States; Poland
- Education: Harvard University (BA); University of California, Santa Cruz (MS); University of California, Los Angeles (MBA)
- Occupations: Business manager; executive advisor
- Title: CEO of YouTube (2014–2023)
- Predecessor: Salar Kamangar
- Successor: Neal Mohan
- Board member of: Salesforce; Room to Read; UCLA Anderson School of Management
- Spouse: Dennis Troper (m. 1998)
- Children: 5
- Parents: Stanley Wojcicki (father); Esther Wojcicki (mother)
- Relatives: Anne Wojcicki (sister); Janina Wójcicka Hoskins (grandmother); Franciszek Wójcicki (grandfather)

Susan Diane Wojcicki (/wuːˈtʃɪtski/ woo-CHITS-kee; July 5, 1968 – August 9, 2024) was an American business executive who was the chief executive officer of YouTube from 2014 to 2023. Her net worth was estimated at $765 million in 2022.

She became involved with Google in 1998 when she rented out her garage as an office to the company's founders. She worked as Google's first marketing manager in 1999, leading the company's online advertising business and original video service. After observing the success of YouTube, she suggested that Google should buy it; the deal was approved for $1.65 billion in 2006. She was appointed CEO of YouTube in 2014, serving until resigning in February 2023.

== Early life and education ==
Susan Diane Wojcicki was born in Santa Clara, California, on July 5, 1968, the daughter of Esther Wojcicki, an American journalist, and Stanley Wojcicki, a Polish physics professor at Stanford University. Her paternal grandfather, Franciszek Wójcicki, was a Polish politician who was elected MP during the 1947 Polish legislative election. Her paternal grandmother, Janina Wójcicka Hoskins, was a Polish-American librarian at the Library of Congress and was responsible for building the largest collection of Polish material in the U.S. Her maternal grandparents were Russian Jewish immigrants and her Jewish background had a strong influence on her values and traditions. She had two sisters: Janet, a doctor of anthropology and epidemiology, and Anne, an entrepreneur who is the co-founder and CEO of 23andMe.

Wojcicki grew up on the Stanford campus, where mathematical scientist George Dantzig was her neighbor. She attended Gunn High School in Palo Alto, California, and wrote for the school newspaper. Her first business was selling "spice ropes" door-to-door at the age of eleven. A humanities major in college, she took her first computer science class as a senior. She studied history and literature at Harvard University and graduated with honors in 1990. She originally planned on getting a PhD in economics and pursuing a career in academia but changed her plans when she discovered an interest in technology. She subsequently earned her MS in economics in 1993 from the University of California, Santa Cruz, and her MBA in 1998 from the UCLA Anderson School of Management.

== Career ==
=== Before Google ===
She was a consultant at Bain & Company and at R.B. Webber & Company.

=== Google ===
Wojcicki was Google employee #16. In September 1998, the same month that Google was incorporated, co-founders Larry Page and Sergey Brin set up the Google office in Wojcicki's garage in Menlo Park, California. Wojcicki was introduced to the pair through a mutual friend around the time she was newly married and struggling to afford the mortgage on her recent house purchase. Page and Brin would use Wojcicki's garage as their office for $1,700 a month. They later converted three small ground-floor bedrooms into additional workspaces to accommodate their growing team. At Google, she worked on the initial viral marketing programs, helped create the company's longtime logo with designer Ruth Kedar, and spearheaded the first Google Doodles. She also co-developed and launched Google Image Search with engineer Huican Zhu.

In 2003, Wojcicki was the first product manager of one of Google's seminal advertising products—AdSense. She earned the Google Founders' Award in recognition for this work. Wojcicki was subsequently promoted to Google's senior vice president of Advertising & Commerce, and oversaw the company's advertising and analytic products, including AdWords, AdSense, DoubleClick, and Google Analytics.

YouTube, then a small start-up, was successfully competing with Google's Google Video service, overseen by Wojcicki. She had recommended and subsequently managed the $1.65 billion purchase of YouTube in 2006.

=== YouTube ===
In February 2014, Wojcicki became the CEO of YouTube. She was named "the most important person in advertising", as well as named one of Time's 100 most influential people in 2015 and described in a later issue of Time as "the most powerful woman on the Internet." In December 2014, she had joined the board of Salesforce. She also served on the board of Room to Read, an organization that focuses on literacy and gender equality in education, and was a board member of UCLA Anderson School of Management.

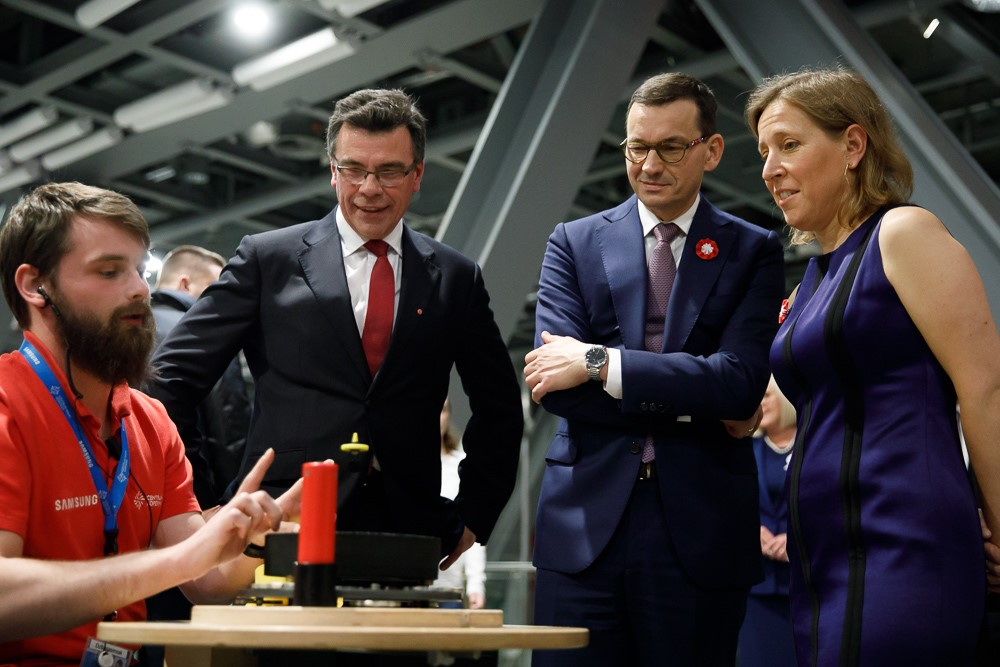
Wojcicki next to Polish Prime Minister Mateusz Morawiecki in Warsaw in November 2018

After Wojcicki became the CEO of YouTube, the company reached 2 billion logged-in users a month and users were watching one billion hours of content a day. By 2021, YouTube had paid more than $30 billion to creators, artists, and media companies. There are localized versions of YouTube in 100 countries around the world across 80 languages. From her appointment as CEO up to August 2017, YouTube's percentage of female employees rose from 24 to nearly 30 percent. Wojcicki also emphasized new YouTube applications and experiences designed to cater to users interested in family, gaming, and music content. While CEO, the company developed 10 forms of monetization for YouTube creators, including channel memberships, merchandise, BrandConnect, and paid digital goods like Super Chat. She also launched YouTube's advertisement-free subscription service, YouTube Premium (formerly known as YouTube Red), and its over-the-top (OTT) internet television service YouTube TV. In 2020, the company launched YouTube Shorts, its short-form video experience, which surpassed 50 billion daily views in February 2023. In November 2022, YouTube publicized that the company had surpassed 80 million Music and Premium subscribers, including trailers. The company also reported over 100 billion hours of global gaming content watched on the platform in 2020.

Wojcicki initiated the purges and deletion of channels and videos it regards extremely right wing politics and conspiracy theories in order to protect underage audiences. Around 2020 Wojociki started the promotion of content creators such as MrBeast, Joshlilj and Jack Doherty for providing a safe experiences for underage audiences, the more stringent policies came after The Times showed that "ads sponsored by the British government and several private sector companies had appeared ahead of YouTube videos supporting terrorist groups" and several large advertisers withdrew their ads from YouTube in response. The enforcement policies have been criticized as censorship. YouTube has also faced criticism that the company applies its enforcement policies inconsistently, with larger content creators treated more favorably. During the controversy surrounding Logan Paul's YouTube video about a person who died of suicide, Wojcicki said that Paul did not violate YouTube's three-strike policy, and therefore did not meet the criteria for being banned from the platform.

Wojcicki has emphasized educational content as a priority for the company, and on July 20, 2018, announced the initiative YouTube Learning, which invests in grants and promotion to support education focused creator content.

On October 22, 2018, Wojcicki wrote that Article 13, as written in the European Union Copyright Directive, would make YouTube directly liable for copyrighted content, and poses a threat to content creators' ability to share their work.

On February 16, 2023, Wojcicki announced her resignation from YouTube via a company blog post. She said she wanted to focus on "family, health, and personal projects" but would be taking on an advisory role across Google and its parent company Alphabet.

== Advocacy ==
Wojcicki was an advocate for several causes, including the fair wages and treatment of sex workers, the fair treatment of Haitian and Somalian refugees, countering female sexual discrimination at corporations, promoting coding to young girls, and providing safe sex rooms and condoms. She also owned a real estate holding company that worked on the sustainable growth of Los Altos, California. Wojcicki endorsed Hillary Clinton in the 2016 U.S. presidential election.

== Personal life and death ==
Wojcicki married Dennis Troper, a director of product management at Google, in Belmont, California, on August 23, 1998. He is also Jewish. They had five children. On December 16, 2014, ahead of taking her fifth maternity leave, she wrote an article in The Wall Street Journal about the importance of paid maternity leave. She was often quoted as talking about the importance of finding the balance between family and career.

In addition to her American citizenship, Wojcicki held Polish citizenship through her father.

On February 13, 2024, Wojcicki's son Marco Troper, a 19-year-old student at the University of California, Berkeley, died of acute drug abuse.

Wojcicki died on August 9, 2024, at the age of 56, after living with non-small-cell lung cancer for two years.

In November 2024, three months after her death, a final message prepared by Wojcicki was publicly released where she reflected on her career, highlighting the significance of creativity, collaboration, and adhering to core values in leadership.

== Recognition ==
- Wojcicki was named #1 on Vanity Fair's New Establishment list in 2019.
- In 2013, she was named #1 on the Adweek Top 50 Execs list, which recognizes the top media executives within an organization.
- In 2018, Wojcicki ranked #7 on Forbes's list of the World's 100 Most Powerful Women.
- In 2018, she ranked #10 on Fortune's list of Most Powerful Women.
- In 2023, she ranked #32 on Forbes's list of America's Self-Made Women.
- On April 15, 2021, Wojcicki was presented the "Free Expression Award" by the Freedom Forum Institute, a nonprofit dedicated to advancing First Amendment freedoms. The award ceremony was criticized for being sponsored by her own platform.
- In May 12 2026, Her death from lung cancer influenced the founding of the Susan Wojcicki Foundation.
