= Neal Mohan =

American business executive (born 1973)

- Mohan in 2026
- Born: July 14, 1973 (age 53); Lafayette, Indiana, U.S.
- Education: Stanford University (BS, MBA)
- Occupation: Business executive
- Title: At YouTube: CEO (2023–present); CPO (2015–2023)
- Predecessor: Susan Wojcicki (CEO); Shishir Mehrotra (CPO)
- Successor: Johanna Voolich (CPO)
- Board member of: Starbucks (2020–present); Stitch Fix (2020–2023); 23andMe (2017–2024); IAB (2012–2016)
- Neal Mohan's voice On who the next big creator on YouTube will be Recorded September 2026

Neal Mohan (born July 14, 1973) is an American business executive and chief executive officer (CEO) of the social media and online video sharing platform YouTube.

Before joining Google in 2007, when the company acquired DoubleClick, Mohan held roles at Accenture, NetGravity and DoubleClick. At Google, he was the senior vice president of display and video advertisements, and oversaw Google's expansion into display advertising. In 2015, Mohan moved to YouTube as the chief product officer (CPO). During the late 2010s and early 2020s, he advocated for the development of products such as YouTube TV, YouTube Music, YouTube Premium and YouTube Shorts. In February 2023, Mohan succeeded Susan Wojcicki as CEO of YouTube, following Wojcicki's resignation from that post.

In December 2025, Mohan was named Time CEO of the Year.

== Early life ==
Neal Mohan was born in Lafayette, Indiana, on July 14, 1973. His parents, Aditya Mohan and Deepa Mohan, were Indians from the city of Lucknow. Aditya Mohan moved to the United States in the early 1970s to pursue a PhD in civil engineering. He was admitted to Purdue University. Mohan grew up in Ann Arbor, Michigan, and moved to India in 1985 with his family, spending the next seven years completing high school at St. Francis' College, where he learned to speak Hindi and Sanskrit. At some point between 1991 and 1992, Mohan moved back to the United States. He returned to the US and attended Stanford University, graduating in 1996 with a degree in electrical engineering and in 2005 an MBA from the Stanford Graduate School of Business, where he was an Arjay Miller Scholar.

== Career ==
=== Accenture and NetGravity ===
After graduation, Mohan worked at Accenture. In 1997, he joined a startup called NetGravity, becoming a key figure in the company's operations and greatly expanding its prominence.

=== DoubleClick ===
In 1997, after NetGravity was acquired by DoubleClick, Mohan moved from California to the company's headquarters in New York, and gradually became more involved in central business affairs within the company. DoubleClick relied on Mohan for cost-cutting following the collapse of the dot-com bubble. He became the vice president of business operations.

In 2003, Mohan returned to Stanford to study for an MBA. While he was at Stanford, DoubleClick began to experience issues stemming from its acquisition of Abacus Direct in 1999. The merger was de facto annulled by Hellman & Friedman, which acquired DoubleClick and split off Abacus Direct from it. Hellman & Friedman requested longtime executive David Rosenblatt become CEO of DoubleClick following the company's partition. Rosenblatt accepted this offer and engaged Mohan after he acquired his MBA in 2005, under Mohan's condition he would stay in California.

Rosenblatt and Mohan devised a plan to move DoubleClick toward advertising exchange, advertising technology, and an advertising network. The plan was presented in December 2005 to the boards of DoubleClick and Hellman & Friedman, which approved it. Mohan became know for co-authoring a 400-slide presentation for potential DoubleClick investors.

=== Google ===
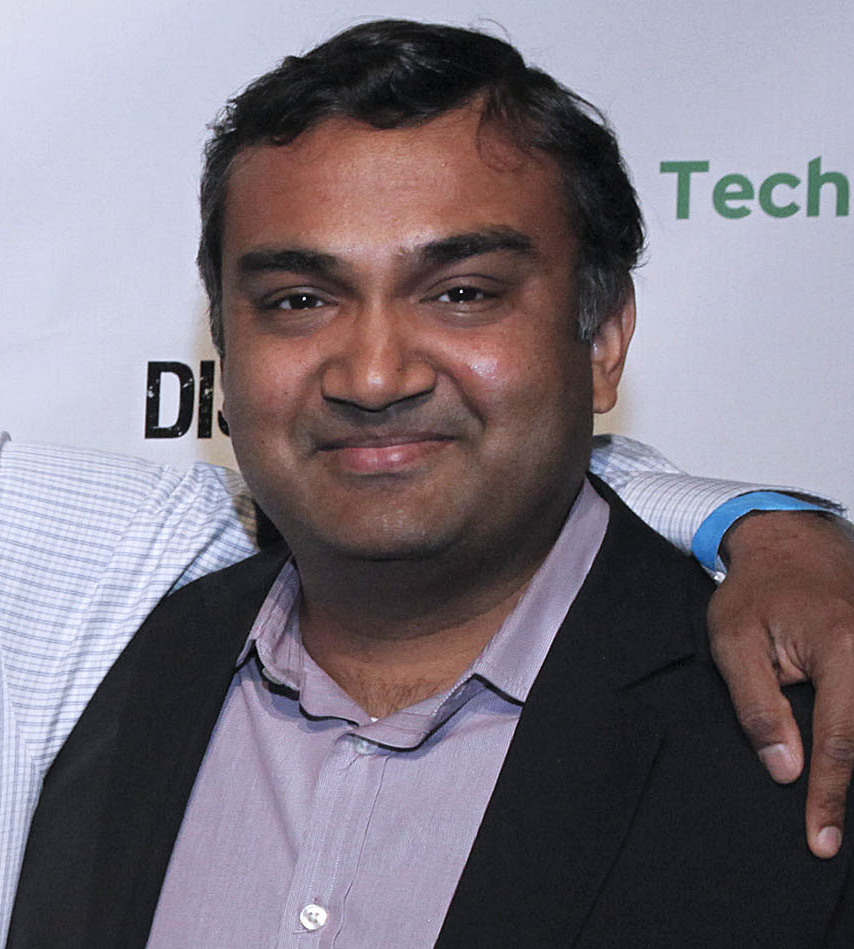
Mohan at the 2013 Tech Crunch Disrupt conference

On April 13, 2007, Google agreed to acquire DoubleClick for US$3.1 billion. Google executive Susan Wojcicki largely orchestrated this action. Wojcicki worked with Mohan, who joined Google in 2007 and worked on the integration of DoubleClick into Google. Mohan managed Google's 2010, US$85 million acquisition of Invite Media. He was Google's senior vice president of display and video advertisements, and oversaw Google's expansion into display advertising.

In 2011, Rosenblatt, who was now a board member of Twitter, attempted to hire Mohan as chief product officer. Mohan nearly accepted this offer but Google paid him US$100 million to remain at the company. A former Facebook senior executive stated he attempted to hire Mohan while Mohan was at Google.

=== YouTube ===
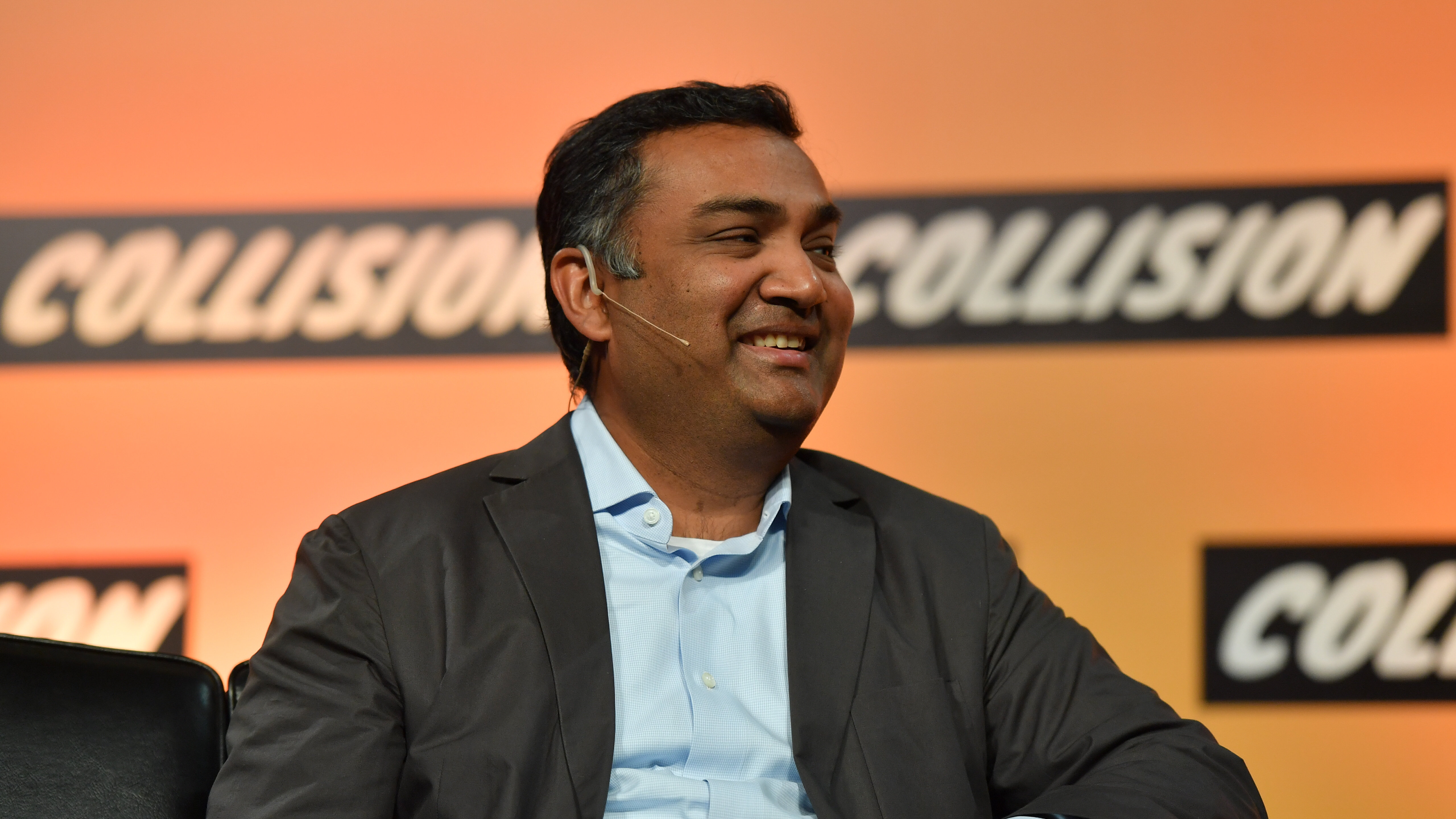
Mohan at Collision 2017 in New Orleans, Louisiana

In 2015, Mohan joined YouTube, a Google subsidiary, as chief product officer (CPO). He managed a number of its marquees, including YouTube Music, YouTube TV, YouTube Premium, and YouTube Shorts.

Following September 2020, Mohan appeared before the United States Congress and participated in a White House summit, during which he introduced a new content moderation policy to address violent extremist content on the platform. On February 16, 2023, Mohan was selected to succeed Susan Wojcicki as YouTube's CEO.

== Other ventures ==
Mohan has also worked at Microsoft, and sat on the boards of Stitch Fix and 23andMe. He resigned from the Stitch Fix board in December 2023, and from the 23andMe board in September 2024. As of 2026, Mohan sits on the board of directors of Starbucks and the board of trustees of Paley Center for Media. He also serves on the Advisory Council of Stanford Graduate School of Business and is a member of the Council on Foreign Relations.

== Awards and recognition ==
In 2023, for his role as CEO of YouTube, Gold House selected Mohan as an A1 honoree in business and technology on its A100 list. He was included in Fortune's 100 Most Powerful People in Business, placing 69th and 83rd in 2024 and 2025, respectively.

In 2025, Mohan was named Time CEO of the Year,Global Indian of the Year by The Economic Times, and was ranked fourth on Variety’s list of 120 Most Powerful Executives in Entertainment. He was included in the Time 100 list of most-influential people for 2026. In May 2026, Mohan was presented with a TAAF Award by The Asian American Foundation for being an Asian American leader in the entertainment and technology industries.
