= Emrax =

Emrax d.o.o
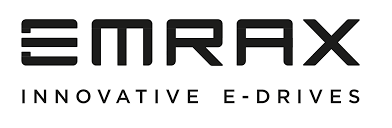
- Industry: Electric motors
- Founded: 2008
- Founder: Roman Sušnik
- Headquarters: Kamnik, Slovenia
- Key people: Urška Sušnik Omovšek (CEO)
- Products: Axial Flux Electric Motors
- Website: emrax.com

Emrax d.o.o is a Slovenian electric aircraft engine manufacturer founded by Roman Sušnik and based in Kamnik. The company specializes in the design and manufacture of electric motors for light aircraft, marine and automotive applications.

The company was founded in 2008 as Enstroj, to produce the Emrax line of engines, but the company name was later changed to Emrax. Initially located in Radomlje, the company was relocated to Kamnik.

The company is organized as a družba z omejeno odgovornostjo, a Slovenian private Limited Liability Company.

== History ==
In 2005, company founder and engineer Roman Sušnik conducted the first electric-powered aircraft flight in Slovenia and only the third such flight worldwide. During the test, the commercial electric motor used in the aircraft failed due to inherent design limitations. This experience motivated Sušnik to begin developing his own high-efficiency axial flux electric motors.

In 2008, he introduced the first generation of motors under the name EMRAX — an acronym for Electric Motor Roman Axial flux. The same year, he established the company under the name Enstroj, focusing on lightweight, compact and highly efficient propulsion systems, particularly for electric aircraft where mass is critical.

The early prototypes quickly attracted international attention due to their exceptional power density and efficiency. In 2014, Enstroj rebranded to EMRAX, marking the expansion of its product line and the company's shift toward a global market presence.

Between 2014 and 2018, EMRAX carried out intensive development of new motor series (including the 188, 208, 228, 268 and 348). From 2018 to 2020, the company transitioned to stable serial production. Today, EMRAX maintains in-house development and manufacturing in Slovenia, with most of its products exported to international markets.

== Products ==
Summary of previous (aircraft) engines built by Emrax:

- Emrax 2
- Emrax 207

Summary of current electric motor engines built by Emrax:

- Emrax 188
- Emrax 208
- Emrax 228
- Emrax 268
- Emrax 348

The motors are available in configurations for:

- aviation (UL aircraft, eVTOLs, drones, experimental aircraft),
- automotive applications (conversions, prototypes, high-performance vehicles),
- marine use (sailboats, boats, high-efficiency propulsion systems),
- industrial applications,
- hybrid generator systems.

== Applications and achievements ==
EMRAX motors are used in numerous international projects. One well-known example is an electric circumnavigation of the world, in which a Slovenian-built axial-flux EMRAX motor served as the primary propulsion system of the vehicle.

=== Velis Electro ===
One of the most prominent applications is the Slovenian aircraft Pipistrel Velis Electro – the first fully EASA-certified electric aircraft in the world (2020). The aircraft uses a propulsion system based on EMRAX axial-flux motor technology, contributing significantly to its high efficiency, low mass, and overall system reliability. The Velis Electro is widely recognized as a milestone in electric aviation, and its use of an EMRAX motor highlights the technological maturity and dependability of EMRAX solutions.

The company is frequently noted as one of Slovenia’s most promising companies and consistently achieves a high export rate, with 90–95% of production sold to international customers.
