= Emrax 207 =

- Type: Electric aircraft engine
- National origin: Slovenia
- Manufacturer: Emrax

The Emrax 207 is a Slovenian electric motor for powering electric aircraft and other applications, designed and produced by Emrax d.o.o of Kamnik. The company was formerly called Enstroj and based in Radomlje.

By April 2018 the engine was no longer advertised on the company website and seems to be out of production.

== Design and development ==
The Emrax 207 is a brushless design producing 70 kW (94 hp), with an outrunner coil. The low working rpm of the engine means that it can turn a propeller at efficient speeds without the need for a reduction drive.

== Specifications (Emrax 207) ==
Data from Tacke

=== General characteristics ===
- Type: Brushless electric aircraft engine
- Length: 85 mm (3.3 in)
- Diameter: 207 mm (8.1 in)
- Dry weight: 9 kg (19.8 lb)

=== Components ===
- Coil type: Outrunner
- Cooling system: air
- Reduction gear: none

=== Performance ===
- Power output: 70 kW (94 hp)
- Power-to-weight ratio: 7.8 kW/kg

== See also ==
Related lists

- List of aircraft engines
