= Pathfinder 1 (airship) =

American rigid airship

- Pathfinder 1 flying over Mountain View, CA on October 29th, 2026. Photo by Eli Melmon.

General information
- Type: Solitary testbed rigid airship
- Manufacturer: LTA Research

History
- First flight: 24 October 2024

Pathfinder 1 is a modern rigid helium airship, designed by LTA Research, with assistance from Luftschiffbau Zeppelin. It is the first massive rigid airship of its kind to fly since the Graf Zeppelin II in August 1939, and the largest aircraft in the world. In development since 2017, it first flew on 24 October 2024.

== Design and development ==
Google co-founder Sergey Brin originally founded LTA Research in 2013, possibly due to his interest in the Zeppelin NT, which began tourism flights from Moffett Field in Sunnyvale, California the year before.

After research at Goodyear Airdock in Akron, Ohio, where a 15 metres (49 ft) proof of concept airship was built, work began on Pathfinder 1 at Moffett Field in 2017. The airship is the first large rigid airship to be built since the 1930s, and includes new design features such as angled control surfaces to avoid the tail fin being dragged along the ground during mooring and staggered engines for vibration and drag reduction.

Pathfinder 1's outer skin is made of Tedlar, with the nose cone made of titanium, kevlar, aluminium and carbon fibre. Four angled tail fins are fitted to the airship, with the nose cone, gondola and tail fins manufactured by Zeppelin. Propulsion is provided by 12 Emrax 268 electric motors that can provide 210 kW of power. They drive three bladed propellers; eight are positioned longitudinally, four in a tail formation. Power is provided by two diesel generators and 24 batteries in a diesel-electric hybrid system. Its length (121.9 m (400 ft)) makes it the largest aircraft in the world.

Pathfinder 1 is designed as a solitary testbed airship, along with its sister ship Pathfinder 3, which is planned to be 1/3 larger. There is no Pathfinder 2, however.

== Flight ==
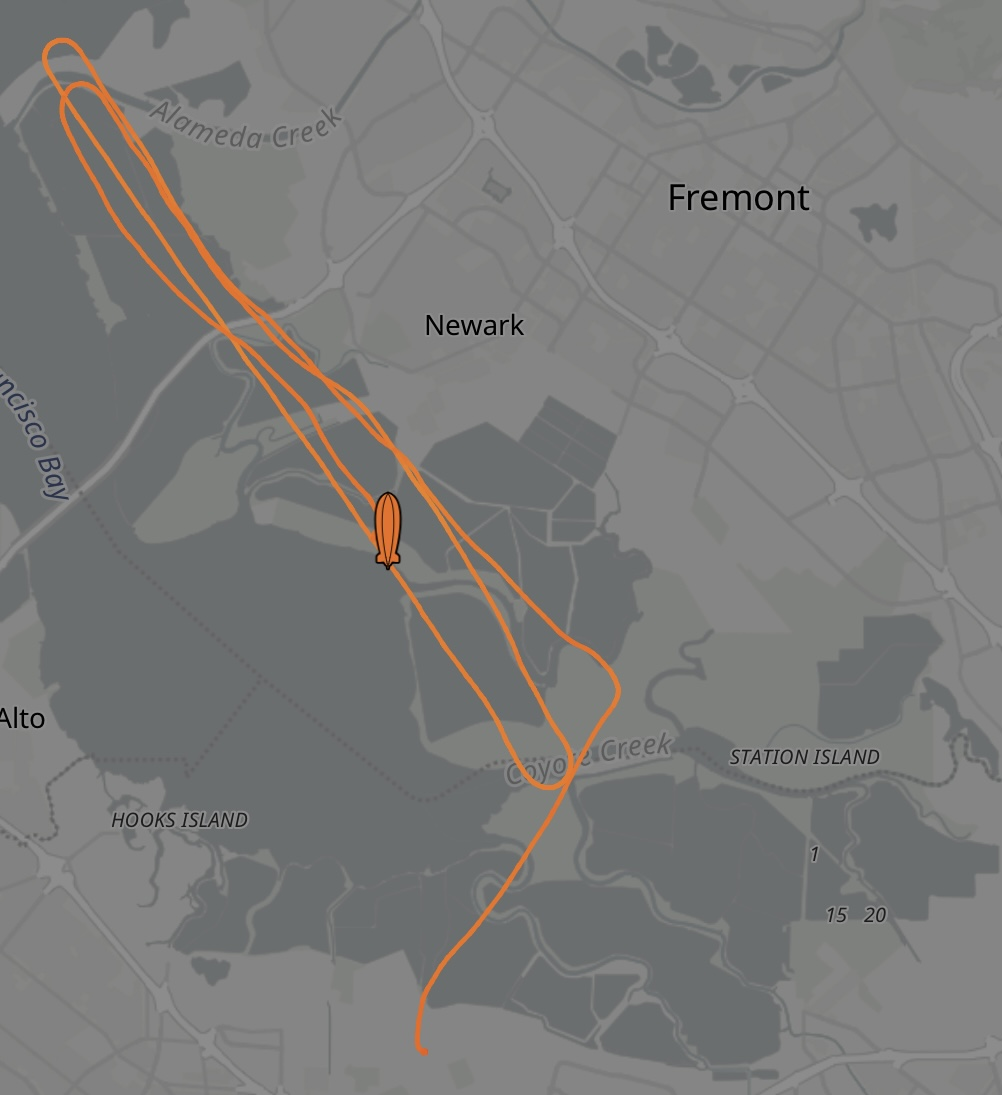
Flight track of the Pathfinder 1 over the southern San Francisco Bay during a test flight in September 2026.

Pathfinder 1 received a special airworthiness certificate in September 2023, allowing it to fly at altitudes of up to 460 m (1,510 ft), within the Moffett Field and Palo Alto Airport airspaces. The first outdoor tests of the airship took place in November 2023, with tethered testing outside the ship's hangar at Moffett field. On 24 October 2024, the first untethered flight was made. With plans for 25 low level test flights around the San Francisco Bay Area. The ship is often if not always followed by a filming helicopter, (tailnumber N2275Q, owned by Sierra Bravo Aviation Inc.) for promotional purposes. An extension of its allowable flight envelope was made in 2025, resulted in Pathfinder 1 extending its flights to include greater areas around San Francisco, including the Golden Gate Bridge. As of 2026, it has made at least two flights during the months of February and September.

== Specifications (Pathfinder 1) ==
Data from Modern Airships

General characteristics

- Crew: 2
- Capacity: 12 passengers
- Length: 121.9 m (399 ft 11 in)
- Diameter: 20.1 m (65 ft 11 in)
- Volume: 22,850 m^{3} (807,000 cu ft) gross
- Ballonet volume:
- Max gross gas lift: 25,401 kg (56,000 lb)
- Max disposable load: 4,536–5,443 kg (10,000–12,000 lb)
- Fuel capacity: 2 x 150kW diesel generators, 24 x batteries
- Powerplant: 12 × Emrax 268 , 210 kW (282 hp) each
- Propellers: 3-bladed

Performance

- Maximum speed: 120 km/h (75 mph, 65 kn)
- Range: 3,700 km (2,300 mi, 2,000 nmi)
