= Emrax 268 =

- Type: Electric aircraft engine
- National origin: Slovenia
- Manufacturer: Emrax

The Emrax 268 is a Slovenian electric motor for powering electric aircraft and other applications, designed and produced by Emrax d.o.o of Kamnik. The company was formerly called Enstroj and based in Radomlje.

== Design and development ==
The Emrax 268 is a brushless 250 volt design producing a peak of 230 kW (308 hp), 100 kW (134 hp) continuous, with an outrunner coil. It has a 98% efficiency. The low working rpm of the engine means that it can turn a propeller at efficient speeds without the need for a reduction drive.

== Specifications (Emrax 268) ==
Data from Tacke and manufacturer

=== General characteristics ===
- Type: Brushless electric aircraft engine
- Length: 91 mm (3.6 in)
- Diameter: 268 mm (10.6 in)
- Dry weight: 19.9 kg (43.9 lb)

=== Components ===
- Coil type: outrunner
- Cooling system: air and/or liquid
- Reduction gear: none

=== Performance ===
- Power output: 230 kW (308 hp) peak, 100 kW (134 hp) continuous
- Voltage: 250 V nominal
- Best efficiency: 98%
- Power-to-weight ratio: 11.6 kW/kg

== See also ==
Related lists

- List of aircraft engines
