= Dragonfly (yacht) =

2024 superyacht by Lürssen

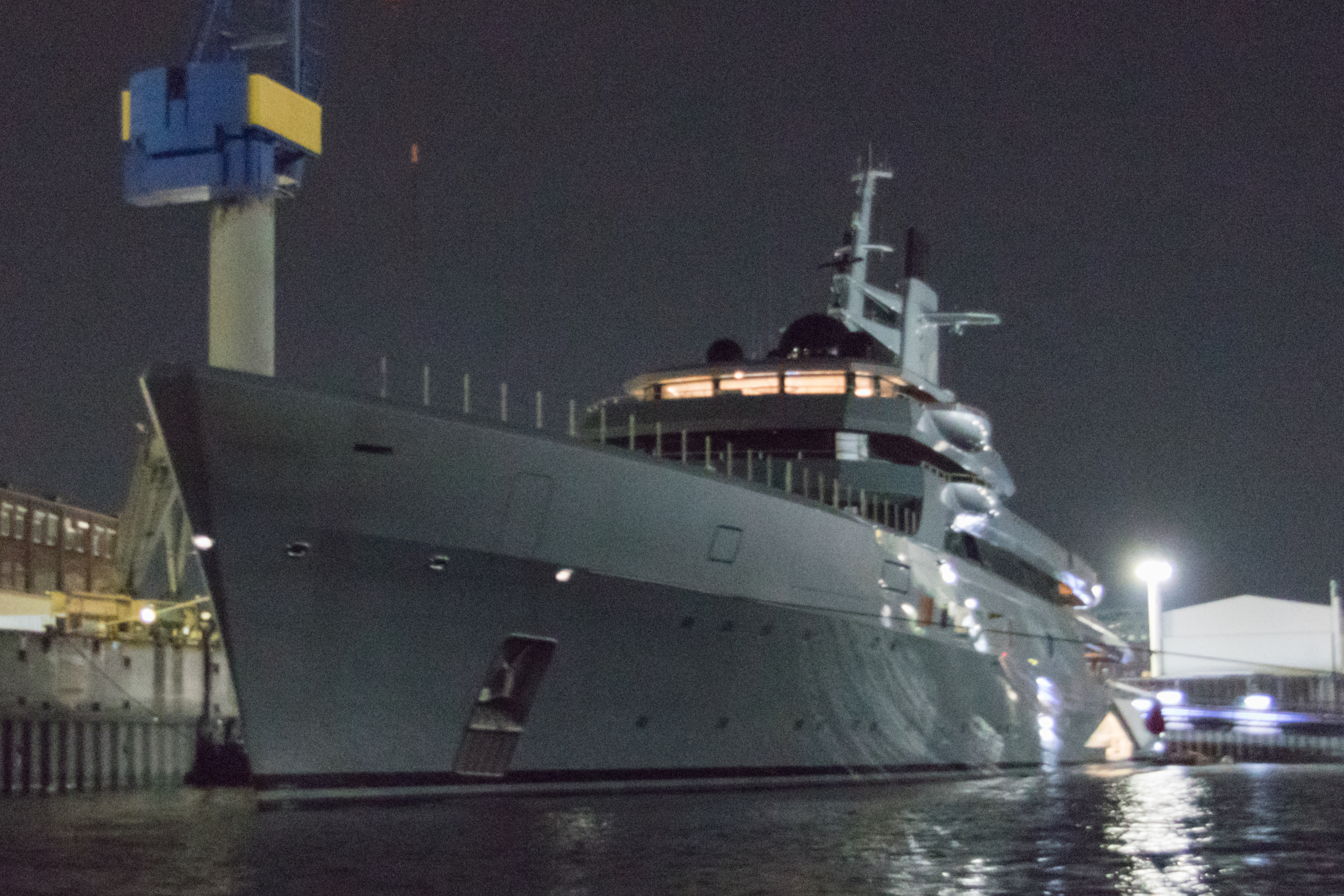
- In the port of Hamburg, 2024

History

Cayman Islands
- Name: Dragonfly
- Owner: Sergey Brin
- Builder: Lürssen
- Launched: December 2023
- Completed: December 2024
- Identification: IMO number: 9907196; MMSI number: 319296900; Callsign:ZGSU7

General characteristics
- Class & type: Motor yacht
- Tonnage: 9,408 GT
- Length: 142.1 m (466 ft)
- Beam: 20 m (66 ft)
- Draught: 6 m (20 ft)
- Propulsion: 2x 9,785hp MAN diesel engines
- Speed: 24 knots (44 km/h) (maximum)
- Capacity: 24 passengers
- Crew: 53

Dragonfly is a motor superyacht built by Lürssen Yachts in Germany that was delivered in 2024. With a length of 142 meters, Dragonfly is in the list of motor yachts by length on place 13. The vessel is registered in the Cayman Islands.

== History ==
The vessel was commissioned by Leonid Mikhelson as Project Alibaba. Construction started in 2019, and the keel was laid in 2020. The vessel was launched in December 2023 and delivered on December 3, 2024. During the construction, ownership changed to Sergey Brin. The cost of the ship has been estimated to be about $450 million.

== Design and specifications ==
The hull is of steel and the superstructure of aluminum. There are 5 decks with 2,000 square meters of living space. Aft of midships is a tender garage. The exteriors were designed by German Frers and the interiors by Nauta Design. No public photos exist of the interior.

The vessel's length is 142.1 metres (466 ft) with a beam of 20 metres (66 ft) and a draft of 6 metres (20 ft). The enclosed volume is 9,408 GT. It can reach a top speed of 24 Kts. It has two helipads, a shaded pool, a glass-bottom pool, a gym, a beauty salon, a games room, and a beach club. Twelve cabins are available for 24 guests. The yacht is laid out for a crew of 53.

== Performance and energy consumption ==
The ship has a diesel-electric hybrid propulsion system, allowing a top speed of 24 kn. Each of the two diesel engines was made by MAN and produces 7,300 kW/ 9,789 HP. The vessel has an electric Azimuth pod drive.

Dragonfly's electric energy consumption is substantial, and is comparable to that of a small cruise ship. Even without using propulsion, the "hotel load" system has to be active to power HVAC systems, lights, galleys, laundry, elevators, stabilizers, water management, electronics, and entertainment, including spas and pools. It has been estimated that the electrical consumption at dock reaches about 16,800 kilowatt-hours per day.

== Awards ==
1. Winner, Yacht Style Awards 2025, Superyachts over 80m
2. Finalist, Yacht of the Year, World Yacht Trophies, 2025
