= Anne Wojcicki =

American entrepreneur (born 1973)

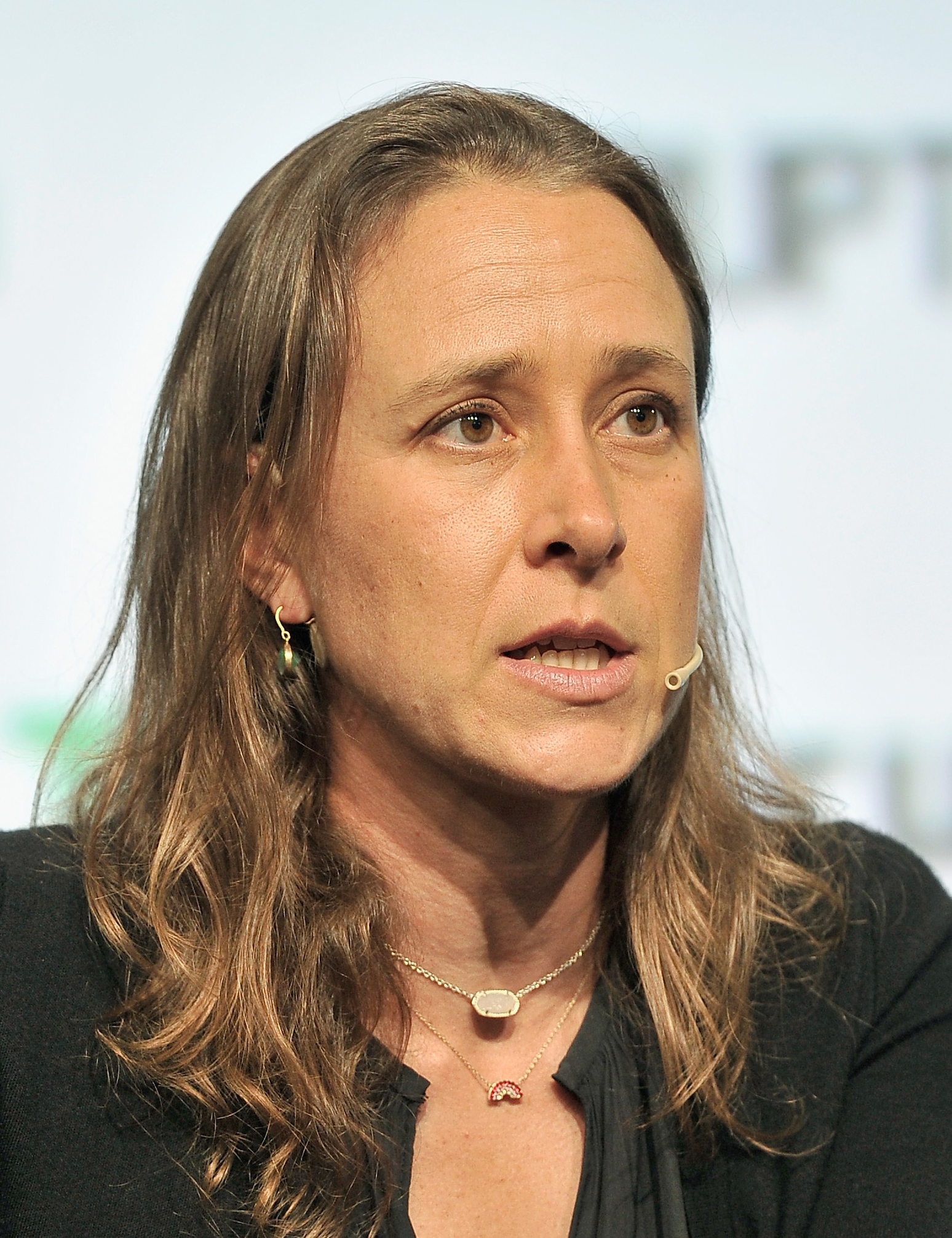
- Wojcicki in 2017
- Born: July 28, 1973 (age 53); Palo Alto, California, U.S.
- Education: Yale University (BS)
- Known for: Co-founder and former CEO of 23andMe
- Spouse: Sergey Brin (m. 2007; div. 2015)
- Children: 3
- Parents: Stanley Wojcicki (father); Esther Wojcicki (mother)
- Relatives: Susan Wojcicki (sister); Janina Wójcicka Hoskins (grandmother); Franciszek Wójcicki (grandfather)

Anne E. Wojcicki (/wuːˈtʃɪtski/ woo-CHITS-kee; born July 28, 1973) is an American entrepreneur who co-founded the personal genomics company 23andMe.

== Early life and education ==
Wojcicki was born in Palo Alto, California, the youngest of three sisters: Susan Wojcicki, former CEO of YouTube, and Janet Wojcicki, an anthropologist and epidemiologist. Her parents are Esther Wojcicki (née Hochman), an educator and journalist, and Stanley Wojcicki, a Polish-born physics professor emeritus at Stanford University. Her paternal grandfather Franciszek Wójcicki was a People's Party and Polish People's Party politician who was elected MP during the 1947 Polish legislative election. Her paternal grandmother, Janina Wójcicka Hoskins, was a Polish-American librarian at the Library of Congress; through her efforts, the Polish collections at the Library of Congress became the largest in the United States.

Wojcicki and her two sisters grew up on Stanford's campus. When she was fourteen, she learned how to figure skate and later started playing ice hockey.

Wojcicki attended Gunn High School in Palo Alto, where she edited the school newspaper, The Oracle, and won a scholarship for her sports stories. She received a Bachelor of Science in biology at Yale University in 1996. During her time there she played on the varsity women's ice hockey team.

== Career ==
Wojcicki began her career doing molecular biology research at the National Institutes of Health and at the University of California, San Diego. She later worked as a healthcare consultant at Passport Capital, a San Francisco-based investment fund, and at Investor AB. She was a healthcare investment analyst for four years, overseeing health care investments and focusing on biotechnology companies. Disillusioned by the culture of Wall Street and its attitude towards health care, she decided to forgo taking the MCAT to enroll in medical school and instead decided to focus on biological research.

=== 23andMe ===
Wojcicki co-founded and was CEO of 23andMe, a direct-to-consumer DNA testing company that allowed consumers to analyze their ancestry and health risks. She founded the company in 2006, with Linda Avey and Paul Cusenza, intending to provide common people access to their genetic information, which could potentially provide information on cures for diseases or treatments.

Consumers could purchase testing kits that provided information on ancestry, health, and genetic traits. The company took saliva samples that were mailed in by buyers, and processed the genetic data, posting the results online for the buyer to view.

The company was named for the 23 pairs of chromosomes in a normal human cell. The company's genome test kit was named "Invention of the Year" by Time magazine in 2008. Beginning in 2015, the Food and Drug Administration started to give approval to 23andMe's health-related tests, including risk from cystic fibrosis, sickle cell anemia, certain cancers, Alzheimer's, Parkinson's, and coeliac disease. In 2018, 23andMe entered into a four-year collaboration with GlaxoSmithKline to develop new medicines. When Wojcicki took 23andMe public through a merger with a special-purpose acquisition company in 2021, Forbes dubbed her the "newest self-made billionaire." By 2024, the company's valuation had fallen to two percent of its peak value of $6 billion, prompting Wojcicki to make a buyout offer to take the company private; the company's board of directors rejected her proposal and all seven independent directors quit.

On March 24, 2025, it was reported that 23andMe had filed for Chapter 11 bankruptcy and Wojcicki had resigned as CEO effective immediately but would remain on the company’s board. On June 13, 2025, TTAM Research Institute, a non-profit led by Wojcicki, regained control of 23andMe through a $305 million deal, buying back nearly all of the company's assets.

=== Other business activities ===
Wojcicki is a member of the Xconomists, an ad hoc team of editorial advisors for the tech news and media company Xconomy. In October 2013, Fast Company dubbed Wojcicki "The Most Daring CEO in America". She is a co-founder and board member of the Breakthrough Prize. She was ranked 93rd in Forbes's 2020 list of the World's 100 Most Powerful Women. In August 2021 Wojcicki joined the board of Cazoo.

Wojcicki has been closely involved in the downtown business district of Los Altos, California. In approximately 2005, Wojcicki and her then-husband Google co-founder Sergey Brin bought at least half a dozen commercial properties in downtown Los Altos. Under the name of Passerelle Investment Company, they sponsored events and urban planning initiatives throughout the downtown business district. In 2016, the firm was renamed to Los Altos Community Investments and given a tighter focus on commercial real-estate development. In 2021, Los Altos Community Investments opened a food hall in downtown Los Altos called the State Street Market. The initiative expanded to include an arts-and crafts store, a video arcade, and an indoor play space. The focus of development was to create spaces that foster community interaction and enjoyment.

== Philanthropy ==
Wojcicki and former husband Sergey Brin jointly ran the Brin Wojcicki Foundation, active from 2004 until its dissolution around 2019 after their divorce. They have donated extensively to the Michael J. Fox Foundation, and in 2009 gave $1 million to support the Hebrew Immigrant Aid Society.

Following her divorce, in 2015 Wojcicki created the Anne Wojcicki Foundation, which makes contributions to pre-selected charitable organizations and does not accept unsolicited requests for funds.

Wojcicki joined The Giving Pledge in 2022, committing to donating most of her wealth.

== Personal life ==
Wojcicki married Google co-founder Sergey Brin in May 2007. They have a son, born in 2008, and a daughter born in late 2011. They separated in 2013, and divorced in 2015.

In July 2019, Wojcicki gave birth to her third child, a daughter, through sperm donation.
