= Radomlje =

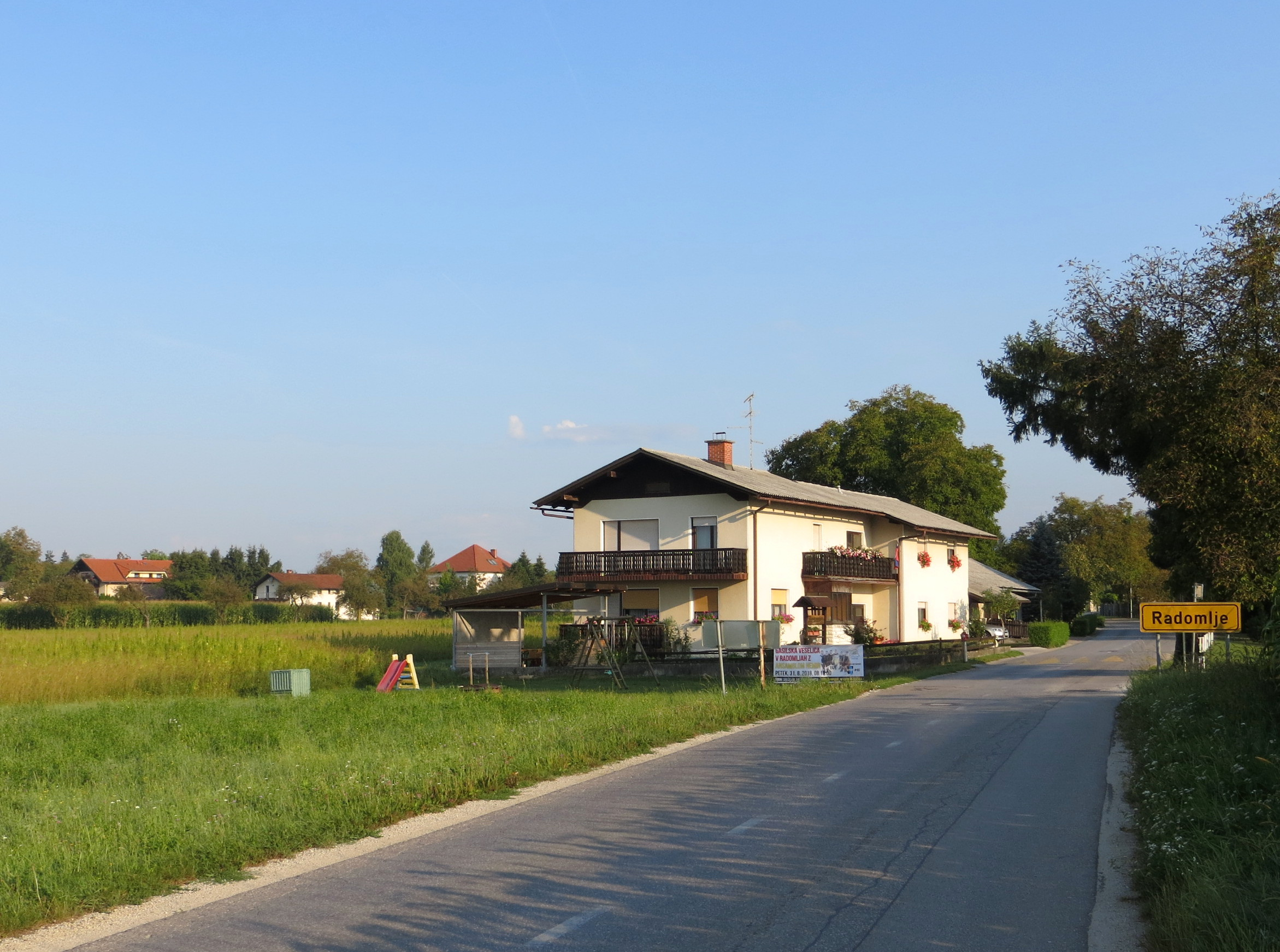

- Location in Slovenia
- Coordinates: 46°10′40.92″N 14°36′40.21″E
- Country: Slovenia
- Traditional region: Upper Carniola
- Statistical region: Central Slovenia
- Municipality: Domžale

Area
  - Total: 2.37 km^{2} (0.92 sq mi)
- Elevation: 333.1 m (1,093 ft)

Population (2020)
  - Total: 1,715
  - Density: 724/km^{2} (1,870/sq mi)
- Postal code: 1235

Radomlje (pronounced [ˈɾaːdɔmljɛ]; German: Radomle) is a settlement on the left bank of the Kamnik Bistrica River north of Domžale in the Upper Carniola region of Slovenia.

== Church ==
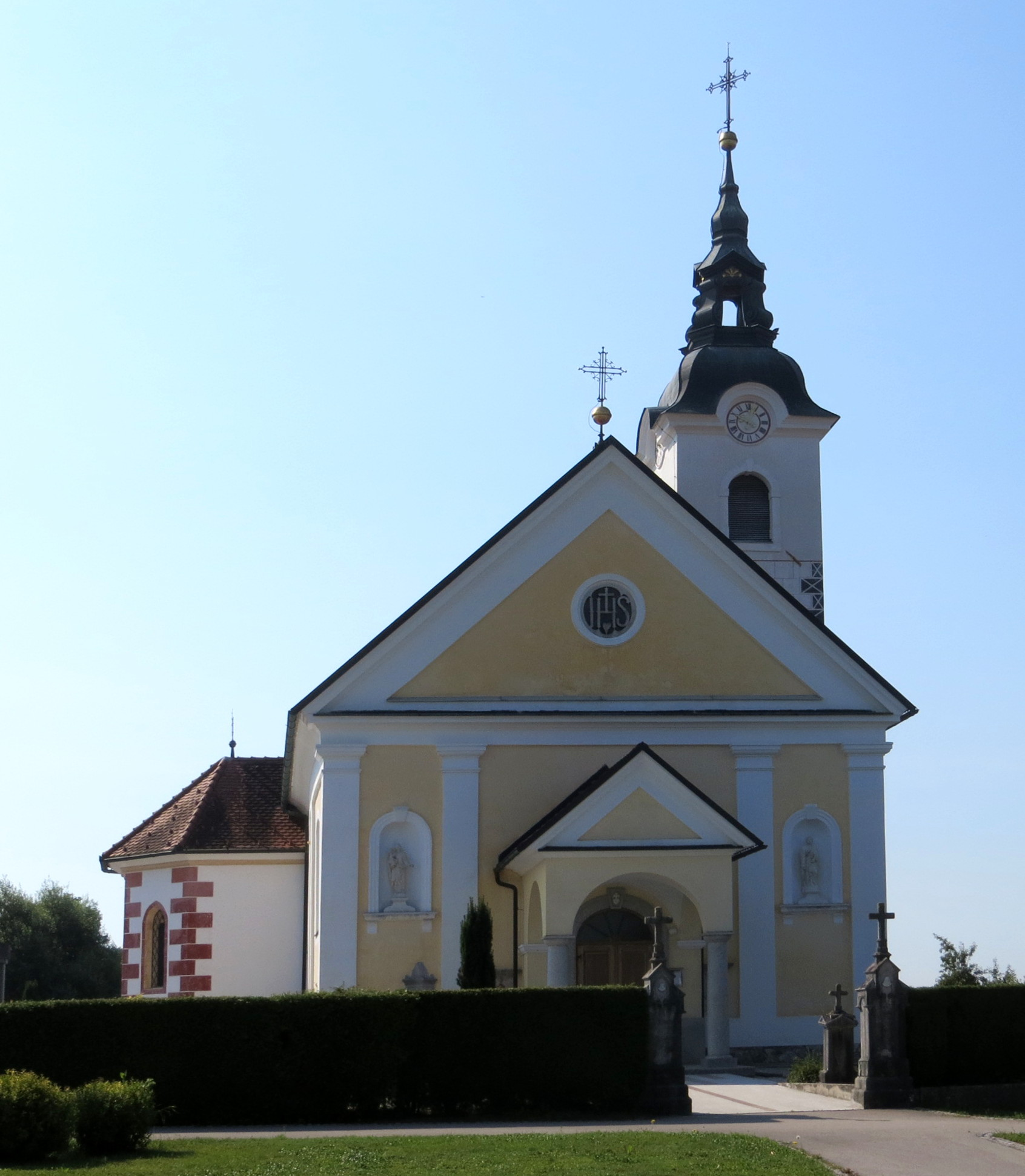
Saint Margaret's Church

The local church is dedicated to Saint Margaret (Slovene: sveta Marjeta) and was first mentioned in documents dating to 1391.
