= 23andMe =

American personal genomics company

23andMe Research Institute

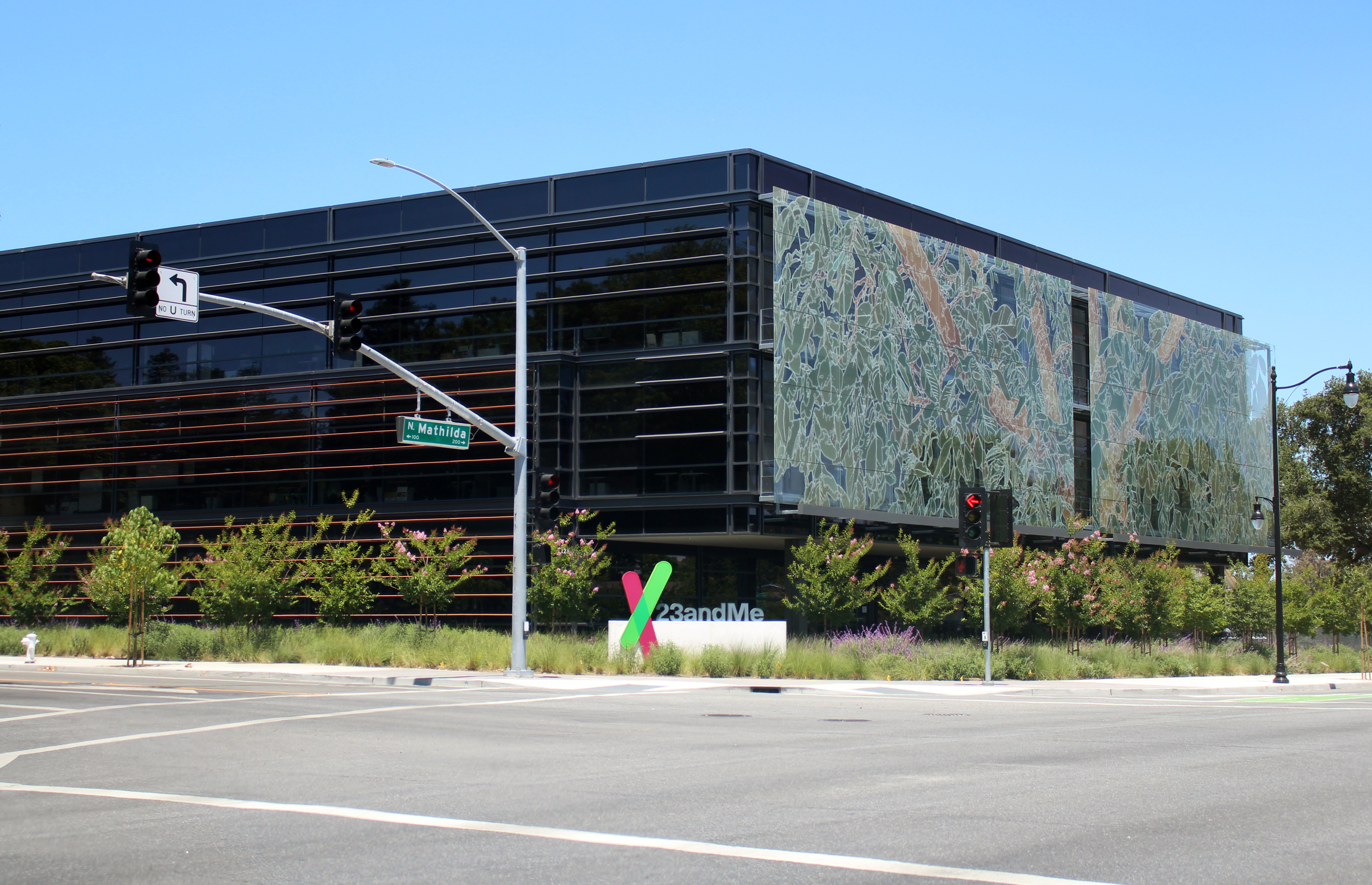
- Former headquarters in Sunnyvale, California
- Type: Nonprofit public benefit corporation (501(c)(3))
- Industry: Biotechnology; Genetic genealogy
- Founded: April 2006; 20 years ago
- Founders: Linda Avey; Paul Cusenza; Anne Wojcicki
- Headquarters: Palo Alto, California
- Products: Direct-to-consumer personal genome testing; Mobile application
- Services: Genetic testing; Genealogical DNA testing; Medical research
- Owner: TTAM Research Institute
- Website: 23andme.org

23andMe Research Institute is an American personal genomics and biotechnology nonprofit public benefit company based in Palo Alto, California. It provides a direct-to-consumer genetic testing service in which customers submit a saliva sample that is laboratory analysed using single nucleotide polymorphism (SNP) genotyping to generate reports on the customer's ancestry and genetic predispositions to health-related conditions. The company's name is derived from the 23 pairs of chromosomes in a diploid human cell.

Founded in 2006, 23andMe was the first company to offer autosomal DNA testing for ancestry, an approach now used across the industry. Its saliva-based genetic testing service was named "Invention of the Year" by Time in 2008. The company had an early confrontational relationship with the Food and Drug Administration (FDA) over its health-related tests, which were suspended in the US from late 2013 until October 2015, when the FDA began granting approvals for specific carrier status and genetic risk reports. Products including both ancestry and health-related components have been available in Canada since October 2014 and in the UK since December 2014.

23andMe went public in 2021 through a merger with a special-purpose acquisition company (SPAC), reaching a peak market capitalisation of approximately US$6 billion. By 2024, its valuation had fallen to roughly 2% of that peak. In March 2025, the company filed for Chapter 11 bankruptcy and CEO Anne Wojcicki resigned. The attorney general of California issued a consumer alert due to privacy concerns surrounding the sensitive genetic data held by the company.

Following a contested bankruptcy auction, TTAM Research Institute—a nonprofit public benefit corporation founded by Wojcicki—outbid Regeneron Pharmaceuticals and acquired substantially all of 23andMe's assets for $305 million. TTAM completed the purchase on July 14, 2025, and the company continues to operate as a nonprofit under TTAM's ownership.

As of February 2024, 23andMe had genotyped more than 14 million individuals, and its research database has contributed to hundreds of peer-reviewed publications across areas including Parkinson's disease, depression, COVID-19, autoimmune diseases, and pharmacogenomics.

== History ==
=== Founding and early growth (2006–2017) ===
Linda Avey, Paul Cusenza, and Anne Wojcicki founded 23andMe in 2006 to offer genetic testing and interpretation to individuals. Investment documents from 2007 suggest that 23andMe also intended to develop a database for research purposes. In 2007, Google invested $3.9 million in the company, along with Genentech, New Enterprise Associates, and Mohr Davidow Ventures. Wojcicki and Google co-founder Sergey Brin were married at the time.

Cusenza left the company in 2007 and Avey departed in 2009.

In 2012, 23andMe raised $50 million in a Series D venture round, nearly doubling its total capital of $52.6 million. In 2015, a $115 million Series E round brought total capital to $241 million. By late 2017, the company had raised approximately $250 million at a $1.75 billion valuation.

=== GlaxoSmithKline partnership (2018–2023) ===
On July 25, 2018, 23andMe announced a partnership with GlaxoSmithKline (GSK) in which GSK would use data from consenting customers to support drug development, investing $300 million in the company. In January 2022, the partnership was extended until July 2023 with an additional $50 million payment. In July 2020, the partnership produced its first clinical trial: a jointly developed cancer therapy.

=== Going public and Lemonaid acquisition (2020–2021) ===
The company was based in Mountain View, California, initially in North Bayshore and then downtown, until 2019, when it moved to larger headquarters in Sunnyvale. In January 2020, 23andMe laid off about 100 employees in its consumer testing division.

In December 2020, the company raised approximately $82.5 million in a Series F round, bringing total funding to over $850 million. In February 2021, 23andMe announced a merger with Sir Richard Branson's special-purpose acquisition company, VG Acquisition Corp, in a $3.5 billion transaction. The merger closed in June 2021; the combined entity, renamed 23andMe Holding Co., began trading on the Nasdaq under the ticker symbol "ME".

In October 2021, 23andMe acquired Lemonaid Health, a telehealth company, for $400 million, with the deal closing in November.

=== Decline and bankruptcy (2022–2025) ===
After reaching a market capitalization of approximately $6 billion following its public listing, 23andMe's valuation fell sharply; by early 2024 it stood at roughly 2% of its peak. Contributing factors included the company's persistent lack of profitability and the absence of recurring revenue from its one-time DNA test kits.

Wojcicki made several attempts to take the company private. An initial bid of $2.53 per share in February 2024 did not proceed. In July 2024, she offered 40 cents per share for all outstanding shares not already owned by her, but a special committee of the board rejected the proposal. In September 2024, all seven independent board members resigned. The company subsequently filed with the SEC indicating it was no longer open to third-party acquisition offers. Users attempting to delete their genetic data discovered that the company retained it for three years to comply with legal obligations. Further layoffs followed in November 2024.

In January 2025, 23andMe disclosed it needed additional liquidity and was exploring strategic alternatives including a potential sale. Wojcicki made a third offer of 41 cents per share in March 2025. On March 23, 2025, 23andMe filed for Chapter 11 bankruptcy protection as part of a plan to sell its assets, listing assets and liabilities each between $100 million and $500 million. Wojcicki stepped down as CEO and was replaced by CFO Joe Selsavage. Trading in the company's shares was suspended on March 31 and the stock was delisted from Nasdaq, subsequently trading over-the-counter.

California Attorney General Rob Bonta issued a consumer privacy alert reminding Californian users of their right to request deletion of their genetic data.

=== TTAM acquisition (2025) ===
The initial bankruptcy auction was won by Regeneron Pharmaceuticals for $256 million. As part of that agreement, Regeneron would have acquired all units of 23andMe except its telehealth service Lemonaid Health. However, the bankruptcy court reopened the auction after Wojcicki argued that her nonprofit, TTAM Research Institute, had been unfairly excluded from the bidding process. In the final round, TTAM submitted a winning bid of $305 million. 23andMe had separately announced it would cease being a public company and deregister from the SEC effective June 6, 2025.

TTAM completed the acquisition of substantially all of 23andMe's assets—including the Personal Genome Service, Research Services, and Lemonaid Health—on July 14, 2025. TTAM committed to honouring 23andMe's existing privacy policies, establishing a Consumer Privacy Advisory Board, and restricting future sale or transfer of genetic data unless any new owner adopted equivalent privacy protections.

== Technology ==
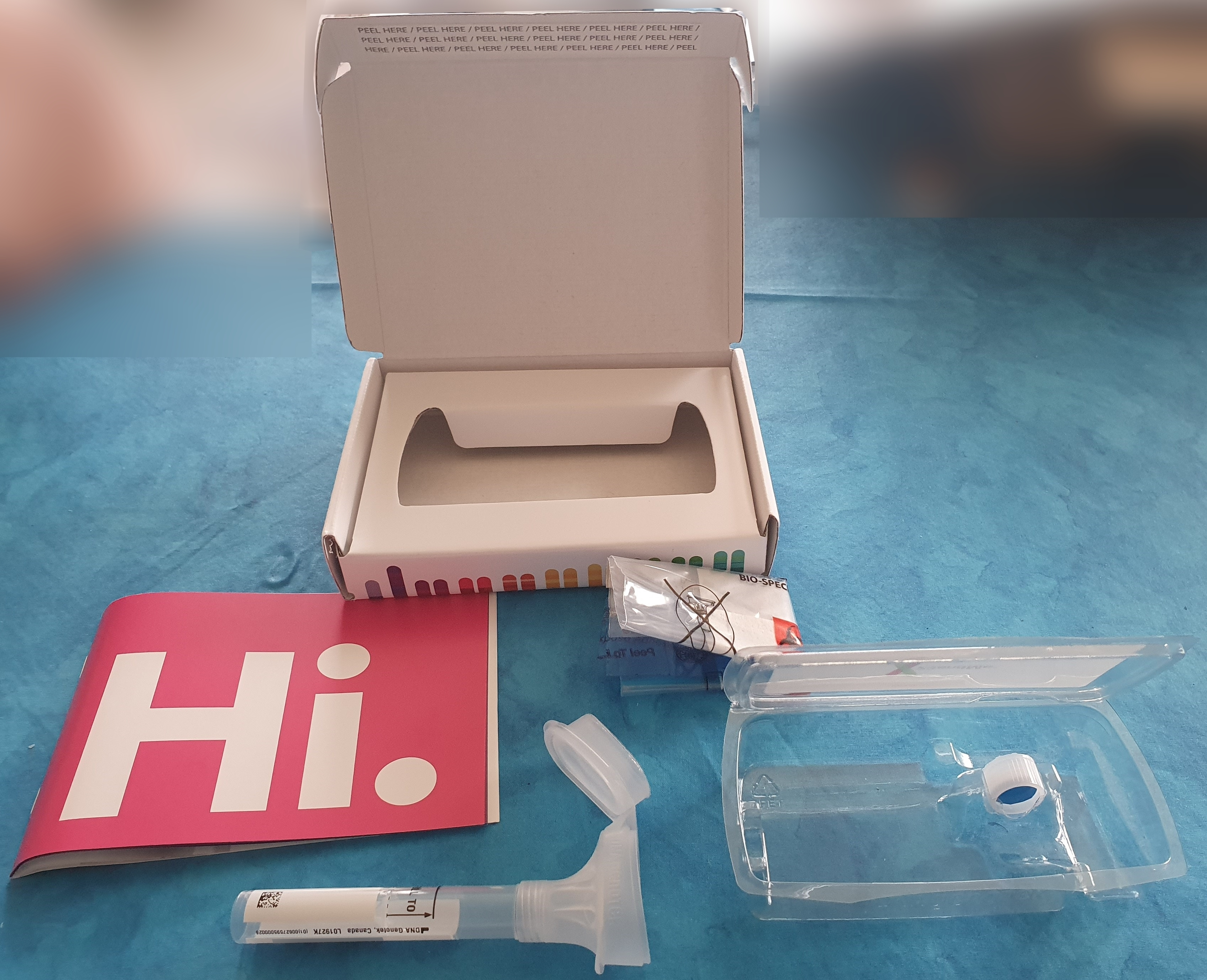
A 23andMe 2021 genome testing kit

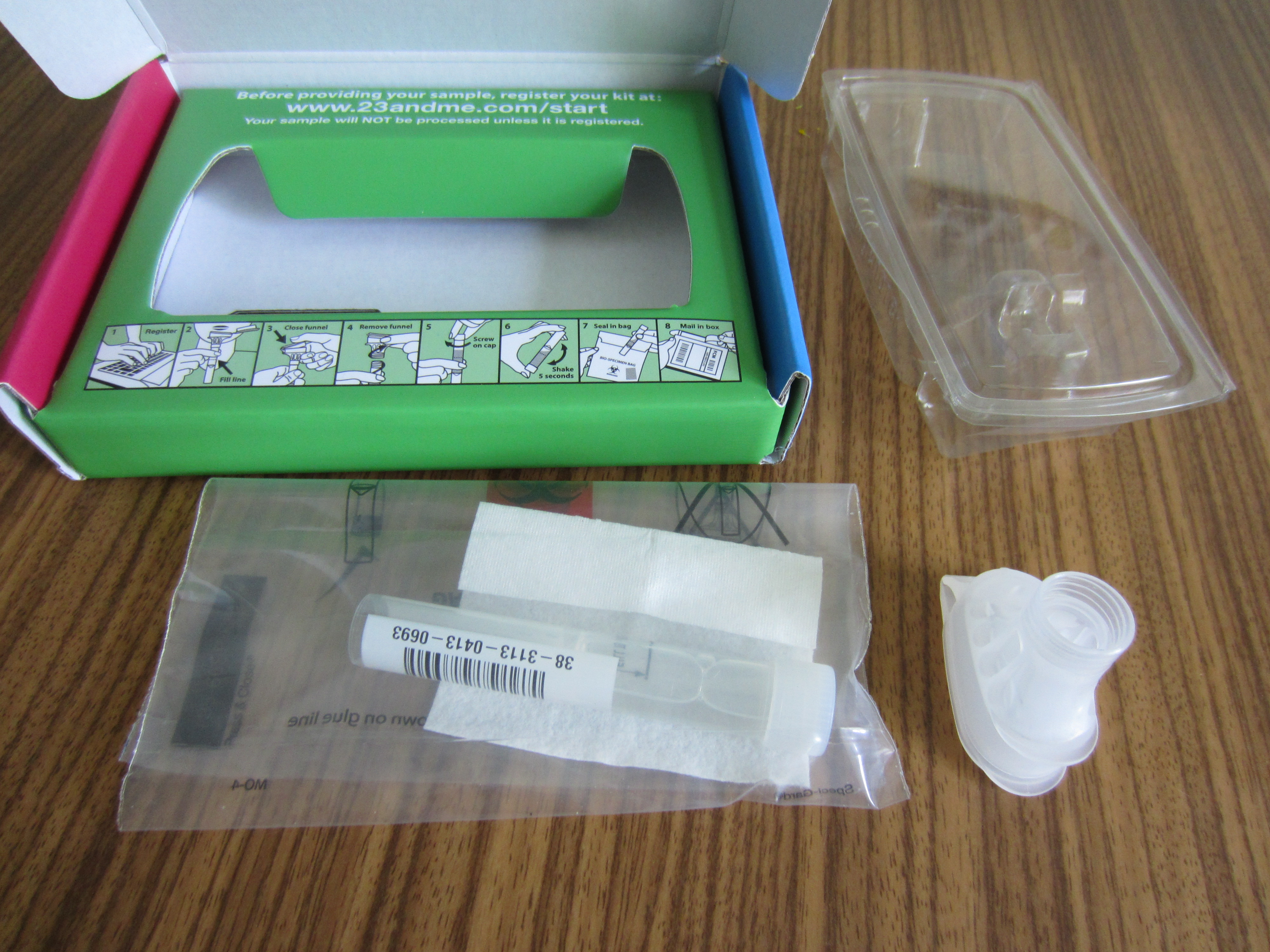
A 23andMe 2013 genome testing kit

23andMe began offering direct-to-consumer genetic testing in November 2007. Customers submit a saliva sample from which DNA is extracted and amplified. The amplified DNA is applied to a glass microarray chip manufactured by Illumina, which contains microscopic beads, each bearing a gene probe complementary to a specific genetic variant. Where the customer's DNA matches a probe, the sequences hybridise and a fluorescent label indicates the variant is present. The platform tests hundreds of thousands of variants out of the approximately 10 to 30 million present in the human genome, and the results are compiled into reports informing the customer about variants associated with conditions such as Parkinson's disease, celiac disease, and Alzheimer's disease. In 2008, when the company was offering estimates of predisposition for more than 90 traits and conditions, Time magazine named the product "Invention of the Year".

Customers can download their uninterpreted raw genetic data and view results by chromosome, including mitochondrial DNA, to compare their variants with common population frequencies. Ancestry customers have access to genealogical DNA test tools, including a relative-matching database, and can view their mitochondrial haplogroup (maternal lineage) and, if male or if a patrilineal relative has been tested, their Y chromosome haplogroup (paternal lineage). US customers who received health-related results before November 22, 2013, retain online access to assessments of inherited traits and genetic disorder risks. Health-related results for US customers who purchased the test from November 22, 2013, were suspended until late 2015 while undergoing FDA regulatory review. Customers in Canada and the United Kingdom have access to some, but not all, health-related results.

23andMe is commonly used by donor-conceived people to find biological siblings and, in some cases, their sperm donor or egg donor.

=== Instrument and chip versions ===
Until 2010, Illumina sold its genotyping instruments labelled "for research use only"; in early 2010, Illumina obtained FDA approval for its BeadXpress system for clinical use.

== Product history and pricing ==
=== Product tiers ===
In late 2009, 23andMe briefly split its service into three products—an Ancestry Edition, a Health Edition, and a Complete Edition—but recombined them a year later. A monthly subscription for research-based updates, introduced in late 2010, proved unpopular and was eliminated in mid-2012.

From November 22, 2013, to October 21, 2015, 23andMe sold only raw genetic data and ancestry-related results in the US due to FDA restrictions, after which it resumed providing health information in the form of carrier status and wellness reports.

=== Pricing ===
The US price declined from $999 at launch in 2007 to $399 in 2008 and to $99 in 2012, effectively serving as a loss leader to build the customer database. In October 2015, the price was raised to $199. In September 2016, an ancestry-only version was reintroduced at $99 with an optional $125 health upgrade. The product launched in Canada in October 2014 at CA$99 and in the United Kingdom in December 2014 at £125.

=== Ancestry and diversity initiatives ===
In February 2018, 23andMe enhanced its ancestry reporting to provide country-level rather than region-level estimates, adding 120 new regions. Acknowledging gaps in genomic data for Asia and Africa, the company launched the African Genetics Program in October 2016 (supported by a National Institutes of Health grant) to recruit sub-Saharan African participants. This was expanded into the Global Genetics Program in February 2018, targeting 61 underrepresented countries, and the Populations Collaboration Program in April 2018, establishing formal research partnerships.

=== 23andMe+ and Lemonaid Health ===
In October 2020, 23andMe launched "23andMe+", a subscription service priced at $29 per year, offering additional health and pharmacogenetic reports to Health + Ancestry customers genotyped on version 5 of its microarray chip. In late 2021, the company completed its $400 million acquisition of Lemonaid Health, a telehealth company.

== FDA regulation ==
The emergence of direct-to-consumer genetic testing raised questions about whether results could be meaningfully interpreted and whether they might lead to genetic discrimination. The regulatory environment for genetic testing companies remained uncertain, with anticipated risk-based frameworks slow to materialise.

=== State regulators ===
In 2008, New York and California each notified 23andMe and similar companies that they required CLIA licences to sell tests in those states. By August 2008, 23andMe had obtained the necessary California licences.

=== FDA warning and suspension (2012–2015) ===
According to Wojcicki, 23andMe had been in dialogue with the FDA since 2008. In 2010, the FDA notified several genetic testing companies, including 23andMe, that their tests were considered medical devices requiring federal approval; a similar letter was sent to Illumina, which makes the instruments and chips used by 23andMe. 23andMe first submitted applications for FDA clearance in July and September 2012.

In November 2013, the FDA published guidance on how it classified genetic testing services. At the same time, after six months without communication from 23andMe, the FDA ordered the company to stop marketing its personal genome service (PGS), stating that 23andMe had not demonstrated analytical or clinical validation and raising concerns about public health consequences of inaccurate results. By early December 2013, 23andMe had stopped advertisements for the PGS test and on December 5 suspended health-related results for new customers, continuing to sell ancestry services and raw genetic data.

23andMe publicly acknowledged it had not met the FDA's expectations regarding communication and timelines. Wojcicki described the situation as "new territory for both 23andMe and the FDA", noting that the regulatory process would help establish frameworks for the broader industry.

In May 2014, 23andMe began exploring international markets, including Canada, Australia, and the United Kingdom, to offer its full testing service. Health-inclusive products launched in Canada in October 2014 and in the United Kingdom in December 2014.

=== FDA approvals (2015–2018) ===
In 2014, 23andMe submitted a 510(k) application to market a carrier test for Bloom syndrome, providing data on analytical consistency, usability, and clinical validity. The FDA cleared the test in February 2015, stating it would not require similar applications for other 23andMe carrier tests. Further clarification was sent on October 1, 2015, and on October 21, 2015, 23andMe resumed marketing carrier tests in the US. Wojcicki acknowledged that "there was part of us that didn't understand how the regulatory environment works" regarding the distributed roles of the FDA and CMS.

23andMe then submitted "de novo" applications for genetic health risk tests. In April 2017, the FDA approved ten such tests, covering conditions including late-onset Alzheimer's disease, Parkinson's disease, celiac disease, hereditary thrombophilia, alpha-1 antitrypsin deficiency, glucose-6-phosphate dehydrogenase deficiency, early-onset dystonia, factor XI deficiency, and Gaucher's disease. The FDA stated it intended to exempt further 23andMe risk tests from 510(k) requirements and clarified that these were risk assessments, not diagnostic tests.

In March 2018, the FDA approved a direct-to-consumer test for three specific BRCA mutations most common among people of Ashkenazi descent; these are not the most common BRCA mutations in the general population, and the test covers only three of approximately 1,000 known mutations. These mutations are associated with increased risk of breast and ovarian cancer in women, and breast and prostate cancer in men.

== Research ==
=== Overview ===
Over 80% of 23andMe customers have opted in to having their data used for research. The company's research programme has produced hundreds of peer-reviewed publications using its large genotyped and phenotyped participant database. Aggregated customer data is studied by researchers employed by 23andMe and through collaborations with academic, government, and pharmaceutical partners; de-identified customer data has also been licensed to pharmaceutical and biotechnology companies. In July 2012, 23andMe acquired CureTogether, a crowdsourced treatment ratings startup with data on over 600 medical conditions.

23andMe offers an optional consent allowing individual genetic information to be included in research published in scientific journals. However, even without this consent, de-identified genetic and self-reported data may be shared with the company's third-party service providers.

=== Parkinson's disease ===
In 2010, 23andMe reported using its database to validate NIH-published work identifying mutations in the glucocerebrosidase gene as a risk factor for Parkinson's disease. In 2015, the company began pursuing in-house drug discovery under former Genentech executive Richard Scheller, with Parkinson's disease as a primary focus.

=== Inflammatory bowel disease ===
23andMe established research agreements with Pfizer to investigate the genetic basis of inflammatory bowel disease, including ulcerative colitis and Crohn's disease.

=== Depression and psychiatric disorders ===
In 2016, 23andMe used self-reported customer data to identify 17 genetic loci associated with depression. In 2017, the company began collaborations with Lundbeck and the Milken Institute focusing on the genetics of bipolar disorder and major depression, with aims of advancing drug discovery.

=== COVID-19 ===
In June 2020, 23andMe published preliminary results suggesting that people with type O blood may be at lower risk of COVID-19 infection. Among more than 750,000 participants, those with type O blood were 9–18% less likely to contract the virus, and those who had been exposed were 13–26% less likely to test positive. The study was published in April 2021 in Nature Genetics. Subsequent research examined genetic associations with COVID-19 symptoms such as loss of taste or smell, vaccine reactions across different ethnicities, and risk factors for long COVID. Findings on long COVID were presented at the 2023 ASHG conference.

=== Pharmacogenomics ===
In 2026, the 23andMe Research Institute published a genome-wide association study in Nature identifying genetic variants associated with variation in weight loss and side effects among users of GLP-1 receptor agonist medications.

=== Lung Cancer ===
In 2026, 23andMe published data in Science showing that a single rare variant in EGFR dramatically increases risk for lung cancer, and that the variant is more common in Southern Appalachian due to a recent founder event approximately 200 to 225 years ago.

== Informed consent and privacy concerns ==
Questions have been raised since at least 2013 about whether the company can adequately obtain informed consent through web-based interactions with people submitting samples for genotyping.

=== Data collection and third-party sharing ===
The company collects not only genetic and personal information from customers but also web behaviour data through its website, apps, cookies, and software. A combination of policies within its terms of service—covering cookies, aggregate data disclosure, and targeted advertising—has been described as making 23andMe a valuable data mine for third parties including health insurance companies, pharmaceutical companies, advertisers, biotechnology companies, law enforcement, and other parties. People may not be aware of how the company uses their data, and there are inherent risks of data breaches. Personal information of customers "may be accessed, sold or transferred".

=== Legal protections ===
==== United States ====
Since 23andMe is not classified as a medical provider, it is not subject to the Health Insurance Portability and Accountability Act (HIPAA). Research has found that very few consumers read terms and conditions (9% according to Deloitte; 1% according to ProPrivacy), suggesting many customers may have consented to research participation without fully understanding the permissions granted. 23andMe's privacy policy has been described as confusing for consumers. Despite these concerns, 23andMe's informed consent practices have been approved by an institutional review board. Several sections of the privacy policy have permitted data disclosure to third parties regardless of individual consent status, including provisions for third-party advertising networks to collect web behaviour data, inclusion of customer data in aggregate datasets shared with research partners even without consent, and sharing of personal information with affiliated companies.

The Genetic Information Nondiscrimination Act (GINA) protects individuals against discrimination based on genetic information by employers and health insurers in most situations. However, GINA does not extend to life insurance, long-term care, or disability insurance providers.

==== European Union ====
Effective May 25, 2018, 23andMe became subject to the General Data Protection Regulation (GDPR), which governs the collection, use, and storage of personal data and applies to companies offering services to individuals in the European Union, regardless of where the company is based.

=== Law enforcement ===
23andMe's transparency report, as of September 2024, states that the company had received requests from law enforcement for 15 US users' data since 2015, with none from other countries. No data was produced in response to any of these requests. The privacy policy states that 23andMe will not voluntarily share personal information with law enforcement absent a valid court order, subpoena, or search warrant.

=== 2023 data breach ===
In October 2023, a significant data breach was disclosed. Hackers accessed data on approximately 6.9 million users—roughly half of 23andMe's customers at the time—through a credential stuffing attack. Stolen data included names, addresses, and genetic information, and was subsequently offered for sale online. The affected accounts had enabled the platform's "DNA Relatives" feature, and the attack specifically targeted Ashkenazi Jewish and Chinese-descent users.

In June 2025, the UK's Information Commissioner's Office (ICO) fined 23andMe £2.31 million for failing to adequately protect user data, citing inadequate security measures—including the absence of multi-factor authentication—and a slow response to the breach.

In May 2026, the California Attorney General filed a lawsuit against 23andMe for failure to safeguard sensitive personal information under the California Consumer Privacy Act (CCPA) and other related privacy statutes.

== See also ==
- Genographic Project
- Biobank
- Personal genomics
- Direct-to-consumer genetic testing
- Genetic Information Nondiscrimination Act
