= Jens Vogt =

Norwegian businessman (1830–1892)

Jens Theodor Paludan Vogt (23 September 1830 – 25 October 1892) was a Norwegian engineer and first director of Kristiania Sporveisselskab who operated the first tramway in Oslo.

He was the son of a priest Niels Nielsen Vogt (1798–1869). He was a nephew of politicians Jørgen Herman Vogt and David Vogt, and a first cousin of Volrath Vogt and Nils Vogt. He grew up in Fiskum and studied at the Chalmers University of Technology in Gothenburg, Sweden. He also studied at the Leibniz University Hannover and at the Karlsruhe Institute of Technology before he was employed by the Norwegian Public Roads Administration in 1853. Vogt moved to Homansbyen in 1877. He married author Johanne Collett, and had the son Nils Collett Vogt—who became an important Norwegian poet.

Vogt travelled abroad often to study innovations in electrical tramways. In 1883, he visited London and Nantes. In the summer of 1885, he travelled to Antwerp and co-founded the International Association of Public Transport. Trygve Poppe succeeded him as director of Kristiania Sporveisselskap on 1 January 1894.

== Sources ==
- Fasting, Kåre (1975). Sporveier i Oslo gjennom 100 år 1875–1975 (in Norwegian). Oslo: Oslo Sporveier. ISBN 82-504-0116-6.
