= Travel plan =

A travel plan is a British term for a package of actions designed by a workplace, school or other organisation to encourage safe, healthy and sustainable travel options. By reducing car travel, travel plans can improve health and wellbeing, free up car parking space, and make a positive contribution to the community and the environment. Every travel plan is different, but most successful plans have followed a structured process in their development.

The term has largely replaced green transport plan as the accepted UK term for the concept that first emerged in the US in the 1970s (as site-based transportation demand management) and subsequently transferred to the Netherlands in 1989, where the terms company or commuter mobility management were applied.

== Features ==
The following common features underpin the site travel plan concept:

- Travel plans are not really an instrument themselves but a delivery mechanism or strategy for other mostly transport-focused measures.
- Travel plans are delivered by an additional 'agent' that is not a part of the 'traditional' transport policy institutional structure.
- Travel plans are initiated in one of two ways, either by the organisation or by the government.
- Travel plans seek to deliver transport and related benefits to the community at large as well as directly to the participating organisation.
- Travel plans are, to some extent, site-specific and tailored to the specific contextual circumstances.
- Travel plans deliver, to some extent, a package or a strategy of a wide variety of transport instruments.

They can work well as a 'package approach', allowing complementary tools to be implemented in one go, which means effective but unpopular tools (such as parking restrictions) can be introduced alongside popular but expensive tools (like bus subsidies) to deliver the required benefits whilst cancelling out the negative impacts. Next, the use of the additional 'agent' such as a workplace, school or even a football club means that travel plans replace the largely negative relationship between local authorities and citizens with a more positive relationship (such as between employer and employee or between school and parent/pupil). Finally, the site-specific nature of travel plans means they are developed at the neighbourhood level and focus directly on the transport needs of the users in that local area.

The concept works by developing balanced packages of user-focused transport tools in a partnership that seeks to provide meaningful benefits to each of the stakeholders involved: improved travel choices to the individuals; cost savings, happier and healthier staff, and a better company image to the implementing organisations; additional business opportunities to service providers; and congestion reduction and improved air quality to the government.

== Workplace ==
The UK Department for Transport defines workplace travel plans as a package of measures produced by employers to encourage staff to use alternatives to single-occupancy car use. The first travel plans in the UK were adopted in Nottingham by Nottinghamshire County Council in 1995. Travel plans are now common in the UK, and are starting to become more common in many places throughout Europe as well as in Australia and New Zealand.

A workplace can choose to develop a travel plan at any time or may be required to develop a travel plan as a condition of planning consent for an expansion or new development. Typical actions in a workplace travel plan include improving facilities for pedestrians and cyclists (showers, lockers and cycle parking), promotion and subsidy of public transport, encouraging carpooling, working from home, and teleconferencing.

== School ==
Making it safer and easier for children to walk, cycle or catch public transport to school has long-term health benefits, reduces air pollution and traffic congestion, and helps children arrive at school awake, refreshed and ready to learn.

Because of the many benefits, local councils in the UK, Australia and New Zealand are actively involved in helping schools to develop and implement travel plans. In Canada, a national pilot project running from 2010 to 2012 is designed to bring stakeholders together to build school travel plans collaboratively. Typical actions in a school travel plan include promoting the health benefits of walking, providing more or better pedestrian crossings, tighter enforcement of parking and traffic rules around the school, providing cycle training, and setting up a walking school bus. School travel planning groups like Green Communities Canada also work on a policy level to encourage multi-tiered governmental policies that support active travel.

=== Framework ===
A framework travel plan may be used for speculative development such as a business park where the occupiers of buildings are not known or where there will be multiple occupiers (such as a shared office block).

== Other organisations ==
There are many examples of successful travel plans for tertiary campuses. Successful tertiary travel plans are usually prepared with the assistance of the local public transport agency. As well as the initiatives listed for school or workplace travel plans, tertiary travel plans can include a U-pass system for student travel on public transport.

The development of travel plans for hospitals is a relatively new and interesting field of travel planning.

=== Planning consent ===
A real-estate developer may be required to provide a travel plan as a condition to gaining planning consent. A typical travel plan for a new development will provide for the promotion of sustainable transport through marketing initiatives and for contributions to public transport and to walking and cycling infrastructure. In the UK, a travel plan can form part of a Section 106 agreement, under the Town and Country Planning Act 1990.

== See also ==
- Transportation planning
- Travel behavior
- Travel blending
- Transportation Demand Management
