= Niels Vogt =

Niels Vogt may refer to:

- Niels Nielsen Vogt, Norwegian priest and politician
- Niels Petersen Vogt, Norwegian civil servant and politician
