= 2002 Liechtenstein referendums =

Amending Article 20 of the constitution
For	45.48%
Against	54.52%

Raising funds for the Little Big One music festival
For	34.20%
Against	65.80%

Law on land-use planning
For	25.73%
Against	74.27%
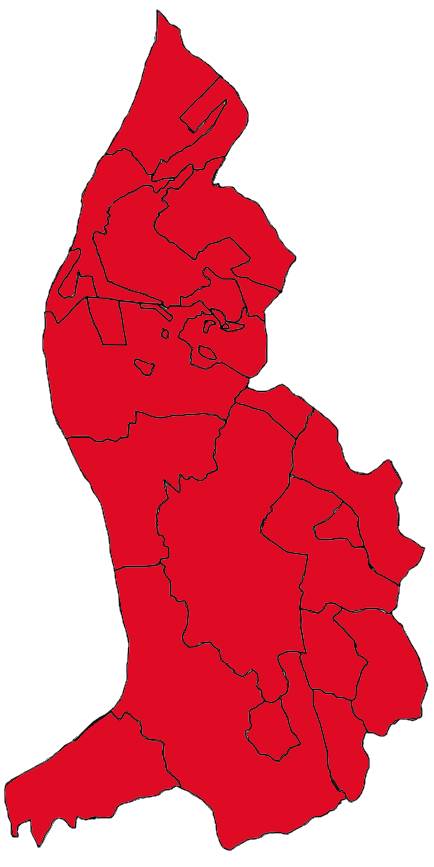
- Results by municipality

Three referendums were held in Liechtenstein in 2002. The first two were held on 10 March on amending the constitution on sustainable transport and raising money for the "Little Big One" musical festival, both of which were rejected by voters. The third referendum was held on 29 September on the law on land-use planning and was rejected by 74% of voters.

== Results ==
=== March ===
Question	For		Against		Invalid/ blank	Total votes	Registered voters	Turnout	Outcome
Question	Votes	%	Votes	%	Invalid/ blank	Total votes	Registered voters	Turnout	Outcome
Amendment to the constitution regarding sustainable transport	4,767	45.48	5,714	54.52	286	10,769	16,671	64.60	Rejected
Raising funds for the Little Big One music festival	3,621	34.20	6,968	65.80	181	10,768	16,671	64.59	Rejected
Source: Nohlen & Stöver

=== September ===
Land-use planning
Choice	Votes	%
For	2,620	25.73
Against	7,561	74.27
Total	10,181	100.00
Valid votes	10,181	98.37
Invalid/blank votes	169	1.63
Total votes	10,350	100.00
Registered voters/turnout	16,805	61.59
Source: Nohlen & Stöver
