= Niels Nielsen Vogt =

Norwegian priest and politician

Niels Nielsen Vogt (10 February 1798 – 6 March 1869) was a Norwegian priest and politician.

He was the son of Niels Nielsen Vogt, Sr. (1755–1809), and a brother of priest and politicians David and Jørgen Herman Vogt. He was an uncle of Volrath Vogt and Nils Vogt.

He was the father of chief physician Peter Herman Vogt and engineer Jens Theodor Paludan Vogt, father-in-law of Johanne Vogt and grandfather of poet Nils Collett Vogt.

He was elected to the Norwegian Parliament in 1839, representing the constituency of Søndre Bergenhus Amt, where he worked as a vicar. He only served one term.
