= David Vogt =

Norwegian politician

David Vogt (2 May 1793 – 6 June 1861) was a Norwegian politician.

== Biography ==
He was the son of Niels Nielsen Vogt Sr. (1755–1809), and a brother of priest and politician Niels Nielsen Vogt and politician Jørgen Herman Vogt. He was an uncle of Volrath Vogt, Nils Vogt and Jens Theodor Paludan Vogt.

He was the father of Colonel Carl Jacob Vogt and physician Olaus Fredrik Sand Vogt, grandfather of professor of medicine Jørgen Herman Vogt, metallurgist Johan Herman Lie Vogt and professor of medicine Ragnar Vogt, and great-grandfather of newspaper editor and politician Jørgen Vogt.

He was elected to the Norwegian Parliament in 1836, representing the constituency of Moss. He was the stipendiary magistrate (byfoged) in that city. He was re-elected in 1839, 1842, 1845 and 1848.
