= Nils Collett Vogt bibliography =

Nils Collett Vogt (1864–1937) was a Norwegian poet. Below is a list of his works, sorted chronologically by year of publication.

== Poetry ==
- Digt, 1887.
- Fra Vaar til Høst, 1894.
- Musik og Vaar, 1896.
- Det dyre Brød, 1900.
- Fra Kristiania, 1904.
- Septemberbrand, 1907.
- Digte i udvalg, 1908.
- Hjemkomst, 1917.
- Ned fra Bjerget, 1924.
- Vind og Bølge, 1927.
- Et liv i dikt, 1930.

== Fiction ==
- Familiens sorg, novel, 1889.
- Harriet Blich, narrative, 1902
- Mennesker, novels, 1903.
- Paa reise: skildringer fra ind- og udland, 1907.
- Smaa breve fra Finnmarken, 1918.
- Levende og døde, essays, 1922.
- Fra gutt til mann, autobiography, 1932.
- Oplevelser, autobiography, 1934.

== Drama ==
- To mennesker, 1904.
- Naar Musikken dør: Skuespil i fire Akter, 1909.
- Spændte sind; to skuespil, 1910.
- Moren, 1913.
- Therese, 1914.
- De Skadeskudte, 1916.
- Karneval, 1920.
- Forbi er forbi, 1929.
