= Sustainable transport =

Transport with sustainable social and environmental impacts

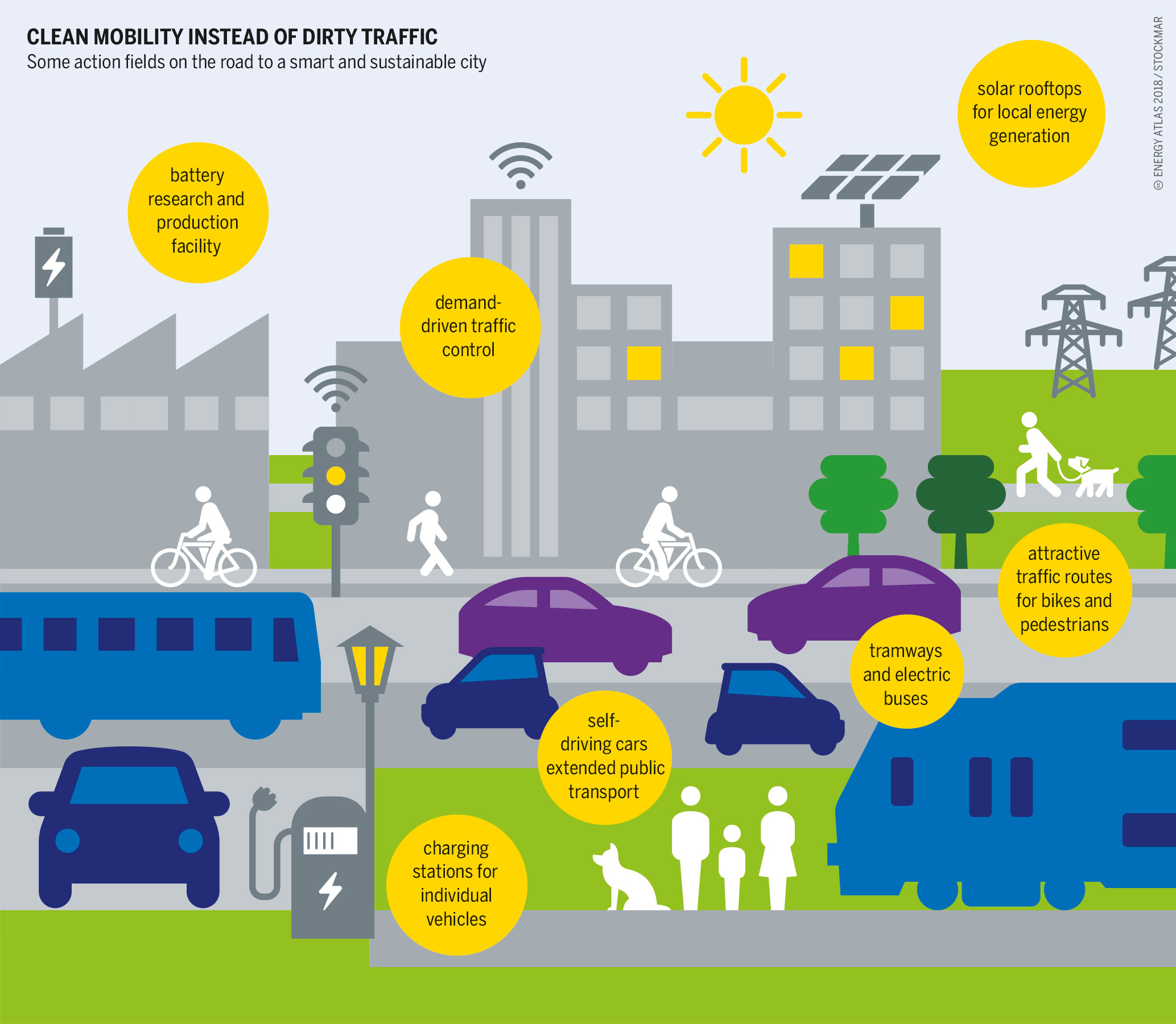
Possible scenario of clean mobility

Sustainable transport is transportation sustainable in terms of its social and environmental impacts. Components for evaluating sustainability include the particular vehicles used; the source of energy; and the infrastructure used to accommodate the transport (streets and roads, railways, airways, waterways and canals). Transportation sustainability is largely being measured by transportation system effectiveness, efficiency, and the environmental and climate impacts of the system. Transport systems have significant impacts on the environment. In 2018, it contributed to around 20% of global CO_{2} emissions. Greenhouse gas emissions from transport are increasing at a faster rate than any other energy using sector.

A 2023 study published in Journal of Transport Geography found that shared electric bicycle systems reduce urban transport-related carbon emissions by about 108–120 grams per kilometer, particularly in non-central urban areas and when powered by low-carbon electricity sources. Road transport is also a major contributor to local air pollution and smog.

Sustainable transport systems make a positive contribution to the environmental, social, and economic sustainability of the communities they serve. Transport systems exist to provide social and economic connections, and people quickly take up the opportunities offered by increased mobility, with poor households benefiting greatly from low carbon transport options. The advantages of increased mobility need to be weighed against the environmental, social and economic costs that transport systems pose. Short-term activity often promotes incremental improvement in fuel efficiency and vehicle emissions controls. Long-term goals include migrating transportation from fossil-based energy to other alternatives, such as renewable energy and use of other renewable resources. The entire life cycle of transport systems is subject to sustainability measurement and optimization.

The United Nations Environment Programme (UNEP) estimates that each year 2.4 million premature deaths from outdoor air pollution could be avoided. Particularly hazardous for health are emissions of black carbon, a component of particulate matter, which is a known cause of respiratory and carcinogenic diseases and a significant contributor to global climate change. The links between greenhouse gas emissions and particulate matter make low carbon transport an increasingly sustainable investment at local level—both by reducing emission levels and thus mitigating climate change; and by improving public health through better air quality. The term "green mobility" also refers to clean ways of movement or sustainable transport.

The social costs of transport include road crashes, air pollution, physical inactivity, time taken away from the family while commuting, and vulnerability to fuel price increases. Traffic congestion imposes economic costs by wasting people's time and by slowing the delivery of goods and services. Traditional transport planning aims to improve mobility, especially for vehicles, and may fail to adequately consider wider impacts. But the real purpose of transport is access – to work, education, goods and services, friends and family – and there are proven techniques to improve access while simultaneously reducing environmental and social impacts, and managing traffic congestion. Communities which are successfully improving the sustainability of their transport networks are doing so as part of a wider program of creating more vibrant, livable, sustainable cities.

== Definition ==
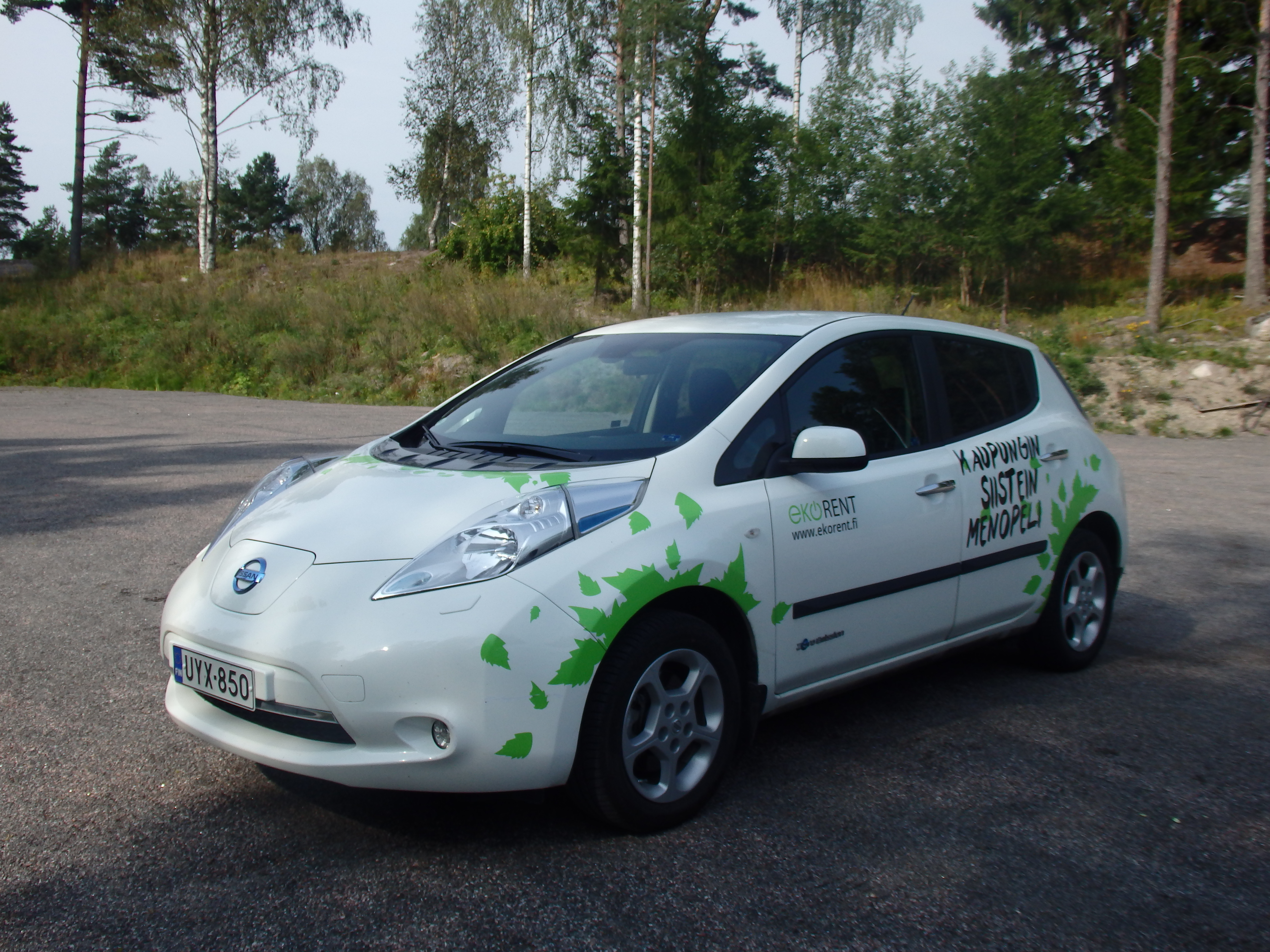
Ekorent's electric car in Helsinki, Finland

The term sustainable transport came into use as a logical follow-on from sustainable development, and it describes modes of transport, and systems of transport planning, which are consistent with wider concerns of sustainability. There are many definitions of the sustainable transport, and of the related terms sustainable transportation and sustainable mobility. One such definition, from the European Union Council of Ministers of Transport, defines a sustainable transportation system as one that:

- Allows the basic access and development needs of individuals, companies and society to be met safely and in a manner consistent with human and ecosystem health, and promotes equity within and between successive generations.
- Is affordable, operates fairly and efficiently, offers a choice of transport mode, and supports a competitive economy, as well as balanced regional development.
- Limits emissions and waste within the planet's ability to absorb them, uses renewable resources at or below their rates of generation, and uses non-renewable resources at or below the rates of development of renewable substitutes, while minimizing the impact on the use of land and the generation of noise.

Sustainability extends beyond just the operating efficiency and emissions. A life-cycle assessment involves production, use and post-use considerations. A cradle-to-cradle design is more important than a focus on a single factor such as energy efficiency.

== Benefits ==
Sustainable transport has many social and economic benefits that can accelerate local sustainable development. According to a series of serious reports by the Low Emission Development Strategies Global Partnership (LEDS GP), sustainable transport can help create jobs, improve commuter safety through investment in bicycle lanes, pedestrian pathways and non-pedestrian pathways, make access to employment and social opportunities more affordable and efficient. It also offers a practical opportunity to save people's time and household income as well as government budgets, making investment in sustainable transport a 'win-win' opportunity.

== Environmental impact ==
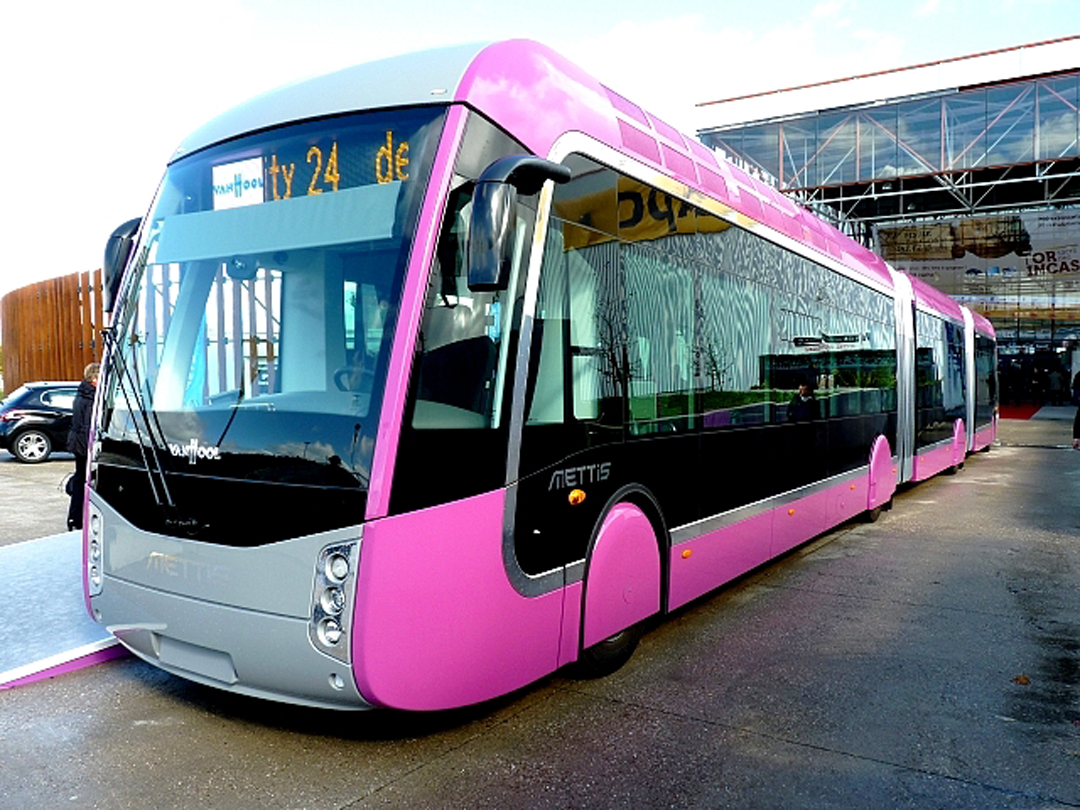
The bus rapid transit of Metz uses a diesel-electric hybrid driving system, developed by Belgian Van Hool manufacturer.

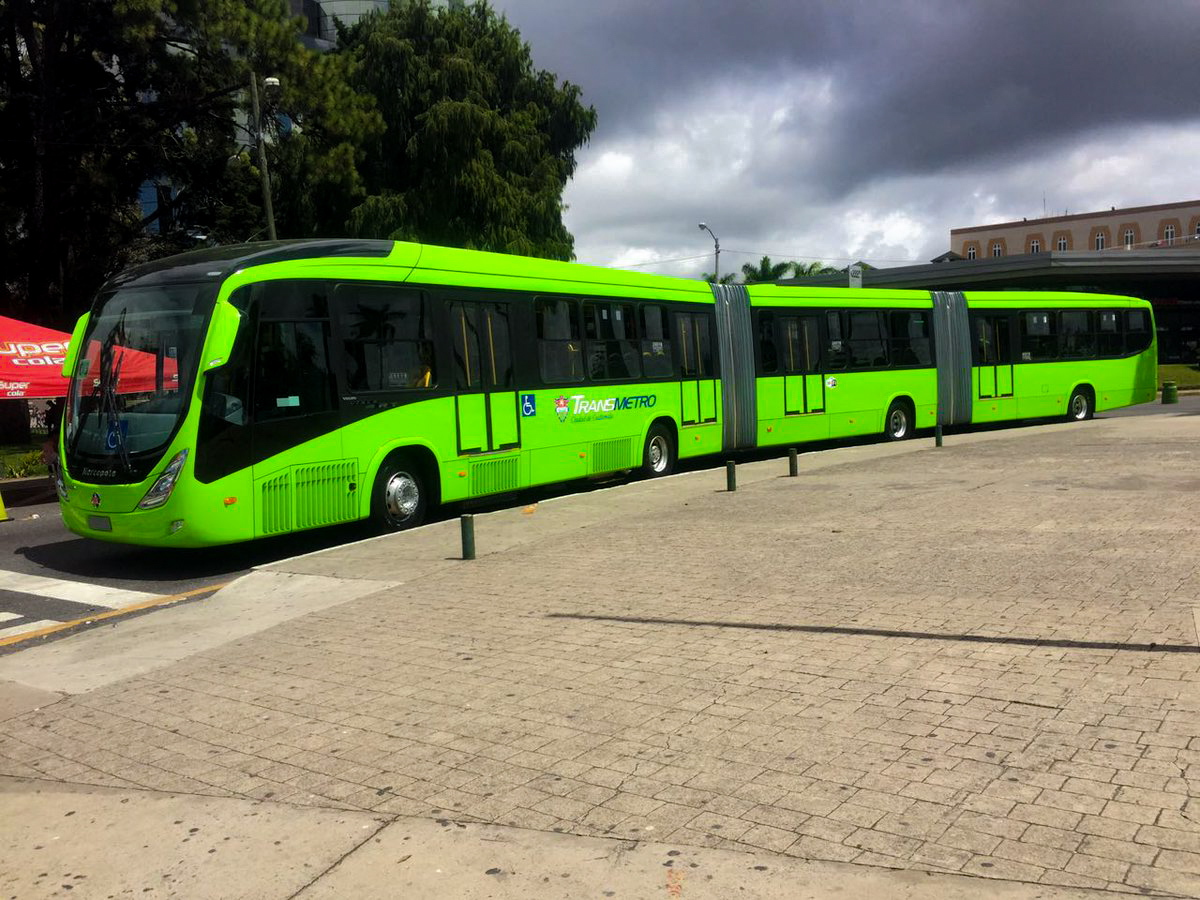
Electric Transmetro in Guatemala City

Transport systems are major emitters of greenhouse gases, responsible for 23% of world energy-related GHG emissions in 2004, with about three-quarters coming from road vehicles. Data from 2011 stated that one-third of all greenhouse gases produced are due to transportation. Currently 95% of transport energy comes from petroleum. Energy is consumed in the manufacture as well as the use of vehicles, and is embodied in transport infrastructure including roads, bridges and railways. Motorized transport also releases exhaust fumes that contain particulate matter which is hazardous to human health and a contributor to climate change.

The first historical attempts of evaluating the Life Cycle environmental impact of vehicle were due to Theodore Von Karman. After decades in which all the analysis has been focused on emending the Von Karman model, Dewulf and Van Langenhove have introduced a model based on the second law of thermodynamics and exergy analysis. Chester and Orwath, have developed a similar model based on the first law that accounts the necessary costs for the infrastructure.

The environmental impacts of transport can be reduced by reducing the weight of vehicles, sustainable styles of driving, reducing the friction of tires, encouraging electric and hybrid vehicles, improving the walking and cycling environment in cities, and by enhancing the role of public transport, especially electric rail.

For example, a frequently cited 2006 study by Lawrence D. Frank and his co-authors, Many Pathways from Land Use to Health, demonstrated that a 5% increase in walkability was associated with many benefits, including a 6.5% reduction in vehicle miles driven, a 5.6% reduction in grams of nitrogen oxides emissions, and a 5.5% emission reduction of volatile organic compounds (VOCs).

Green vehicles are intended to have less environmental impact than equivalent standard vehicles, although when the environmental impact of a vehicle is assessed over the whole of its life cycle this may not be the case.

Electric vehicle technology significantly reduces transport CO_{2} emissions when comparing battery electric vehicles (BEVs) with equivalent internal combustion engine vehicles (ICEVs). The extent to which it does this depends on the embodied energy of the vehicle and the source of the electricity. Lifecycle greenhouse gas emission reductions from BEVs are significant, even in countries with relatively high shares of coal in their electricity generation mix, such as China and India. As a specific example, a Nissan Leaf in the UK in 2019 produced one third of the greenhouse gases than the average internal combustion car.

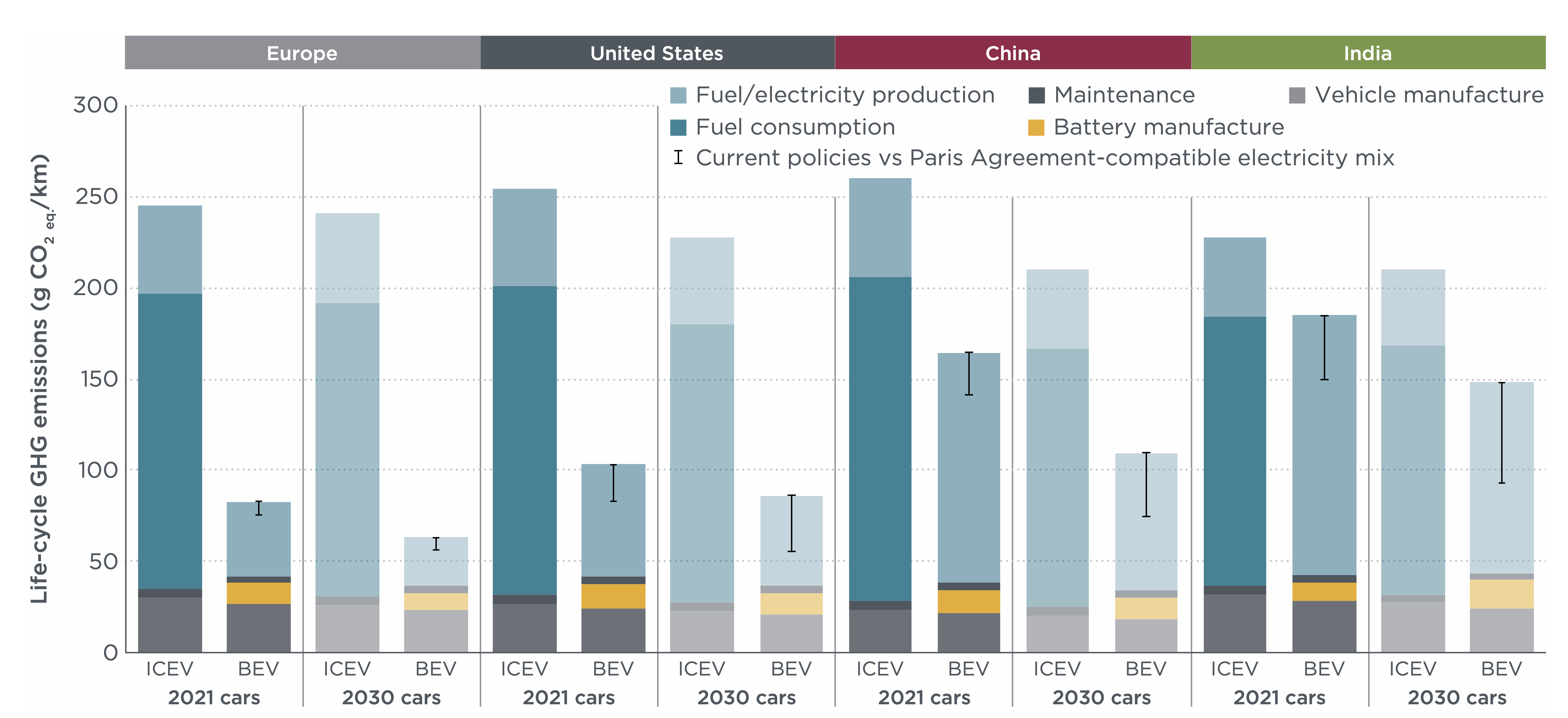
Even in countries where electricity is largely generated from coal, such as China and India, battery-electric vehicles (BEVs) have lower lifecycle greenhouse gas emissions. The advantages of BEVs will further increase by 2030 as countries increasingly adopt clean electricity sources.

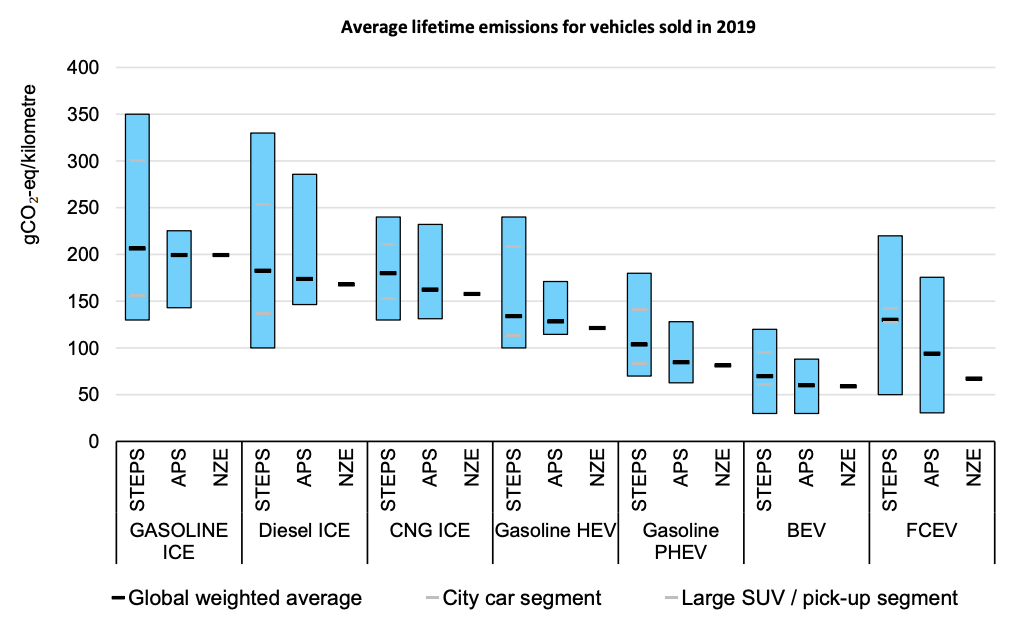
Battery electric vehicles have lower lifecycle emissions than other vehicle types. Abbreviations used in this chart: - ICE(V): internal combustion engine vehicle, CNG: compressed natural gas, HEV: hybrid electric vehicle, BEV: battery electric vehicle, PHEV: plugin hybrid electric vehicle, FCEV: fuel cell vehicle, STEPS: IEA's Stated Policies Scenario, APS: IEA's Announced Pledges Scenario, NZE: IEA's Net Zero Emissions by 2050 Scenario.

The Online Electric Vehicle (OLEV), developed by the Korea Advanced Institute of Science and Technology (KAIST), is an electric vehicle that can be charged while stationary or driving, thus removing the need to stop at a charging station. The City of Gumi in South Korea runs a 24 km roundtrip along which the bus will receive 100 kW (136 horsepower) electricity at an 85% maximum power transmission efficiency rate while maintaining a 17 cm air gap between the underbody of the vehicle and the road surface. At that power, only a few sections of the road need embedded cables. Hybrid vehicles, which use an internal combustion engine combined with an electric engine to achieve better fuel efficiency than a regular combustion engine, are already common.

Natural gas is also used as a transport fuel, but is a less promising technology as it is still a fossil fuel and still has significant emissions (though lower than gasoline, diesel, etc.).

Brazil met 17% of its transport fuel needs from bioethanol in 2007, but the OECD has warned that the success of (first-generation) biofuels in Brazil is due to specific local circumstances. Internationally, first-generation biofuels are forecast to have little or no impact on greenhouse emissions, at significantly higher cost than energy efficiency measures. The later generation biofuels however (2nd to 4th generation) do have significant environmental benefit, as they are no driving force for deforestation or struggle with the food vs fuel issue.

In practice there is a sliding scale of green transport depending on the sustainability of the option. Green vehicles are more fuel-efficient, but only in comparison with standard vehicles, and they still contribute to traffic congestion and road crashes. Well-patronized public transport networks based on traditional diesel buses use less fuel per passenger than private vehicles, and are generally safer and use less road space than private vehicles. Green public transport vehicles including electric trains, trams and electric buses combine the advantages of green vehicles with those of sustainable transport choices. Other transport choices with very low environmental impact are cycling and other human-powered vehicles, and animal powered transport. The most common green transport choice, with the least environmental impact is walking.

Transport on rails boasts an excellent efficiency (see fuel efficiency in transportation).

== Transport and social sustainability ==
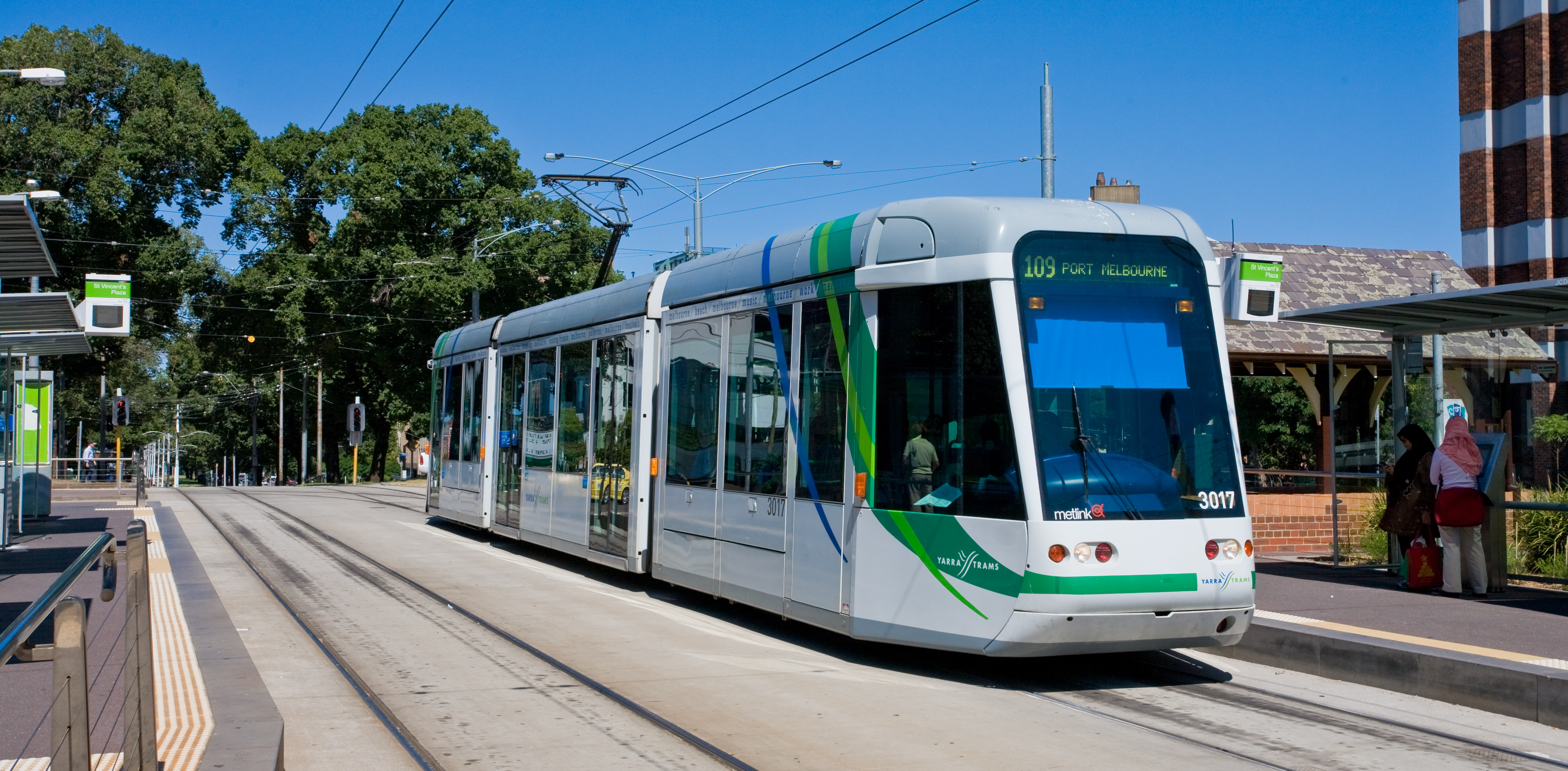
A tram in Melbourne, Australia

Cities with overbuilt roadways have experienced unintended consequences, linked to radical drops in public transport, walking, and cycling. In many cases, streets became void of "life." Stores, schools, government centers and libraries moved away from central cities, and residents who did not flee to the suburbs experienced a much reduced quality of public space and of public services. As schools were closed their mega-school replacements in outlying areas generated additional traffic; the number of cars on US roads between 7:15 and 8:15 a.m. increases 30% during the school year.

Yet another impact was an increase in sedentary lifestyles, causing and complicating a national epidemic of obesity, and accompanying dramatically increased health care costs.

Car-based transport systems present barriers to employment in low-income neighborhoods, with many low-income individuals and families forced to use cars they cannot afford to maintain their income. This is also referred to as forced car ownership.

These effects are spread unevenly across people and places, resulting in a transport divide.

== Potential shift to sustainable transport in developing countries ==
In developing countries such as Uganda, researchers have sought to determine factors that could possibly influence travelers to opt for bicycles as an alternative to motorcycle taxis (boda boda). The findings suggest that generally, the age, gender, and ability of the individual to cycle in the first place are key determinants of their willingness to shift to a more sustainable mode. Transport system improvements that could reduce the perceived risks of cycling were also seen to be the most impactful changes that could contribute towards the greater use of bicycles.

== Cities ==
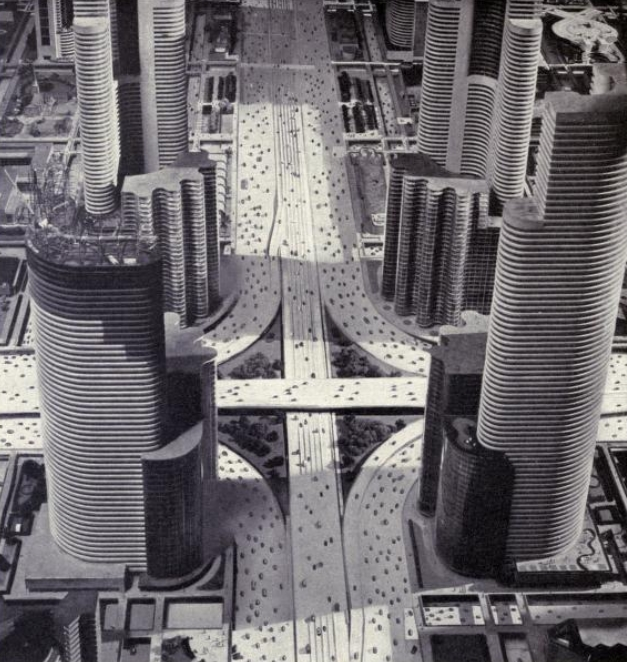
Futurama, an exhibit at the 1939 New York World's Fair, was sponsored by General Motors and showed a vision of the City of Tomorrow.

Cities are shaped by their transport systems. In The City in History, Lewis Mumford documented how the location and layout of cities was shaped around a walkable center, often located near a port or waterway, and with suburbs accessible by animal transport or, later, by rail or tram lines.

In 1939, the New York World's Fair included a model of an imagined city, built around a car-based transport system. In this "greater and better world of tomorrow", residential, commercial and industrial areas were separated, and skyscrapers loomed over a network of urban motorways. These ideas captured the popular imagination, and are credited with influencing city planning from the 1940s to the 1970s.

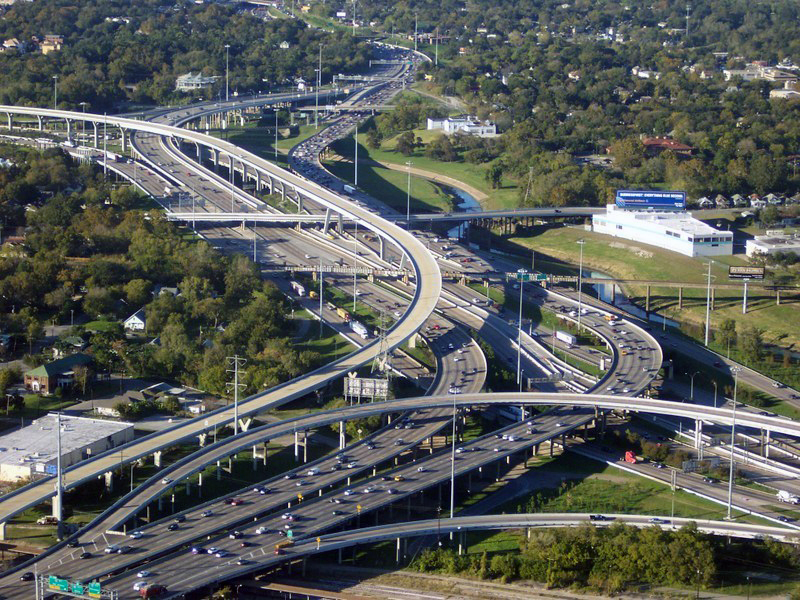
Interstate 10 and Interstate 45 near downtown Houston, Texas.

The emergence of the car in the post-war era led to major changes in the structure and function of cities. There was some opposition to these changes at the time. The writings of Jane Jacobs, in particular The Death and Life of Great American Cities provide a poignant reminder of what was lost in this transformation, and a record of community efforts to resist these changes. Lewis Mumford asked "is the city for cars or for people?" Donald Appleyard documented the consequences for communities of increasing car traffic in "The View from the Road" (1964) and in the UK, Mayer Hillman first published research into the impacts of traffic on child independent mobility in 1971. Despite these notes of caution, trends in car ownership, car use and fuel consumption continued steeply upward throughout the post-war period.

Mainstream transport planning in Europe has, by contrast, never been based on assumptions that the private car was the best or only solution for urban mobility. For example, the Dutch Transport Structure Scheme has since the 1970s required that demand for additional vehicle capacity only be met "if the contribution to societal welfare is positive", and since 1990 has included an explicit target to halve the rate of growth in vehicle traffic. Some cities outside Europe have also consistently linked transport to sustainability and to land-use planning, notably Curitiba, Brazil, Portland, Oregon and Vancouver, Canada.

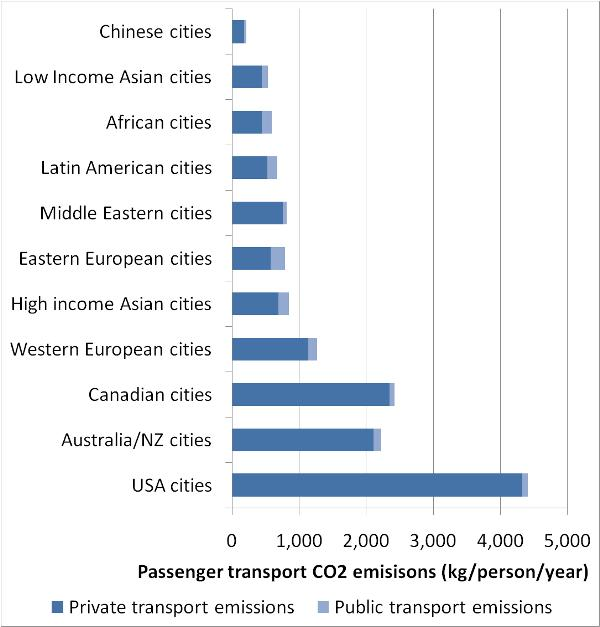
Greenhouse gas emissions from transport vary widely, even for cities of comparable wealth. Source: UITP, Mobility in Cities Database.

There are major differences in transport energy consumption between cities; an average U.S. urban dweller uses 24 times more energy annually for private transport than a Chinese urban resident, and almost four times as much as a European urban dweller. These differences cannot be explained by wealth alone but are closely linked to the rates of walking, cycling, and public transport use and to enduring features of the city including urban density and urban design.

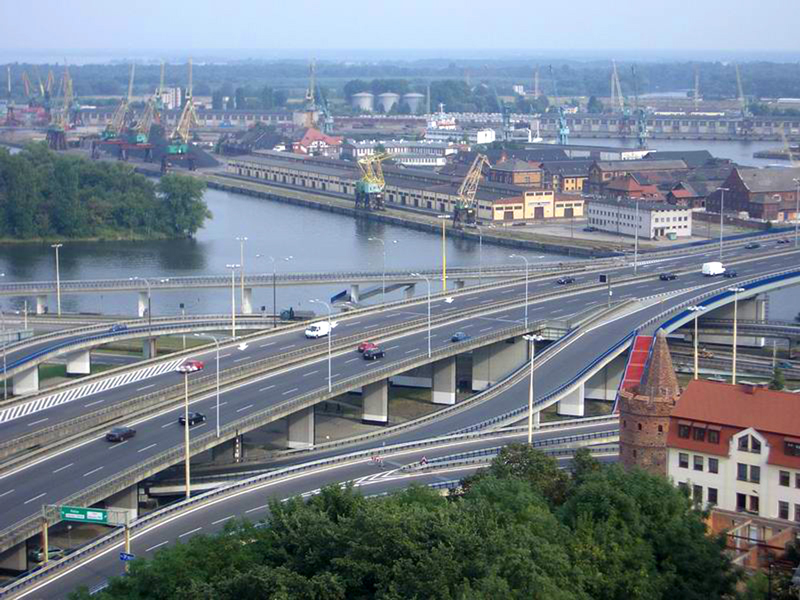
A bypass in the Old Town in Szczecin, Poland.

The cities and nations that have invested most heavily in car-based transport systems are now the least environmentally sustainable, as measured by per capita fossil fuel use. The social and economic sustainability of car-based transportation engineering has also been questioned. Within the United States, residents of sprawling cities make more frequent and longer car trips, while residents of traditional urban neighborhoods make a similar number of trips, but travel shorter distances and walk, cycle and use transit more often. It has been calculated that New York City residents save $19 billion each year simply by owning fewer cars and driving less than the average American. A less car intensive means of urban transport is carsharing, which is becoming popular in North America and Europe, and according to The Economist, carsharing can reduce car ownership at an estimated rate of one rental car replacing 15 owned vehicles. Car sharing has also begun in the developing world, where traffic and urban density is often worse than in developed countries. Companies like Zoom in India, eHi in China, and Carrot in Mexico, are bringing car-sharing to developing countries in an effort to reduce car-related pollution, ameliorate traffic, and expand the number of people who have access to cars.

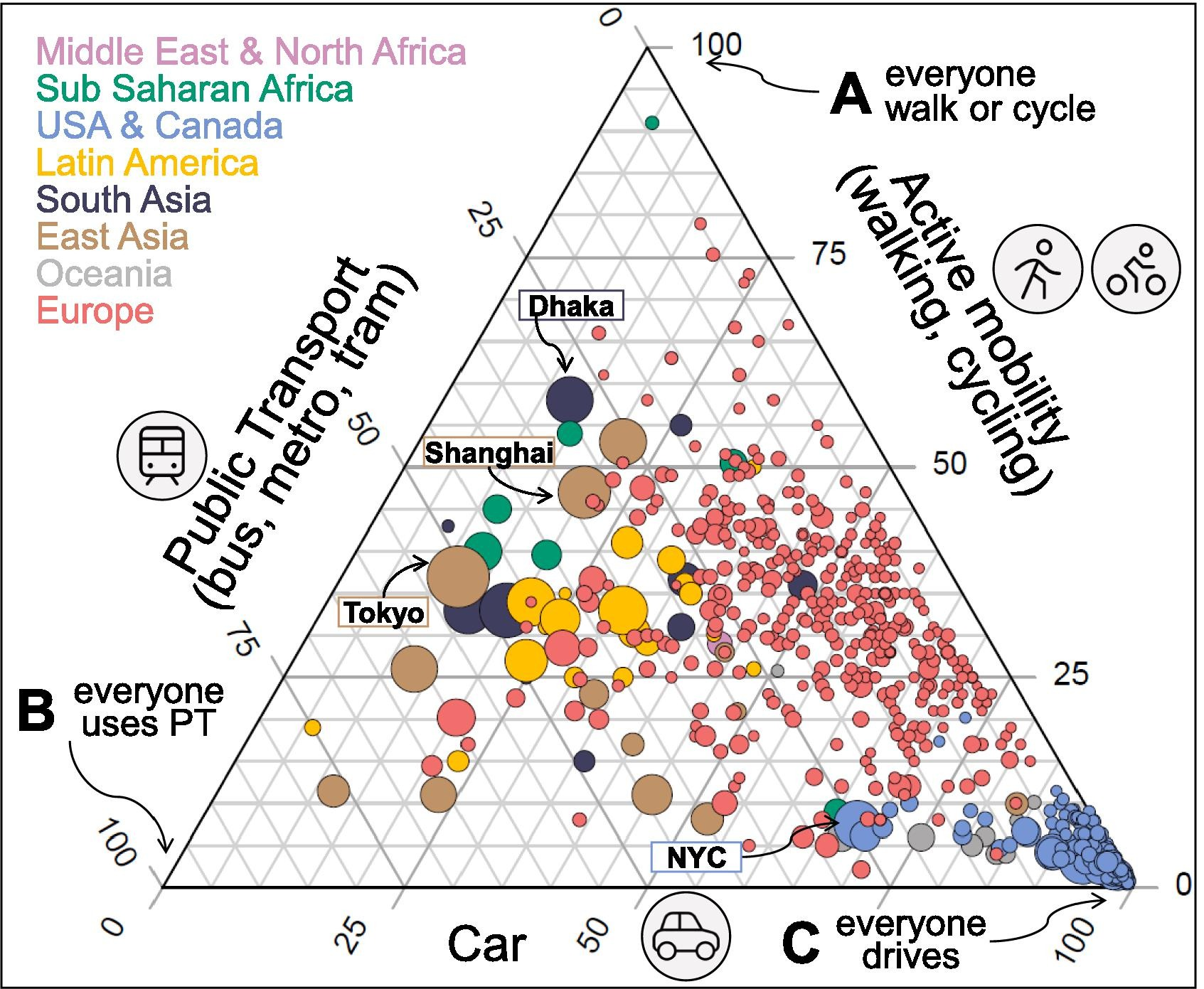
A ternary plot displaying the modes of transport in 794 cities.

The European Commission adopted the Action Plan on urban mobility on 30 September 2009 for sustainable urban mobility. The European Commission will conduct a review of the implementation of the Action Plan in the year 2012, and will assess the need for further action. In 2007, 72% of the European population lived in urban areas, which are key to growth and employment. Cities need efficient transport systems to support their economy and the welfare of their inhabitants. Around 85% of the EU's GDP is generated in cities. Urban areas face today the challenge of making transport sustainable in environmental (CO_{2}, air pollution, noise) and competitiveness (congestion) terms while at the same time addressing social concerns. These range from the need to respond to health problems and demographic trends, fostering economic and social cohesion to taking into account the needs of persons with reduced mobility, families and children.

The C40 Cities Climate Leadership Group (C40) is a group of 94 cities around the world driving urban action that reduces greenhouse gas emissions and climate risks, while increasing the health and wellbeing of urban citizens. In October 2019, by signing the C40 Clean Air Cities Declaration, 35 mayors recognized that breathing clean air is a human right and committed to work together to form a global coalition for clean air. Papers have been written showing with satellite data that cities with subway systems produce much less greenhouse gas.

Bogotá, Colombia's centerpiece of the city's approach to sustainable transport is the TransMilenio Bus Rapid Transit (BRT) system.

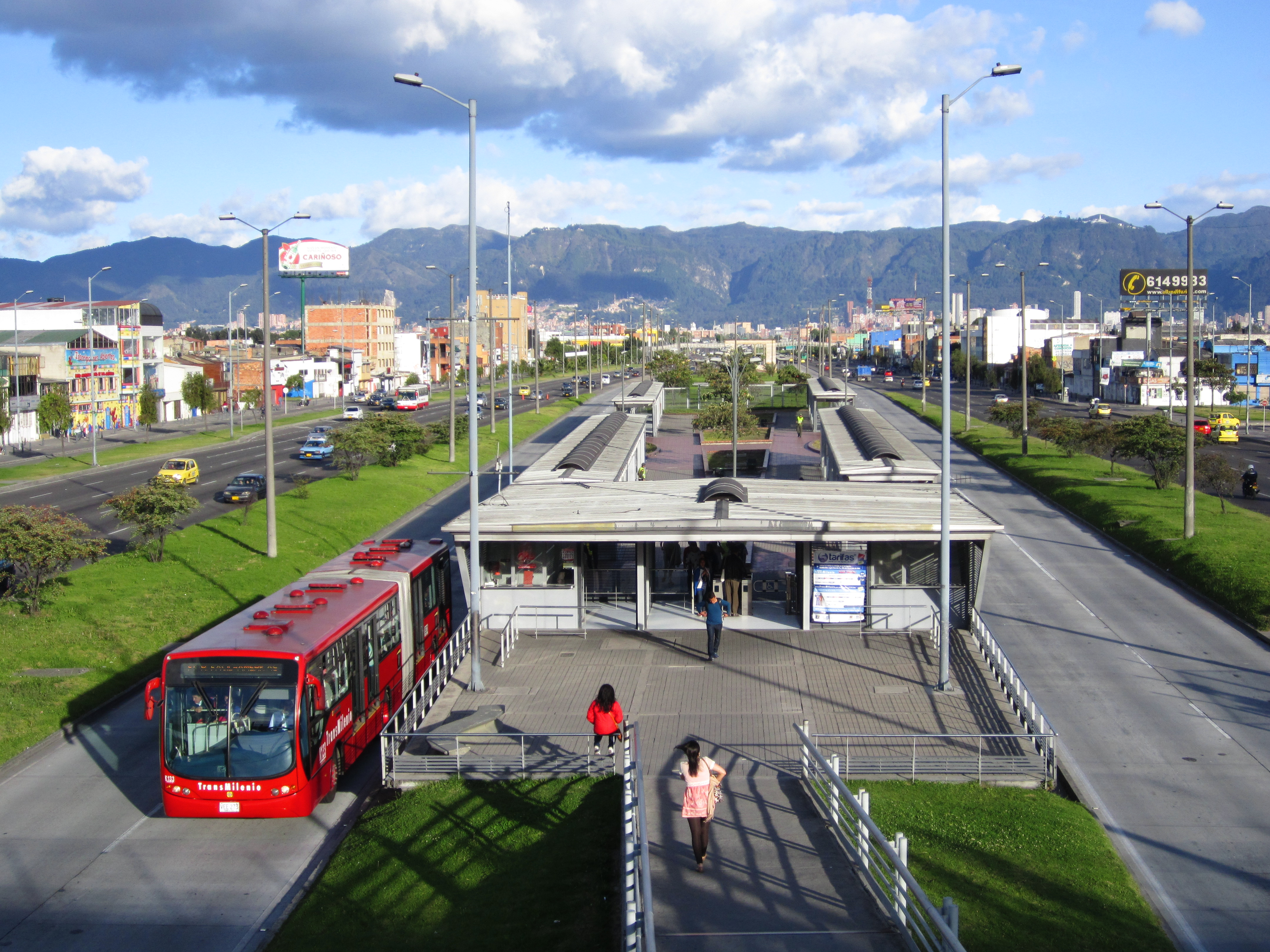
Bus Rapid Transit in Bogotá, Colombia

This BRT, launched in 2000, quickly become a global model for high-capacity public transport.

This form of transportation is efficient in its ridership. It has a high passenger capacity, carrying up to between 43,000-48,000 "passengers per hour per direction on its busiest sections." The buses run on exclusive, separate lanes, avoiding traffic congestions. People pay before they enter the station speeding up boarding times, and the system uses large articulated buses.

Bogotá is also home to one of the world's most extensive cycling networks. They include over 560 kilometers of dedicated bike lanes. They also promote non-motor travel with events like Ciclovía.

== Policies and governance ==
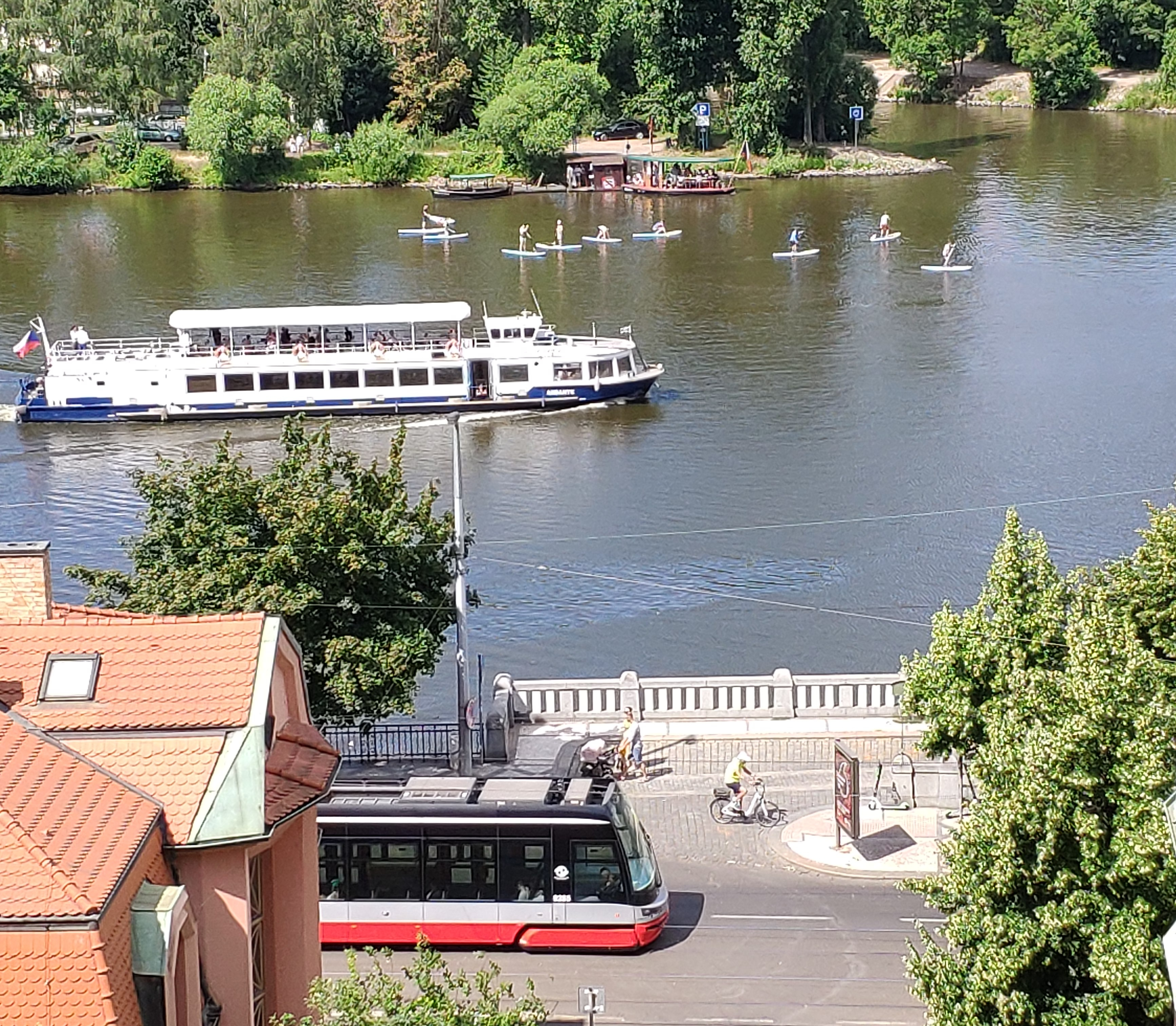
Seven sustainable transportations in one photo (Prague).

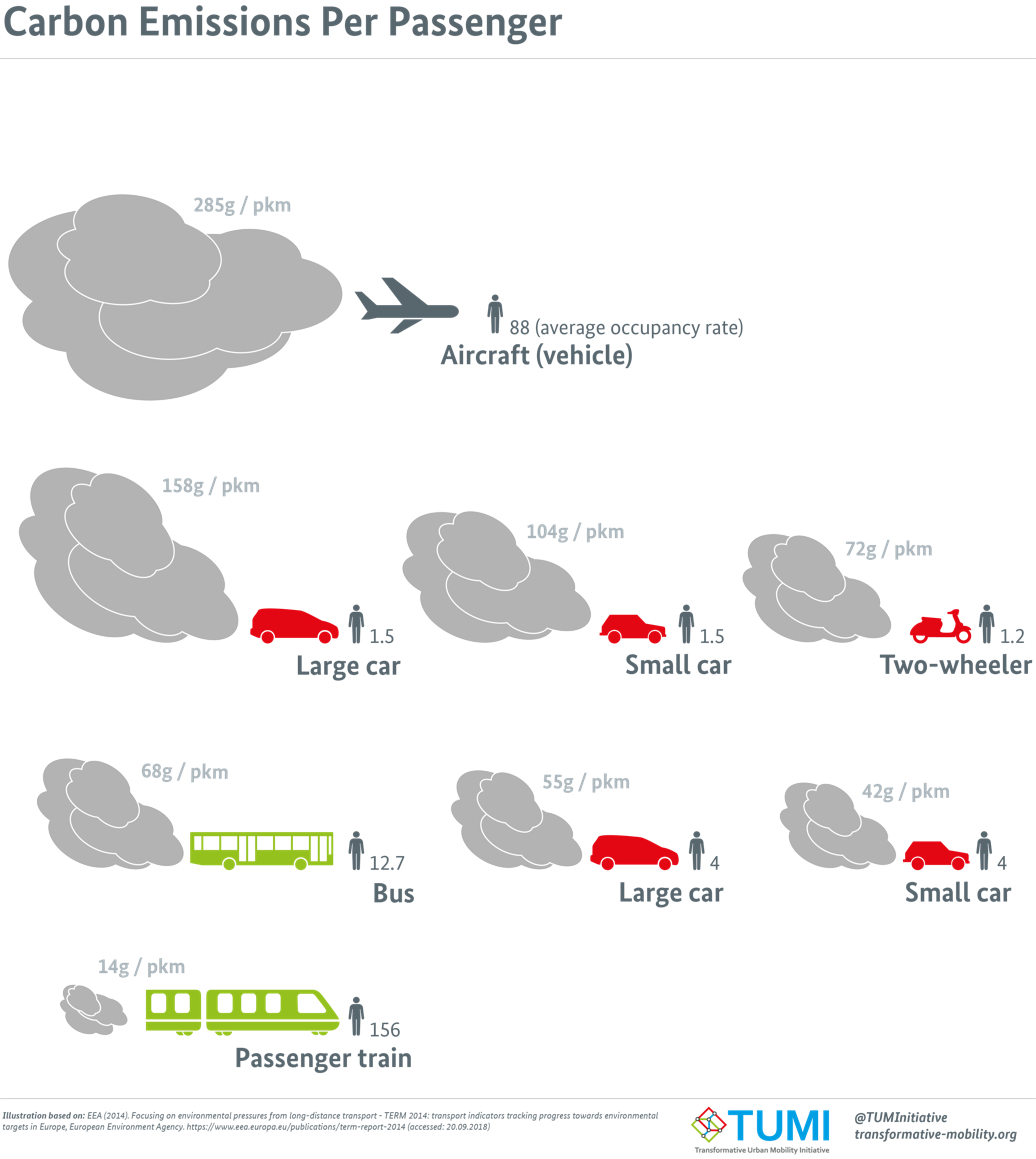
Carbon emissions per passenger

=== By country ===
==== Belgium ====
Brussels has pursued sustainable urban mobility through its Good Move Regional Mobility Plan, approved in 2020. The initiative aimed at improving residents' quality of life by reducing car dependency, promoting walking and cycling, improving public transport and creating more accessible public spaces. According to Brussels' statistics, between 2010 and 2024, the share of journeys made by bicycle increased from 3.4% to 8.5%, while public transport rose from 22.5% to 27%. Conversely, the share of journeys made by car drivers declined from 28.2% to 21.7%. Shared mobility also expanded, reaching approximately 8,000 daily shared bicycle uses and 5,700 shared car uses in 2024.

==== United Kingdom ====
In 2008, the UK Government released the Climate Change Act, which legislated an 80% reduction of greenhouse gas emissions by 2050, compared to a baseline of 1990. In 2019, the Climate Change Act was amended, and it now mandates a 100% reduction of emissions by 2050. This brings a net zero target.

In 2021, the UK Department for Transport published their transport decarbonisation plan called "Decarbonising Transport. A better, greener Britain". This plan outlines how the UK transport sector will decarbonise by 2050. The six key strategic priorities therein revolve around modal shift to active and public transport, decarbonised road transport, freight transport, innovation, place-based solutions, and aviation and shipping.

In 2021 the Institute for Public Policy Research issued a statement saying that car use in the United Kingdom must shrink while active transport and public transport should be used more. The Department for Transport responded that they will spend 2 billion pounds on active transport, more than ever, including making England and the rest of the UK's railways greener. UK studies have shown that a modal shift to rail from air could result in a sixtyfold reduction in CO_{2} emissions.

==== Germany ====
Some Western countries are making transportation more sustainable in both long-term and short-term implementations. An example is the modification in available transportation in Freiburg, Germany. The city has implemented extensive methods of public transportation, cycling, and walking, along with large areas where cars are not allowed.

==== United States ====
Since many Western countries are highly automobile-oriented, the main transit that people use is personal vehicles. About 80% of their travel involves cars. Therefore, automobiles are one of the highest greenhouse gases emitters in the United States. The federal government has to come up with some plans to reduce the total number of vehicle trips to lower greenhouse gases emission. These include improving public transport through the provision of larger coverage area in order to provide more mobility and accessibility, new technology to provide a more reliable and responsive public transportation network. They must also encourage walking and biking through the provision of wider pedestrian pathway, bike share stations in downtowns, locate parking lots far from the shopping center, limit on street parking, slower traffic lane in downtown area. Finally, increase the cost of car ownership and gas taxes through increased parking fees and tolls, encouraging people to drive more fuel-efficient vehicles. This can produce a social equity problem, since lower income people usually drive older vehicles with lower fuel efficiency. Government can use the extra revenue collected from taxes and tolls to improve public transportation and benefit poor communities.

Other states and nations have built efforts to translate knowledge in behavioral economics into evidence-based sustainable transportation policies.

==== France ====
In March 2022, an advertising regulation will come into force in France, requiring all advertising materials for automobiles to include one of three standard disclaimers promoting the use of sustainable transport practices. This applies to all vehicles, including electric vehicles. In 2028, it will also become illegal to advertise vehicles which emit more than 128 grams of carbon dioxide per-kilometer.

==== Norway ====
One of Norway’s main sustainable transport policies is its electric vehicle incentive program, introduced progressively from the 1990s. This policy includes several fiscal incentives, particularly exemptions from the 25% VAT and CO₂- and weight-based vehicle registration taxes.

==== Spain ====
Barcelona has implemented three major sustainable mobility policies to reduce car dependency and improve air quality. The Superblocks programme aims to transform streets into green and pedestrian-friendly public spaces, contributing to an increase in pedestrian sidewalk space from 34.4% in 2000 to 45.5% in 2023. The Low Emission Zone, introduced in 2020, restricts highly polluting vehicles across approximately 95 km² and 36 municipalities. Finally, Bicivia, the metropolitan cycling network connecting Barcelona with neighboring municipalities, expanded from 229 km in 2016 to 362 km in 2023.

=== At city level ===
Sustainable transport policies have their greatest impact at the city level.

Some of the biggest cities in Western Europe have a relatively sustainable transport. In Paris 53% of trips are made by walking, 3% by bicycle, 34% by public transport, and only 10% by car. In the entire Ile-de-France region, walking is the most popular way of transportation. In Amsterdam, 28% of trips are made by walking, 31% by bicycle, 18% by public transport and only 23% by car. In Copenhagen 62% of people commute to school or work by bicycle.

Outside Western Europe, cities which have consistently included sustainability as a key consideration in transport and land use planning include Curitiba, Brazil; Bogotá, Colombia; Portland, Oregon, United States; and Vancouver, Canada. The state of Victoria, Australia, passed legislation in 2010 – the Transport Integration Act – to compel its transport agencies to actively consider sustainability issues including climate change impacts in transport policy, planning and operations.

Many other cities throughout the world have recognized the need to link sustainability and transport policies, for example by joining the Cities for Climate Protection program. Some cities are trying to become car-free cities, e.g., limit or exclude the usage of cars.

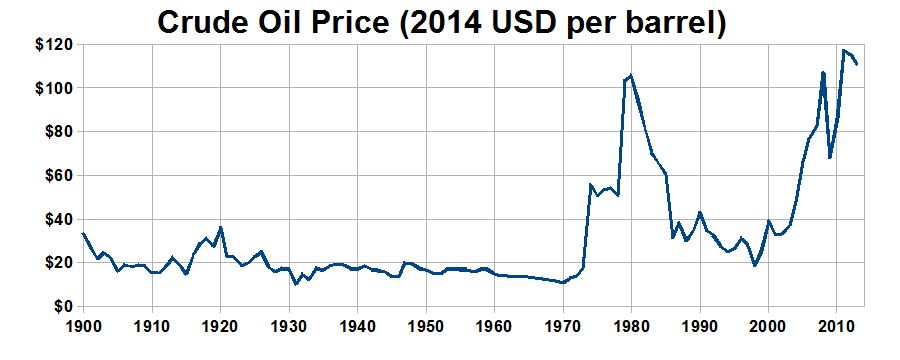
Oil price trend, 1939–2007, both nominal and adjusted to inflation

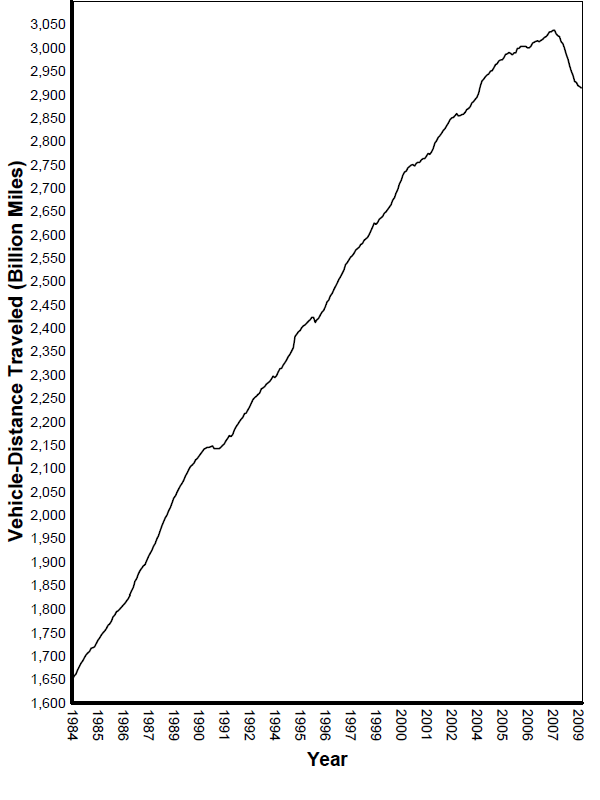
Vehicle-miles traveled in the United States up to March 2009.

In 2020, the COVID-19 pandemic pushed several cities to adopt a plan to drastically increase biking and walking; these included Milan, London, Brighton, and Dublin. These plans were taken to facilitate social distancing by avoiding public transport and at the same time prevent a rise in traffic congestion and air pollution from increase in car use. A similar plan was adopted by New York City and Paris. The pandemic's impact on urban public transportation means revenue declines will put a strain on operators' finances and may cause creditworthiness to worsen. Governments might be forced to subsidize operators with financial transfers, in turn reducing resources available for investment in greener transportation systems.

=== Community and grassroots action ===
Sustainable transport is fundamentally a grassroots movement, albeit one which is now recognized as of citywide, national and international significance.

Whereas it started as a movement driven by environmental concerns, over these last years there has been increased emphasis on social equity and fairness issues, and in particular the need to ensure proper access and services for lower income groups and people with mobility limitations, including the fast-growing population of older citizens. Many of the people exposed to the most vehicle noise, pollution and safety risk have been those who do not own, or cannot drive cars, and those for whom the cost of car ownership causes a severe financial burden.

An organization called Greenxc started in 2011 created a national awareness campaign in the United States encouraging people to carpool by ride-sharing cross country stopping over at various destinations along the way and documenting their travel through video footage, posts and photography. Ride-sharing reduces individual's carbon footprint by allowing several people to use one car instead of everyone using individual cars.

A case study by Prospect Sierra Students regarding lowering carbon emissions by changing means of transportation for students showed percentages of which changes could be made in order to drop the schools total carbon emissions by 15.5%. Within their video presentation, they showed that 50% of drivers were within a 2-mile walk, 30% of drivers were within a carpool radius, and 30% of drivers were within a 2-5 mile carpool radius.

At the beginning of the 21st century, some companies are trying to increase the use of sailing ships, even for commercial purposes, for example, Fairtrannsport and New Dawn Traders They have created the Sail Cargo Alliance.

The European Investment Bank committed €314 million between 2018 and 2022 to green marine transport, funding the building of new ships and the retrofitting of current ships with eco-friendly technologies to increase their energy efficiency and lower harmful emissions. The bank also offered an average of €11 billion per year from 2012 to 2022 for sustainable transportation solutions and climate-friendly initiatives. In 2022, railway projects received around 32% of overall transport loans, while urban mobility received approximately 37%.

== Recent trends ==
The global stock of both plug-in hybrid electric vehicles (PHEVs) and battery electric vehicles (BEVs) has grown steadily since the 2010s.

Sales of electric vehicles (EVs) indicate a trend away from gas-powered vehicles.

Percentage-of-total-sales figures for electric, plug-in hybrid, and hybrid vehicles approximately quadrupled from 2020 to 2026.

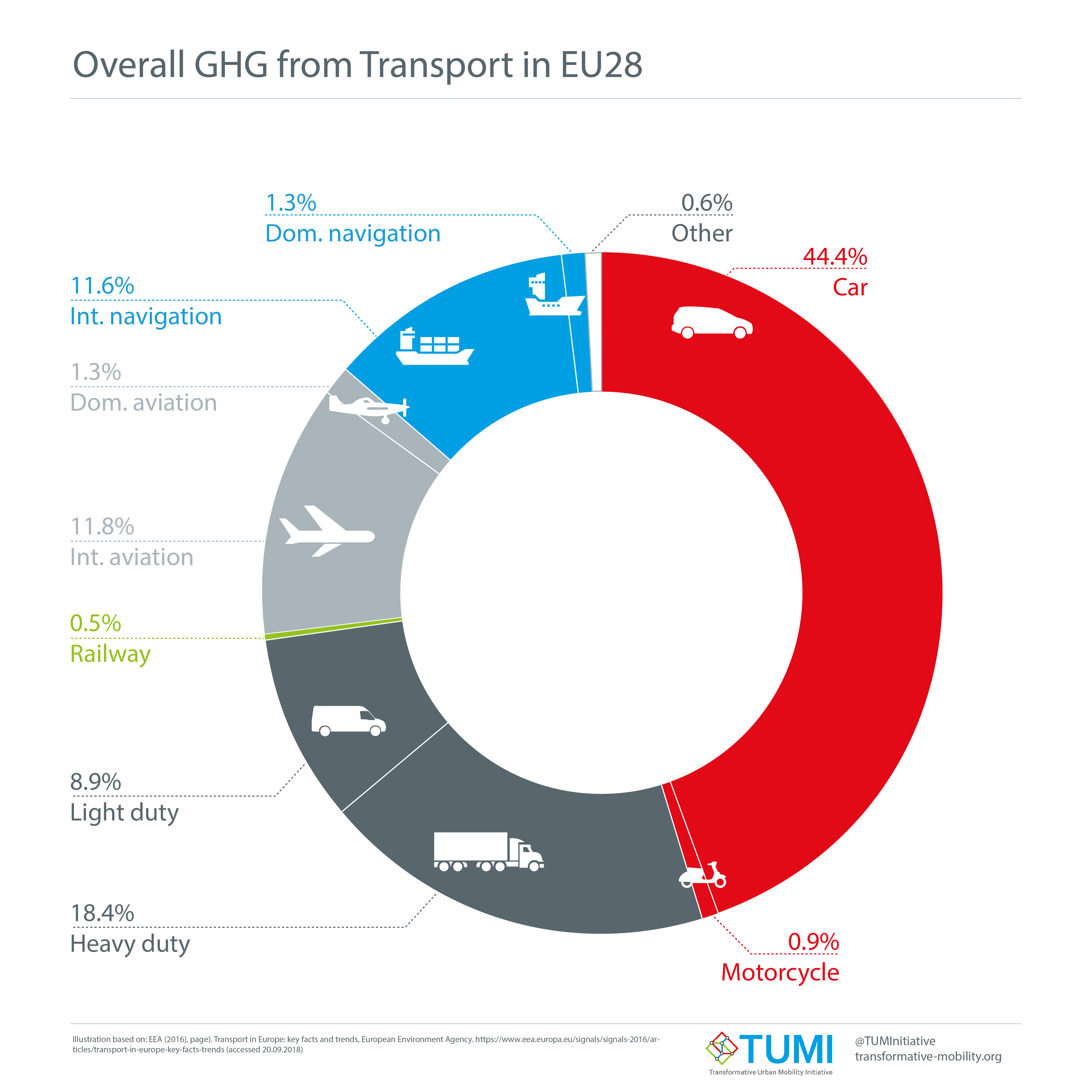
Overall GHG from transport

Car travel increased steadily throughout the twentieth century, but trends since 2000 have been more complex. Oil price rises from 2003 have been linked to a decline in per capita fuel use for private vehicle travel in the US, Britain and Australia. In 2008, global oil consumption fell by 0.8% overall, with significant declines in consumption in North America, Western Europe, and parts of Asia.

Other factors affecting a decline in driving, at least in America, include the retirement of Baby Boomers who now drive less, preference for other travel modes (such as transit) by younger age cohorts, the Great Recession, and the rising use of technology (internet, mobile devices) which have made travel less necessary and possibly less attractive.

=== Greenwashing ===
The term green transport is often used as a greenwash marketing technique for products which are not proven to make a positive contribution to environmental sustainability. Such claims can be legally challenged. For instance the Norwegian Consumer Ombudsman has targeted car manufacturers who claim that their cars are "green", "clean" or "environmentally friendly". Manufacturers risk fines if they fail to drop the words. The Australian Competition & Consumer Commission (ACCC) describes "green" claims on products as "very vague, inviting consumers to give a wide range of meanings to the claim, which risks misleading them". In 2008 the ACCC forced a car retailer to stop its green marketing of Saab cars, which was found by the Australian Federal Court to be "misleading".

=== Innovation ===
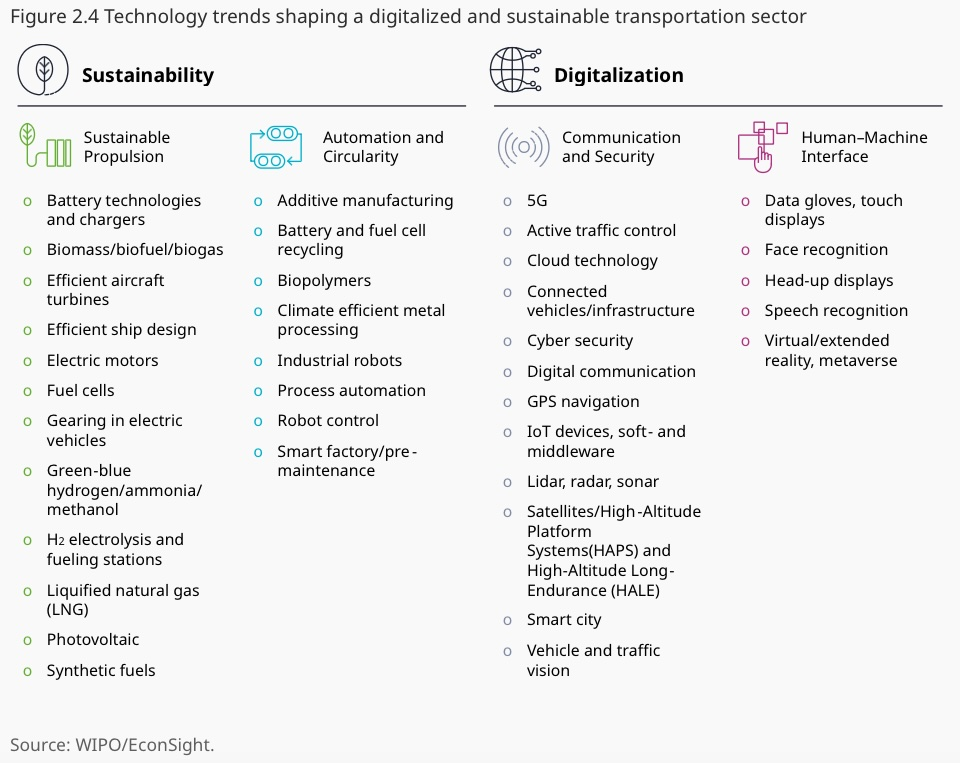
A wide range of technologies are being explored and developed and shape the transportation sector in direction of sustainability and digitization.

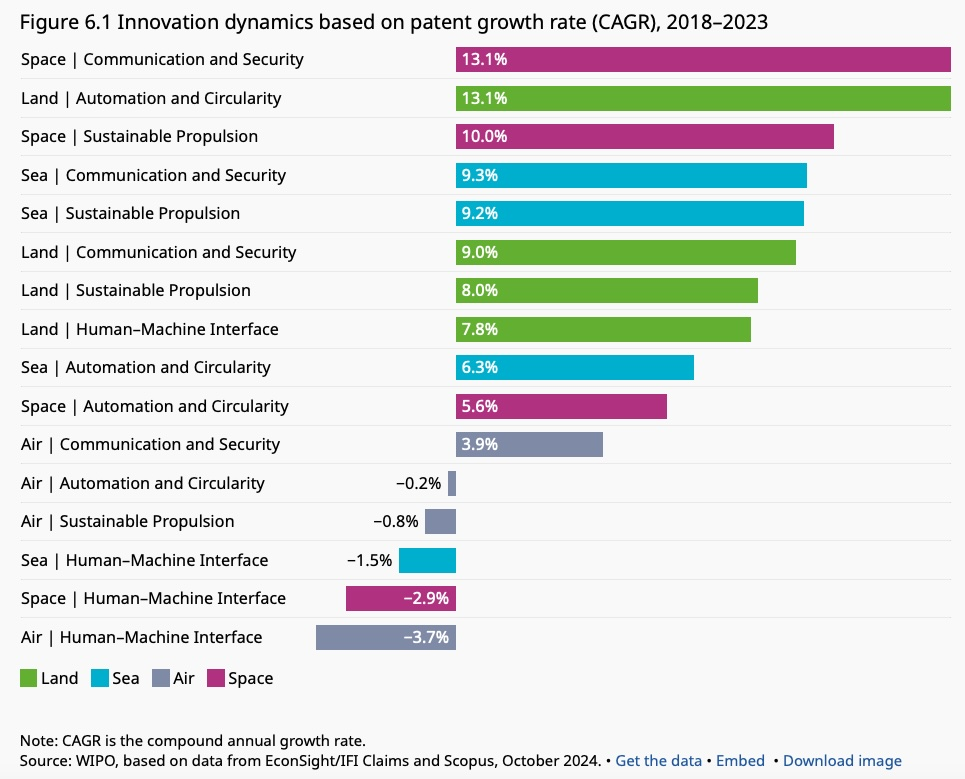
Innovation dynamics based on patent growth rate in the transportation sector between 2018 and 2023

According to the International Energy Agency (IEA), the transportation sector accounts for more than one-third of CO_{2} emissions globally. This megatrend drives the development of technologies and practices that reduce the environmental impact of transportation, such as the development, and eventually the adoption of innovative solutions, such as, for example, electric and hydrogen-powered vehicles, autonomous systems, smart mobility platforms, and energy-efficient infrastructure. Patenting activities are an indicator of technological innovation, highlighting areas where researchers and companies are investing time and resources. Patenting in the future of transportation has seen substantial growth with an increase from around 11 000 to almost 120 000 published patent families between 2000 and 2020.

Sustainable propulsion is at the forefront of reducing the environmental footprint of transportation, with research and patenting in batteries, efficient aircraft turbines (for air transport), efficient ship design (for sea transport), electric propulsion, hydrogen/fuel cells, and sustainable fuels.

Automation and circularity focus on streamlining production with more efficient processes, reduction of waste or recycling.

Communication and security technologies are meant for a safer, more connected and responsive to dynamic conditions transportation systems. It includes innovations such as lidar sensors, 5G networks, connected vehicles, smart city infrastructure, or smart port.

Sustainable propulsion and communication and security technologies represent the largest number of patent publication increase between 2000 and 2023. Sustainable propulsion is the most patented technology in land and sea transport whilst communication and security represent over 85% of the patents in space transport.

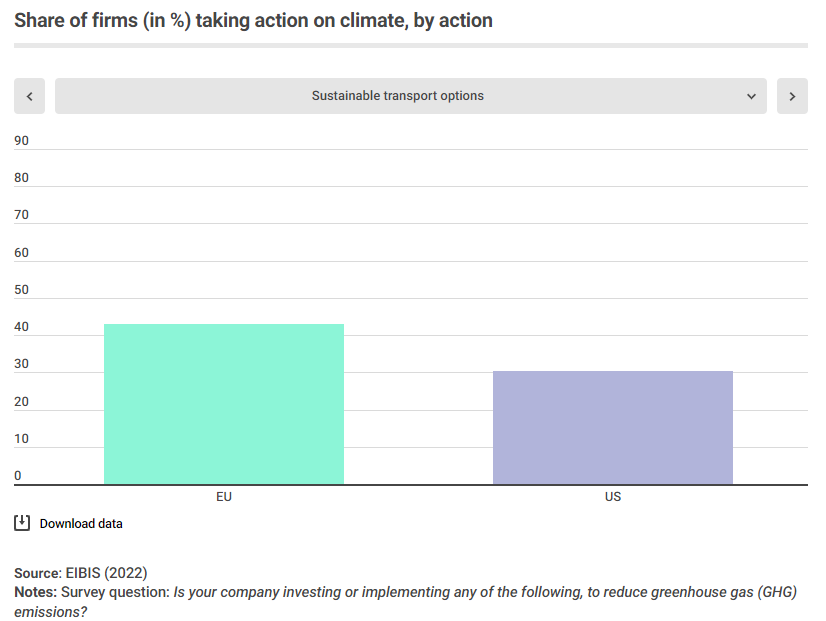
Share of firms in the EU and the US taking action on climate by including sustainable transport options.

== Tools and incentives ==
Anthropogenic per capita emissions of greenhouse gases by country by the year 2000.

Several European countries are opening up financial incentives that support more sustainable modes of transport. The European Cyclists' Federation, which focuses on daily cycling for transport, has created a document containing a non-complete overview. In the UK, employers have for many years been providing employees with financial incentives. The employee leases or borrows a bike that the employer has purchased. You can also get other support. The scheme is beneficial for the employee who saves money and gets an incentive to get exercise integrated in the daily routine. The employer can expect a tax deduction, lower sick leave and less pressure on parking spaces for cars.

Since 2010, there has been a scheme in Iceland (Samgöngugreiðslur) where those who do not drive a car to work, get paid a lump of money monthly. An employee must sign a statement not to use a car for work more often than one day a week, or 20% of the days for a period. Some employers pay fixed amounts based on trust. Other employers reimburse the expenses for repairs on bicycles, period-tickets for public transport and the like.

Since 2013, amounts up to ISK 8000 per month have been tax-free. Most major workplaces offer this, and a significant proportion of employees use the scheme. Since 2019 half the amount is tax-free if the employee signs a contract not to use a car to work for more than 40% of the days of the contract period.

=== Possible measures for urban transport ===
The EU Directorate-General for Transport and Energy (DG-TREN) has launched a program which focusses mostly on urban transport. Its main measures are:

- Clean fuels and vehicles
  - Animal-powered transport
  - Biodiesel
  - Biogas/CNG
  - Electric vehicles
  - Human-powered transport
  - Hybrid vehicles
  - Hydrogen vehicle
  - LPG
  - Sailing ships
- Sustainable (green) transport infrastructure
  - Bikeways
  - Busways
  - Greenways and foreshoreways
  - Railways
- Access restrictions
  - Access management / enforcement
  - Car restricted zones / living streets
  - Multifunctional areas
  - Parking management
  - Pedestrian zone
  - Traffic calming / speed reduction
- Integrated pricing strategies
  - Congestion pricing
  - Integrated ticketing
  - Parking management
- Collective passenger transport
  - Accessible transport systems
  - Bus rapid transit
  - Bus services
  - Demand responsive transport
  - Integrated ticketing
  - Intercity bus service
  - Intermodal transfers
  - Marketing
  - Paratransit
  - Park and ride
  - Public transport
  - Quality of service
  - Rail transport
  - Security, including transit police
- Travel information
  - Public transport route planners (intermodal journey planner)
- Less car intensive lifestyle
  - Bike sharing
    - List of bicycle-sharing systems
  - Car pooling
  - Car sharing
  - Car/driver license exit strategies
  - Cycling
- Soft measures
  - Travel blending
  - Travel plan
  - Personalised travel plan
  - Walking school bus
- Transport management
  - New urbanism and New Pedestrianism)
  - TDM Toolbox
  - Transit oriented development
  - Transportation demand management
  - Walkability
- Sustainable freight transport
  - Clean vehicles / clean fleet
  - Dry port
  - Fleet management
  - Intermodal freight transport
  - Route planning
  - Transportation management system

== History ==
Most of the tools and concepts of sustainable transport were developed before the phrase was coined. Walking, the first mode of transport, is also the most sustainable. Public transport dates back at least as far as the invention of the public bus by Blaise Pascal in 1662. The first passenger tram began operation in 1807 and the first passenger rail service in 1825. Pedal bicycles date from the 1860s. These were the only personal transport choices available to most people in Western countries prior to World War II, and remain the only options for most people in the developing world. Freight was moved by human power, animal power or rail.

=== Mass motorization ===
The post-war years brought increased wealth and a demand for much greater mobility for people and goods. The number of road vehicles in Britain increased fivefold between 1950 and 1979, with similar trends in other Western nations. Most affluent countries and cities invested heavily in bigger and better-designed roads and motorways, which were considered essential to underpin growth and prosperity. Transport planning became a branch of Urban Planning and identified induced demand as a pivotal change from "predict and provide" toward a sustainable approach incorporating land use planning and public transit. Public investment in transit, walking and cycling declined dramatically in the United States, Great Britain and Australia, although this did not occur to the same extent in Canada or mainland Europe.

Concerns about the sustainability of this approach became widespread during the 1973 oil crisis and the 1979 energy crisis. The high cost and limited availability of fuel led to a resurgence of interest in alternatives to single occupancy vehicle travel.

Transport innovations dating from this period include high-occupancy vehicle lanes, citywide carpool systems and transportation demand management. Singapore was the first country in the world to implement congestion pricing in 1975, and Curitiba began implementing its Bus Rapid Transit system in the early 1980s.

Relatively low and stable oil prices during the 1980s and 1990s led to significant increases in vehicle travel from 1980 to 2000, both directly because people chose to travel by car more often and for greater distances, and indirectly because cities developed tracts of suburban housing, distant from shops and from workplaces, now referred to as urban sprawl. Trends in freight logistics, including a movement from rail and coastal shipping to road freight and a requirement for just in time deliveries, meant that freight traffic grew faster than general vehicle traffic.

At the same time, the academic foundations of the "predict and provide" approach to transport were being questioned, notably by Peter Newman in a set of comparative studies of cities and their transport systems dating from the mid-1980s.

The British Government's White Paper on Transport marked a change in direction for transport planning in the UK. In the introduction to the White Paper, Prime Minister Tony Blair stated that

We recognise that we cannot simply build our way out of the problems we face. It would be environmentally irresponsible – and would not work.

A companion document to the White Paper called "Smarter Choices" researched the potential to scale up the small and scattered sustainable transport initiatives then occurring across Britain, and concluded that the comprehensive application of these techniques could reduce peak period car travel in urban areas by over 20%.

A similar study by the United States Federal Highway Administration, was also released in 2004 and also concluded that a more proactive approach to transportation demand was an important component of overall national transport strategy.

=== Mobility transition ===
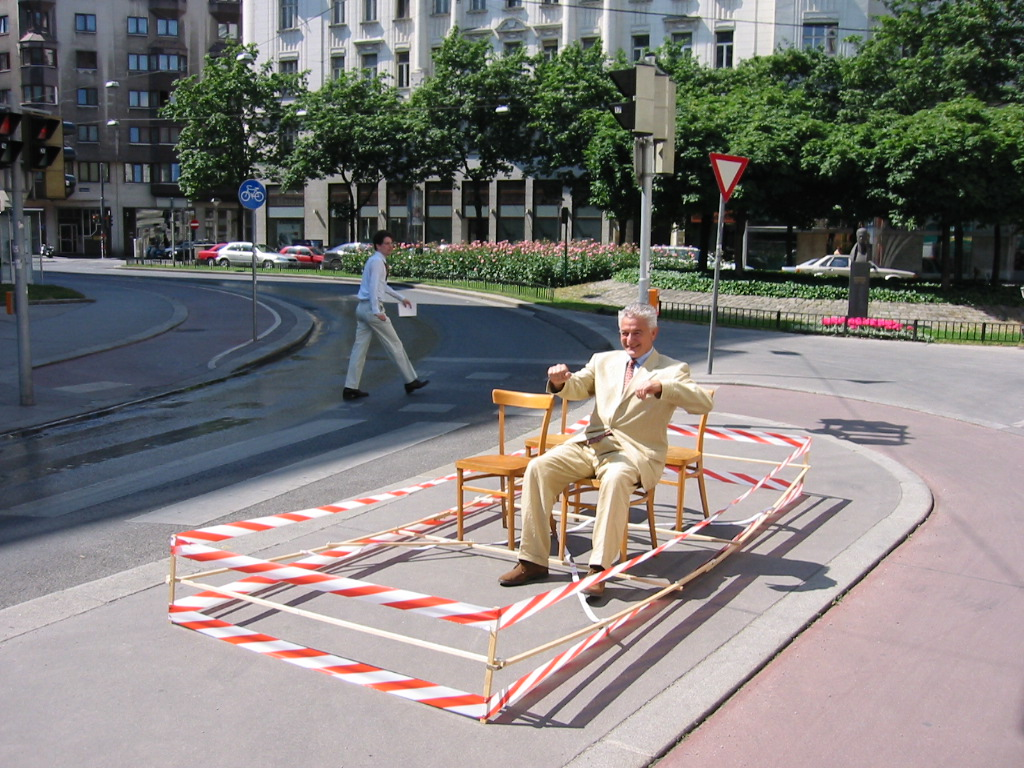
Hermann Knoflacher has been criticising auto cities and car dependency for decades. With his walkmobile, he caricatures the enormous spatial demands of motorised private transport (2007).

Mobility transition is a set of social, technological and political processes of converting traffic (including freight transport) and mobility to sustainable transport with renewable energy resources, and an integration of several different modes of private transport and local public transport. It also includes social change, a redistribution of public spaces, and different ways of financing and spending money in urban planning. The main motivation for mobility transition is the reduction of the harm and damage that traffic causes to people (mostly but not solely due to collisions) and the environment (which also often directly or indirectly affects people) in order to make (urban) society more livable, as well as solving various interconnected logistical, social, economic and energy issues and inefficiencies.

Mobility went through many transitions in the 19th and 20th centuries. Canal boats, Steam railways and bicycles largely replaced journeys afoot and by horse, and steamships replaced sailing ships. Each later changed to internal combustion engines and, in the case of many railways, electricity. They in turn were partly replaced by automobile transport and aviation.

== See also ==
- Alternatives to car use
- Circular economy
- Cyclability
- Ecological modernization
- Electric bicycle
- Energy efficiency in transport
- Environmental impact of aviation
- Environmental impact of shipping
- Free public transport
- Freeway removal
- Green building
- Green infrastructure
- Green transport hierarchy
- Hypermobility
- Localism
- Modal share
- Michael Replogle
- Road reallocation
- Solar vehicle
- Sustainable architecture
- Sustainable aviation fuel
- Sustainable biofuel
- Sustainable distribution
- Transport ecology
- Urban vitality
- Wind-powered vehicle

Groups:

- EcoMobility Alliance
- Institute for Transportation and Development Policy
- International Association of Public Transport
- Michelin Challenge Bibendum

== Bibliography ==
- Adey, Peter; Cresswell, Tim; Lee, Jane Yeonjae; Nikolaeva, Anna; Nóvoa, André; Temenos, Cristina (2021). Moving Towards Transition: Commoning Mobility for a Low-Carbon Future. London: Bloomsbury Publishing. p. 4. ISBN 978-1-78699-898-9. OCLC 1155079352.
- Newman, P.; Kenworthy, J. (1999). Sustainability and Cities: Overcoming Automobile Dependence. Washington, D.C.: Island Press. ISBN 1-55963-660-2. OCLC 39778756.
- Nagurney, Anna (2000). Sustainable Transportation Networks. Cheltenham, England: Edward Elgar Publishing. ISBN 1-84064-357-9. OCLC 42955264.
- Schiller, Preston L. Eric; Bruun, C.; Kenworthy, Jeffrey R. (2010). Introduction to Sustainable Transportation: Policy, Planning and Implementation. London, Washington, D.C.: Earthscan. ISBN 978-1-84407-665-9. OCLC 659549750.
- Enoch, Mark P. (2012). Sustainable Transport, Mobility Management and Travel Plans. Farnham, Surrey: Ashgate Press. ISBN 978-0-7546-7939-4. OCLC 828078552.
