= International Association of Public Transport =

Non-profit advocacy organisation for public transport authorities

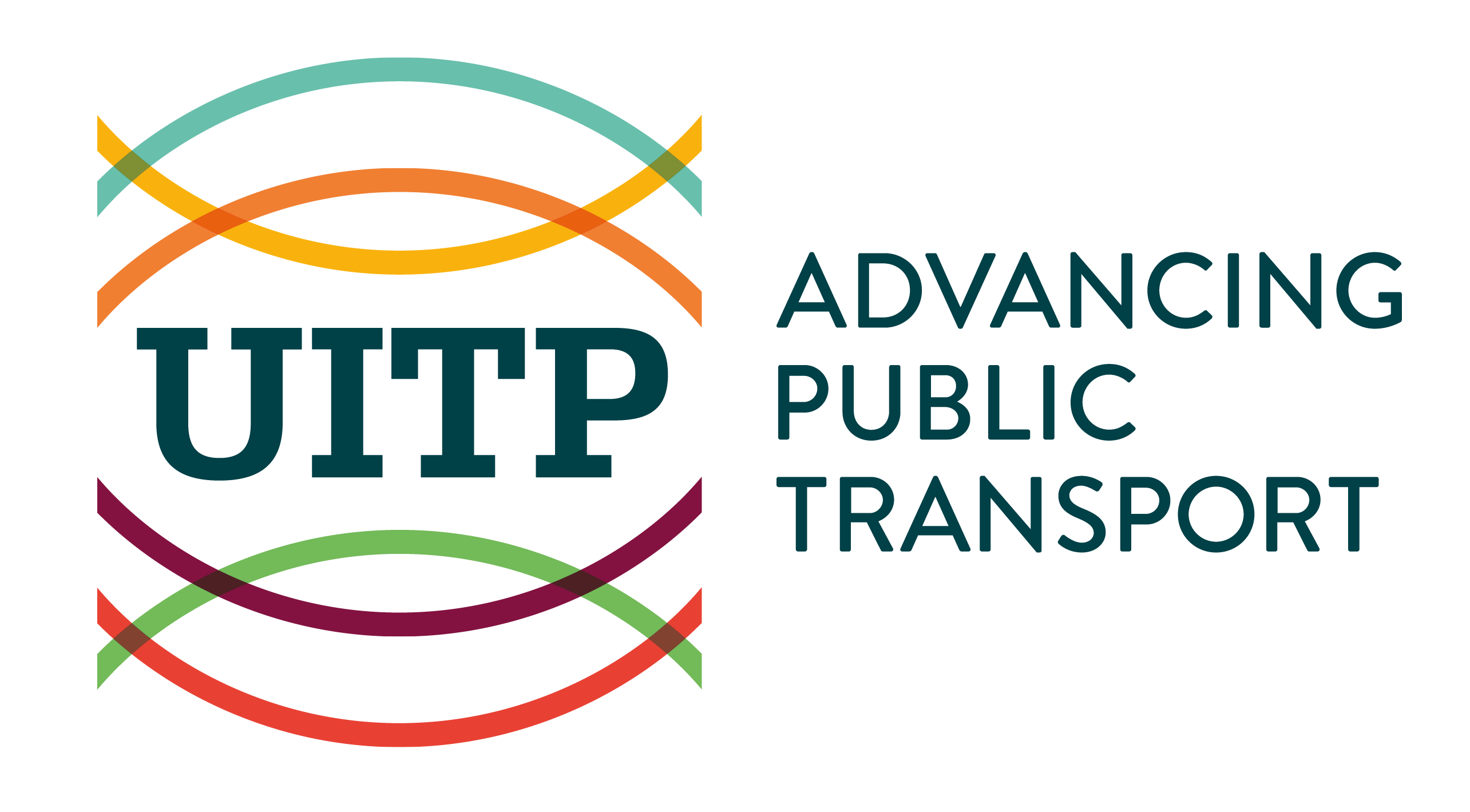
- Abbreviation: UITP
- Formation: 17 August 1885 (141 years ago)
- Type: AISBL
- Legal status: Nonprofit Organisation
- Purpose: Advocating Sustainable Transport as a member-led association
- Headquarters: Secretariat-General, Rue Sainte-Marie 6, Molenbeek-Saint-Jean, Brussels-Capital Region, 1080, Belgium, Europe
- Region served: Worldwide
- Members: 2,000+ members
- Official language: English, French, Spanish, German, Portuguese, Turkish, Chinese, Japanese, Russian, Arabic
- President: Gautier Brodeo
- Deputy President: Lilli Matson
- Secretary General: Mohamed Mezghani
- Main organ: General Assembly
- Subsidiaries: Youth For Public Transport (Y4PT) Foundation, created on 25 November 2005 (20 years ago) by the UITP Policy Board and led by Sebastián Pernet as a Co-Founder.
- Website: uitp.org

The International Association of Public Transport (French: Union Internationale des Transports Publics; UITP) is a non-profit member-led organisation for public transport authorities, networks and operators, policy decision-makers, scientific institutes and the public transport supply and service industry, that works to advance sustainable urban mobility.

== History ==
Founded on 17 August 1885, initially as the Union Internationale des Tramways (International Union of Tramways), the association is headquartered in Brussels, Belgium, with 13 offices around the world. With more than 2000 members in over 100 countries, UITP advocates for sustainable mobility and produces publications, oversees projects, hosts global events and brings together all those with a vested interested in advancing public transport.

Starting off, the association mainly focused on the development of tramway systems across Europe. However, as urban mobility increased, the scope of the association expanded multinationally. This expansion introduced the integration of buses, railways, metros, etc.

== Model ==
The International Association of Public Transport envisions a future where public transportation systems are more sustainable, accessible, and integrated with new technologies. Key strategies include increasing the use of zero-emission vehicles, promoting multimodal transportation options, and enhancing digitalization for better efficiency and passenger experience. UITP also emphasizes the importance of partnerships between the public and private sectors to meet evolving urban mobility needs and reduce carbon footprints. These plans align with global efforts to combat climate change and make cities more livable.

== Organization ==
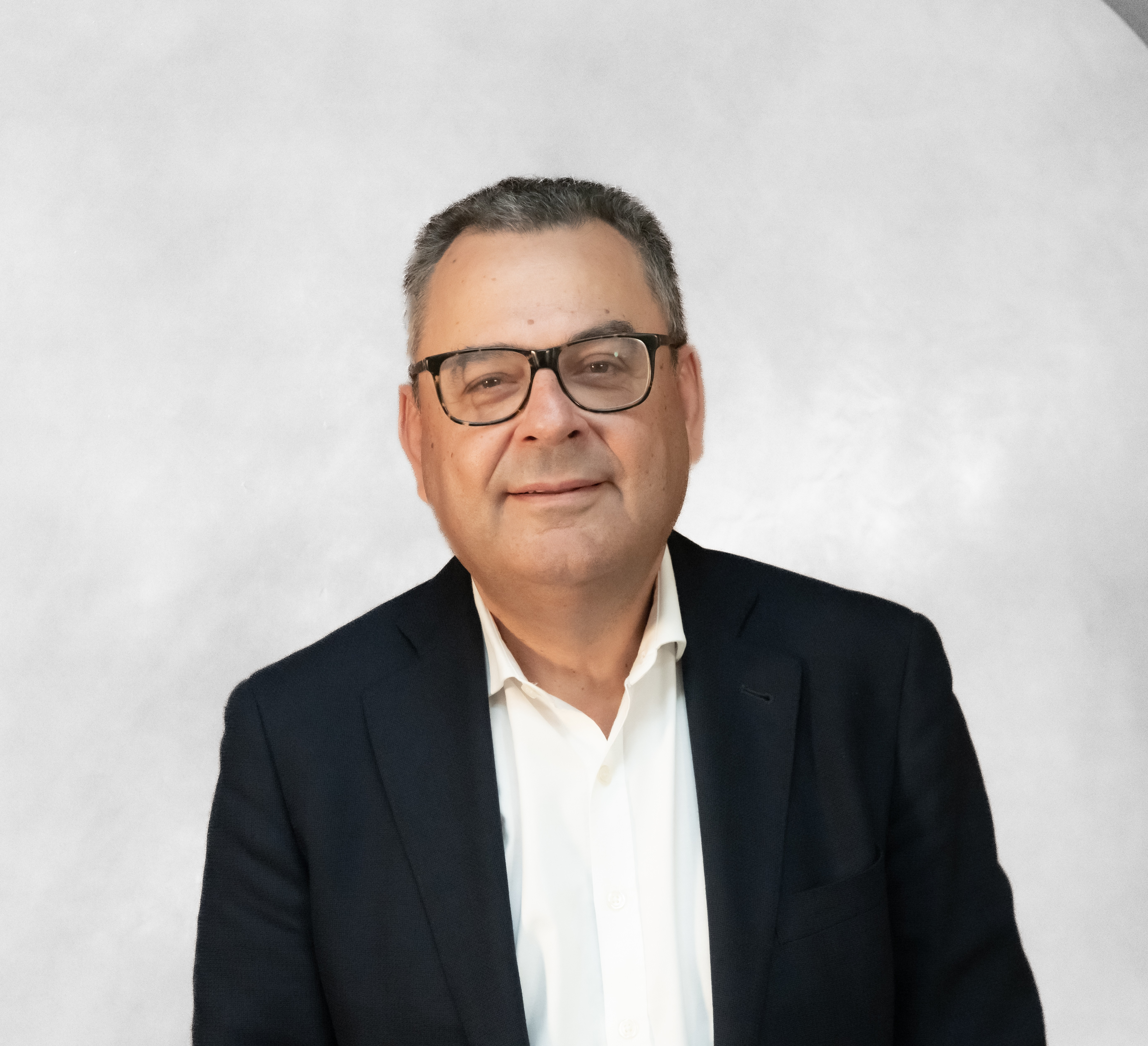
Mohamed Mezghani, Secretary General of UITP since January 2018

UITP represents an international network of more than 2,000 member companies in over 100 countries and covers all modes of public transport: metro, light rail, regional and suburban railways, bus, trolleybus, taxi and ride-hailing, and waterborne transport. It also represents collective transport in a broader sense, with active committees and working bodies on digitalisation, I.T., sustainable development, design and culture, human resources, transport economics, security, and more.

UITP is headquartered in Brussels, Belgium, with thirteen regional and liaison offices worldwide, located in Abidjan, Casablanca, Dubai, Hong Kong, Istanbul, Johannesburg, New York, São Paulo, Singapore, Mexico & Central America, New Delhi, and Auckland).

The General Secretariat is managed by Mohamed Mezghani, who has been working for more than 30 years in public transport and urban mobility-related fields and became the association's Secretary General in January 2018. He previously served in a number of internal positions, including as UITP Deputy Secretary General. His mandate was renewed for a second term, beginning in January 2023.

The President of UITP is Renée Amilcar, the General Manager of OC Transpo in Ottawa, who was voted into office in June 2023 as the association's first female President and re-elected in 2025. Joining the City of Ottawa as the General Manager in 2021, Renée oversees many projects in her daily role, including the electrification of Ottawa's transit fleet and the deployment of 350 zero-emission buses.

Being a nonprofit, funding partially comes through memberships and collaborations with companies and individuals. The association selects its members based on their role and contributions to the public transport sector. Membership is open to a wide range of stakeholders, including public transport operators, authorities, policymakers, researchers, and industry suppliers. The organization emphasizes collaboration and innovation, bringing together those who are committed to advancing sustainable urban mobility. Key members include prominent transport authorities like Transport for London (TfL) and industry leaders such as Siemens Mobility, Alstom, and Bombardier.

== Activities ==
- UITP gathers and analyses facts and figures to provide quantitative and qualitative information on key aspects of public transport and urban mobility.
- UITP manages an online information center, MyLibrary, which gives access to the full texts of UITP's studies and conference papers, as well as references to books, articles, and websites. A picture library and statistics on public transport operators are also available.
- UITP carries out studies, projects, and surveys; the results are made available in brochures and reports.
- UITP leads projects for international institutions, such as the European Commission. Under the framework of these projects, UITP launches and participates in thematic networks of mobility experts on public transport policy and organisation.
- UITP issues official positions on global mobility issues, representing the views of the sector.
- UITP tries to engage a number of international bodies, such as the United Nations (UNEP, UNDESA, UNFCCC, UNHABITAT), the World Bank, and European institutions.
- UITP organises training courses, workshops, and seminars for public transport experts.
- UITP is a member of the Group of Representative Bodies.

== See also ==
- List of metro systems
- Sustainable transport

== Bibliography ==
- Loo, B. P. Y., & Tsang, K. W. (2021). "Future directions for public transport policy" Transport Reviews, 41(3), 270–290
- Mohamed Mezghani - Agenda contributor. World Economic Forum. (n.d.). https://www.weforum.org/agenda/authors/mohamed-mezghani/
- Surveys. UITP. (2018). https://uitp.org/surveys/
- The future of public transport is safe and inclusive: UITP at TRA 2024. UITP. (2022, April 22). https://www.uitp.org/news/the-future-of-public-transport-is-safe-and-inclusive-uitp-at-tra-2024/
