= Nils Collett Vogt =

Norwegian poet

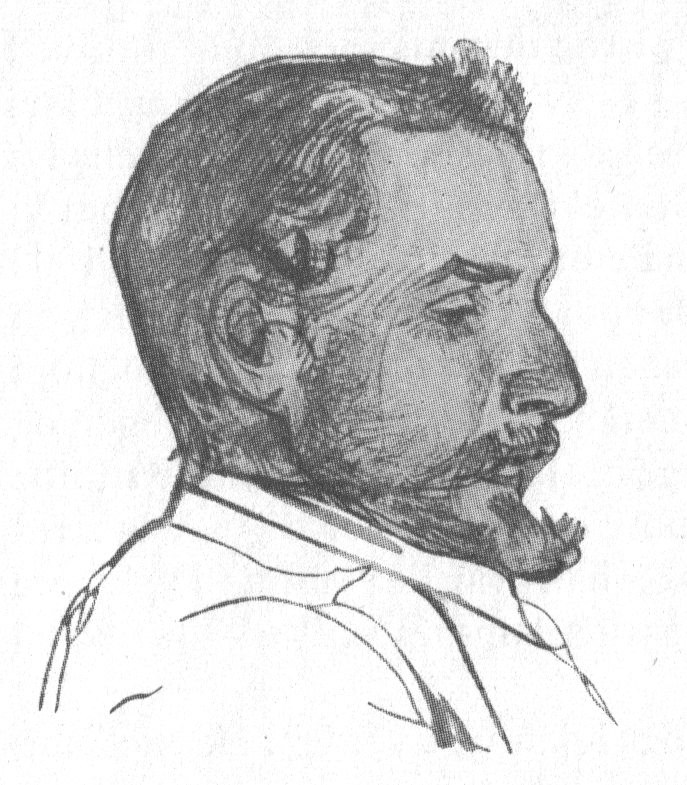
Nils Collett Vogt by Christian Krohg.

Nils Collett Vogt (24 September 1864 – 23 December 1937) was a Norwegian poet.

He was born in Christiania (now Oslo) as the son of tramway director Jens Theodor Paludan Vogt (1830–1892) and writer Johanne Collett (1833–1906). He was great-nephew of Jonas Collett and second cousin of Johan Vogt (1858–1932), Nils Vogt (1859–1927), Paul Benjamin Vogt (1863–1947) and Ragnar Vogt (1870–1943). His family first lived at St. Hanshaugen, Vestre Aker, before they in 1877 moved into a newly constructed villa in Josefines gate, Homansbyen. According to his biographer in Norsk biografisk leksikon, Hans H. Skei, he grew up in a conservative upper-class environment, but opposed "authorities and conservative attitudes". At a young age he joined the Liberal Party and penned radical articles to newspapers at the age of seventeen. After a failed matric course, his family sent him to Hamar where he took examen artium in 1884.

For a short period of time, Vogt taught at a manor house in Värmland, before he started studying law. He discarded the law studies in favor of poetry writing for the periodical Nyt Tidsskrift. Vogt thereupon travelled to Copenhagen, where he met Christian Krogh and made his debut with the poetry collection Digte (lit. "Poems"). He published the novel Familiens sorg in 1889, which was based on his own childhood and conflicts with his father. He had planned to write a resume of the novel, but he soon realised that the intellectual conditions in the 1890s were better for poetry than for fiction.

Following his father's 1892 death, Vogt travelled to the Italian island Capri. In 1894, he published the poetry collection Fra Vaar til Høst ("From Spring to Autumn"), which according to Skei represented his "final breakthrough". In the same year, he married Siri Maria Thyselius (1854–1936), with whom he lived at her homeplace. In the following decades, Vogt wrote many poems and plays, and also a few novels. His autobiography Fra gutt til mann ("From Boy to Man") was published in 1932, and is amongst his best known works. His wife died in 1936, and he moved to Lillehammer, where he died on 23 December 1937.

== See also ==
- Nils Collett Vogt bibliography
