= Travel blending =

Travel blending is a technique, developed in Australia, for encouraging people to make more efficient and environmentally sound transportation choices. The technique involves governments encouraging citizens to undertake a greater number of tasks on one trip, rather than making several trips to multiple locations at different times, thus improving travel efficiency and decreasing the strain on transportation networks.

The technique originated in Sydney, as an effort to reduce air pollution before the 2000 Summer Olympics.
