= Volrath Vogt =

Norwegian writer (1817–1889)

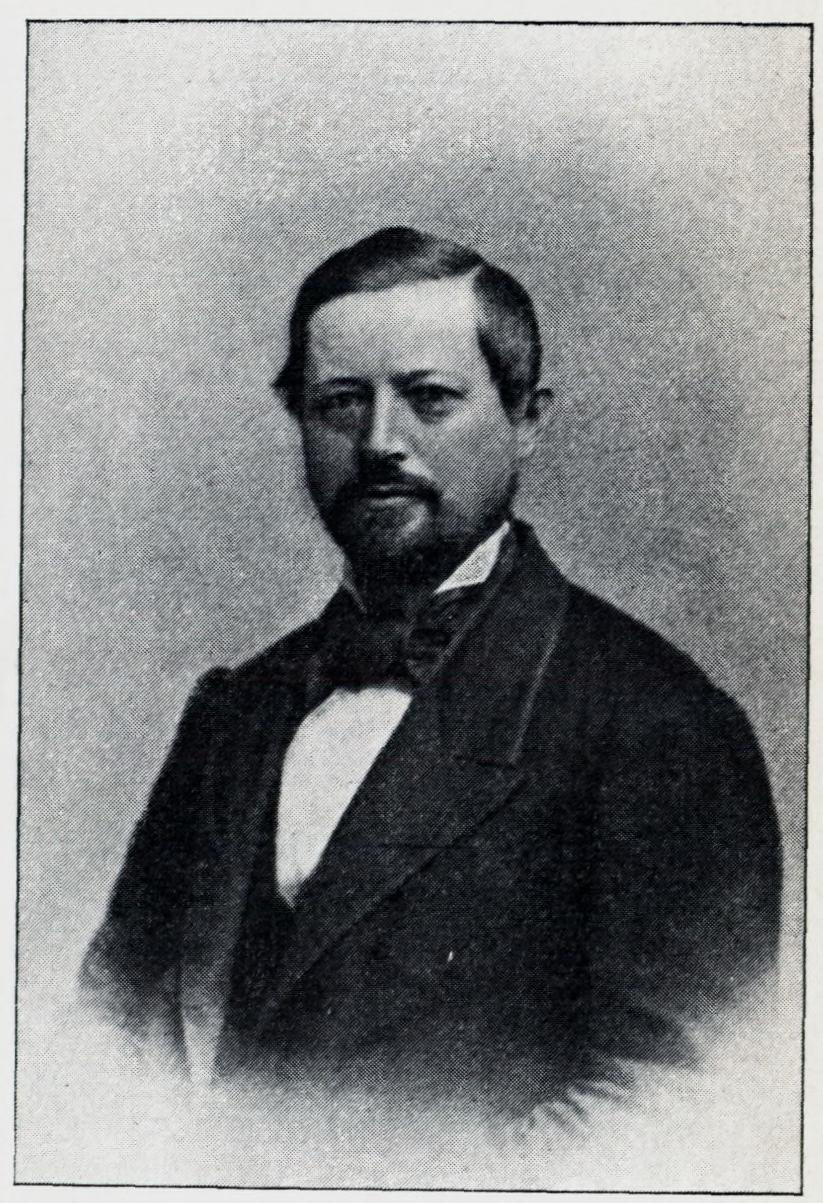
Volrath Vogt

Volrath Vogt (14 February 1817 – 19 July 1889) was a Danish-born, Norwegian theologian, educator and author. Today he is most known for his biblical stories for schoolchildren.

Vogt was born in the village of Reerslev near Roskilde, Denmark. He was the son of Johan Nilsen Vogt (1783–1859) and Henriette Elisabeth Lorenzina Juhl (1790–1846). He grew up at Tune in Christiania (modern Oslo), Norway, where his father was a Church of Norway vicar and later provost. He earned his cand.theol. in 1838.

He was a teacher at the Christiania Cathedral School for fifty years (1839 to 1889). Vogt taught in religion, geography and the French language. In 1863 he conducted an extended research trip to Syria and Palestine, where he gathered impressions and historical data. He published a number of popular works of the Gospels, a textbook in Church history and various textbooks on Bible history. His textbook Bibelhistorie med Lidt af Kirkens Historie from 1858 became widely used in schools, and had been printed in more than a million copies at the time of his death.

== Selected works ==
- Udtog af Kirkehistorien nærmest til Brug ved de lærde Skoler – 1843
- Forklaring af Matthæi Evangelium til Skolebrug – 1849
- Forklaring af Johannes's Evangelium til Skolebrug – 1856
- Bibelhistorie med Lidt af Kirkens Historie – 1858
- Bibelhistorie med Beskrivelse af det Hellige Land for Borger- og høiere Almueskoler – 1862
- Forklaring af Luthers lille Katekismus, efter Pontoppidan- 1865
- Kirkehistorie til Skolebrug – 1865
- Reise i det Hellige Land og Syrien, tilleggshefte til Folkevennen – 1865
- Det Hellige Land – 1868
- Mattæus' Evangelium i ændret Oversættelse med Anmærkninger – 1884
- Stykker af 12 Kapitler af første Mosebog, i ændret Oversættelse med Anmærkninger – 1886
