= Autopass Card =

Singaporean smart card

The Autopass Card is a mandatory stored-value smart card that allows the payment of Vehicles Entry Permit (VEP) fees, toll charges and Electronic Road Pricing (ERP) fees for foreign vehicles in Singapore. The card is sold only to foreign motorists. As vehicle information is encoded in the card, it is not transferable between vehicles. It can also act as a NETS CashCard (chip version) or NETS FlashPay card (contactless version) for all NETS retail transactions and paying carparks that uses the Electronic Parking System (EPS).

== Overview ==
Autopass Cards slotted in In-vehicle units (IU) installed in the vehicle are automatically deducted when the vehicle passes through an ERP gantry. If one does not have an IU, they can take a daily pass to enter the ERP areas such as the Central Area.

Autopass Cards are no longer sold at the primary clearance/immigration booths or VEP/Tolls office at the Tuas and Woodlands checkpoints in Singapore. Motorists must apply through online on the OneMotoring website with valid road tax discs and insurance certificates for their cars when doing their application for the Autopass Card.

== See also ==
- Johor–Singapore Causeway
