= Simulation of Urban MObility =

Free software for transport simulation

Simulation of Urban MObility (SUMO)

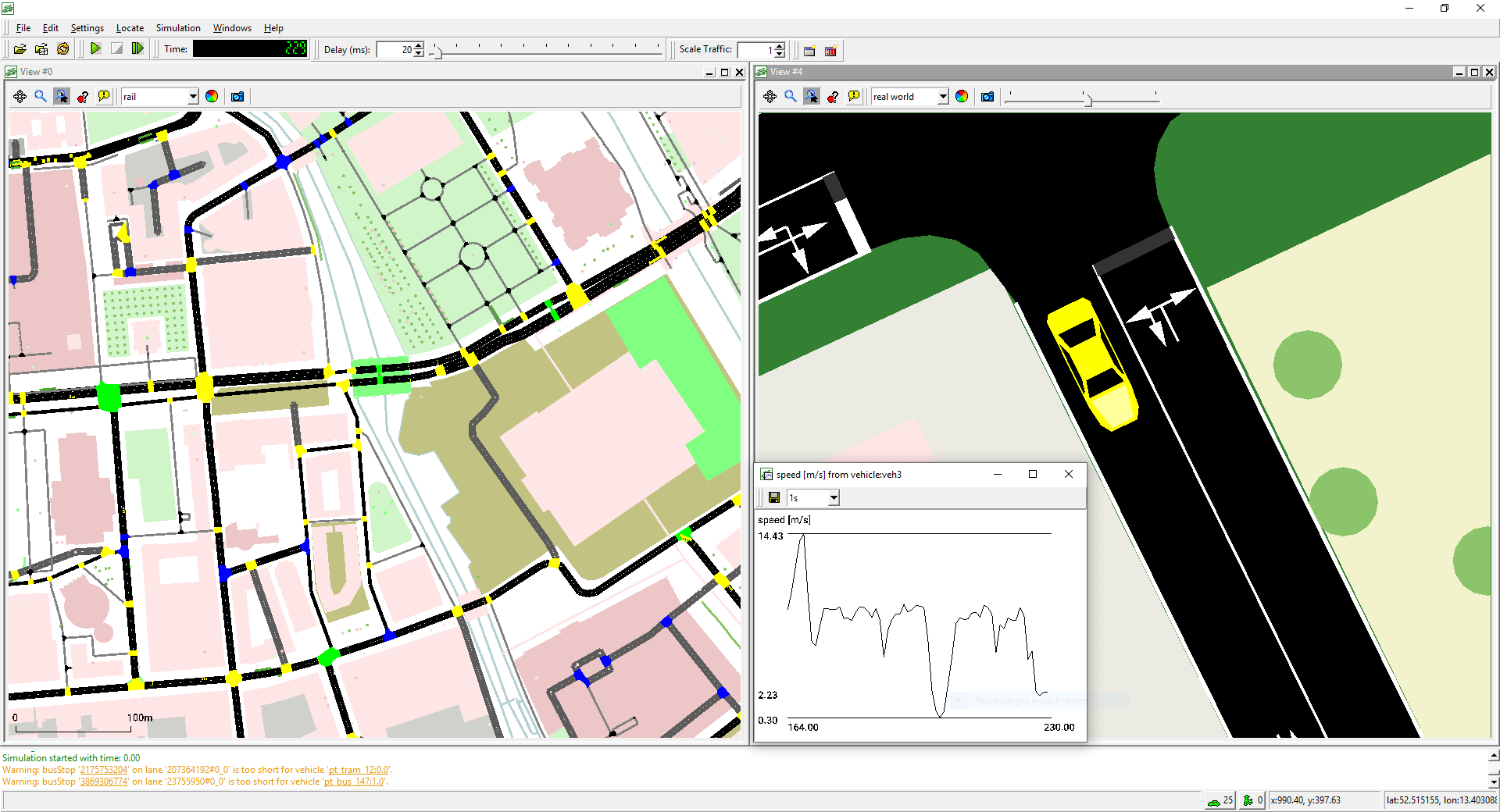
- Developer: German Aerospace Center
- Release: 2001; 25 years ago
- Stable release: 1.27.1 / 25 June 2026; 2 months ago
- Written in: C++, Java, Python
- License: Eclipse Public License
- Website: eclipse.dev/sumo
- Repository: github.com/eclipse-sumo/sumo

Simulation of Urban MObility (Eclipse SUMO or simply SUMO) is an open source, portable, microscopic and continuous multi-modal traffic simulation package designed to handle large networks. SUMO is developed by the German Aerospace Center and community users. It has been freely available as open-source since 2001, and since 2017 it is an Eclipse Foundation project.

== Purpose ==
Traffic simulation within SUMO uses software tools for simulation and analysis of road traffic and traffic management systems. New traffic strategies can be implemented via a simulation for analysis before they are used in real-world situations. SUMO has also been proposed as a toolchain component for the development and validation of automated driving functions via various X-in-the-Loop and digital twin approaches.

SUMO is used for research purposes like traffic forecasting, evaluation of traffic lights, route selection, or in the field of vehicular communication systems. SUMO users are able to make changes to the program source code through the open-source license to experiment with new approaches.

== Projects ==
SUMO was used in the following national and international projects:

- AMITRAN, a CO_{2} assessment methodology achieved by ICT applied to the transport sector via intelligent transportation systems (ITS).
- COLOMBO
- CityMobil, a project for integration of automated transport systems in the urban environment. Completed in 2011.
- DRIVE C2X
- iTETRIS
- Soccer traffic data collection from the air during the 2006 FIFA World Cup football championship
- VABENE project to improve safety at mass events.

== See also ==
- Intelligent transportation system
- Traffic optimization
- Traffic estimation and prediction system

== Notes ==
- Alvarez Lopez, Pablo; Behrisch, Michael; Bieker-Walz, Laura; Erdmann, Jakob; Flötteröd, Yun-Pang; Hilbrich, Robert; Lücken, Leonhard; Rummel, Johannes; Wagner, Peter; Wießner, Evamarie (2018), "Microscopic Traffic Simulation using SUMO", IEEE Intelligent Transportation Systems Conference (ITSC), pp. 2575–2582, doi:10.1109/ITSC.2018.8569938, ISBN 978-1-7281-0321-1
- Krajzewicz, Daniel; Erdmann, Jakob; Behrisch, Michael; Bieker, Laura (December 2012), "Recent Development and Applications of SUMO - Simulation of Urban MObility" (PDF), International Journal On Advances in Systems and Measurements, vol. 5, no. 3&4, pp. 128–138, archived from the original (PDF) on 2013-09-18
