= Traffic estimation and prediction system =

Traffic estimation and prediction systems (TrEPS) have the potential to improve traffic conditions and reduce travel delays by facilitating better utilization of available capacity. These systems exploit currently available and emerging computer, communication, and control technologies to monitor, manage, and control the transportation system. They also provide various levels of traffic information and trip advisory to system users, including many ITS service providers, so that travelers can make timely and informed travel decisions.

== Need for TrEPS ==
The success of ITS technology deployments is heavily dependent on the availability of timely and accurate estimates of prevailing and emerging traffic conditions. As such, there is a strong need for a “traffic prediction system”. The needed system is to utilize advanced traffic models to analyze data, especially real-time traffic data, from different sources to estimate and predict traffic conditions so that proactive Advanced Traffic Management Systems (ATMS) and Advanced Traveler Information Systems (ATIS) strategies can be implemented to meet various traffic control, management, and operation objectives.

== Research ==
=== United States ===
In United States, the FHWA R&D initiated a Dynamic Traffic Assignment (DTA) research project in 1994 to meet the need for a traffic prediction system and to help address complex traffic control and management issues in the dynamic ITS environment. The main objective of this research is to develop a deployable real-time Traffic Estimation and Prediction System (TrEPS) to meet the information need in the ITS context. In October 1995, two parallel research contracts were awarded to Massachusetts Institute of Technology (MIT) and the University of Texas at Austin (UTX) with a follow-up development and support at the University of Maryland (UMD), respectively. Each team was required to develop a prototype of TrEPS demonstrating its potential for real time application capability. After three years of intensive R&D efforts, two prototype TrEPS were developed. The two prototype TrEPS developed by MIT and UTX/UMD are named DynaMIT-R and DYNASMART-X, respectively. Both systems are simulation-based DTA system.

=== France ===
In France, the Centre national d’information routière (National Centre for Traffic Information/CNIR) directs, coordinates and monitors the work of seven regional traffic coordination and information centres (CRICRs). It publishes forecasts which are available on line at www.bison-fute.equipement.gouv.fr/en/ and are widely referred to in radio and television broadcasts. The advice of "Bison Futé" as the service is called is well known and has been in place for several decades.

=== China ===
In China, Xi'an Jiaotong University (XJTU) initiated a similar simulation-based DTA research project in 2000 with a follow-up development and support at the Shandong Academy of Sciences after 2004. Dr. Yong Lin is the project leader and Houbing Song is the earliest project member. After six years of intense R&D efforts, one prototype TrEPS was developed in 2006. The overall prototype TrEPS developed by Dr. Lin and his team which has more than 20 members is named DynaCHINA (Dynamic Consistent Hybrid Information based on Network Assignment).

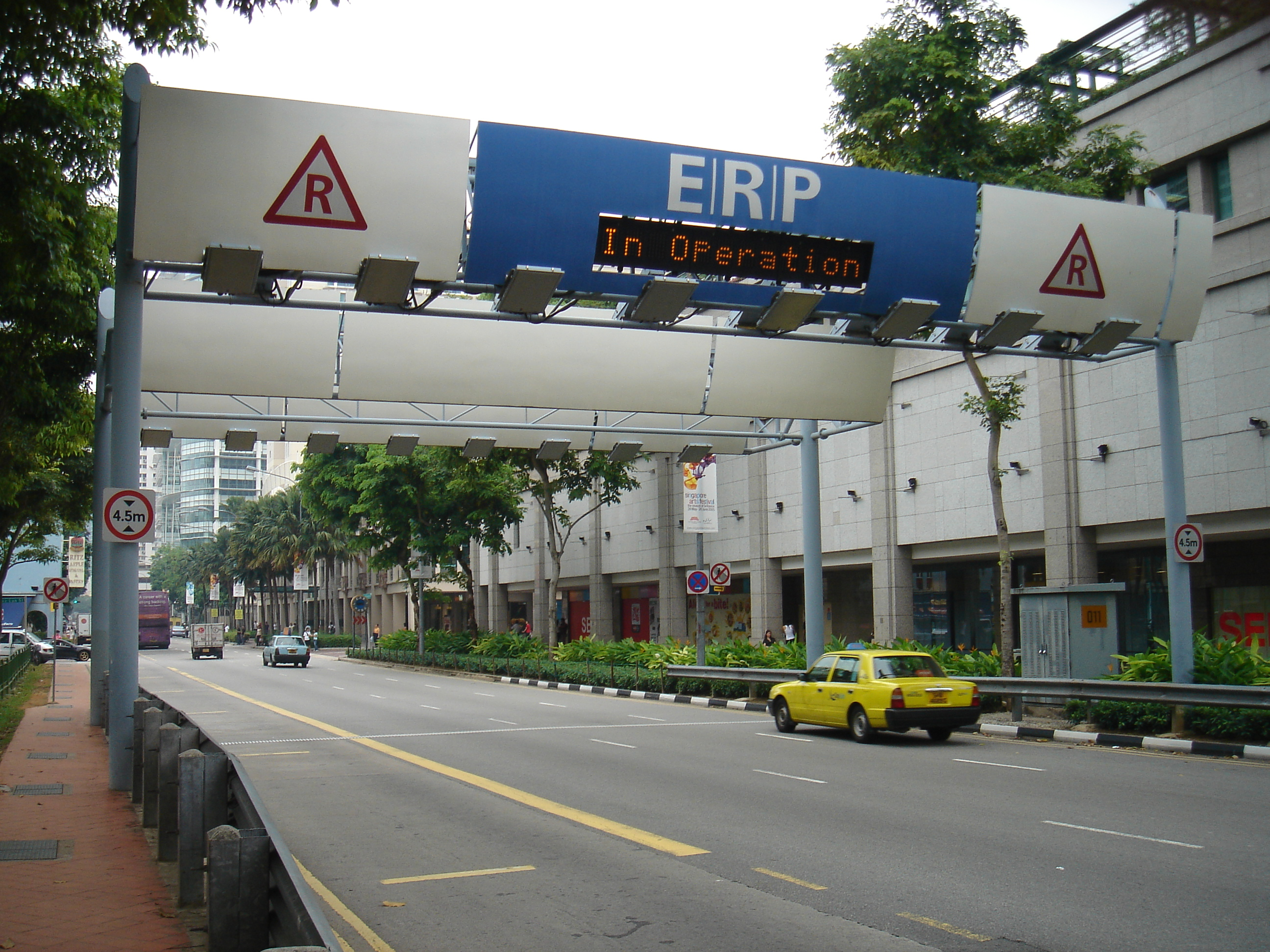
Electronic Road Pricing Gantry at North Bridge Road, Singapore

=== Singapore ===
Singapore implemented the first practical application of congestion pricing in the world in 1975, the Singapore's Area Licensing Scheme. Thanks to technological advances in electronic toll collection, detection, and video surveillance, Singapore upgraded its system in 1998. (see Singapore's Electronic Road Pricing)

In an effort to improve the pricing mechanism and to introduce real-time variable pricing, Singapore’s Land Transport Authority, together with IBM, ran a pilot from December 2006 to April 2007, with a traffic estimation and prediction tool, which uses historical traffic data and real-time feeds with flow conditions from several sources, in order to predict the levels of congestion up to an hour in advance. By accurate estimating prevailing and emerging traffic conditions, this technology is expected to allow variable pricing, together with improved overall traffic management, including the provision of information in advanced to alert drivers about conditions ahead, and the prices being charged at that moment. The pilot results show overall prediction results above 85 percent of accuracy. Furthermore, when more data was available, at peak hours, average accuracy raised near or above 90 percent.
