= Ecopass =

Traffic pollution charge implemented in Milan

The Ecopass program was a traffic pollution charge implemented in Milan, Italy, as an urban toll for some motorists traveling within a designated traffic restricted zone or ZTL (Italian: Zone a Traffico Limitato), corresponding to the central Cerchia dei Bastioni area and encircling around 8.2 km^{2} (3.2 sq mi). The Ecopass was implemented as a one-year trial program on 2 January 2008, and later extended until 31 December 2009. A public consultation was planned to be conducted early in 2009 to decide if the charge becomes permanent. Subsequently, the charge-scheme was prolonged until 31 December 2011. Starting from 16 January 2012, a new scheme (called Milan Area C) was introduced, converting it from a pollution-charge to a conventional congestion charge.

The primary purpose of the program was to reduce traffic and air pollution, as it was based on a fee structure according to the vehicle's engine emission standards, and to use the funds raised through the charge to finance public transportation projects, cycle paths, and green vehicles. This program was similar to the congestion pricing programs implemented in London and Stockholm, although there was a variation of these pricing schemes, as only vehicles with high-polluting engines entering the ZTL were charged, and the ones with older most polluting engines were banned.

== Background ==
Milan has one of the highest European rates of car ownership, as more than half of Milan citizens use private cars and motorcycles, ranking second only after Rome, and among the highest in the world. The city also has the third-highest concentration of airborne particulate matter among large European cities, both in terms of average annual level and days of exceeding the European Union PM10 limit of 50 micrograms per cubic meter, according to a 2007 study supported by several environmental groups. Due to its lingering air pollution problems and associated health problems, in 2007, and for a trial period, the city banned 170,000 older cars and motorcycles that do not pass strict environmental emission standards.

In January 2008 the mayor of Milan, Letizia Moratti and her deputy for mobility and environment Edoardo Croci, launched the Ecopass program expecting a 30% cut in pollution levels and a 10% reduction in traffic. She said that it was part of a wider project to reduce smog in the Lombardy region and increase the use of public transportation. The mayor forecast that the scheme would raise €24 million a year, two thirds of which would be invested into public transportation. Because of opposition, even among her own political allies, the original plan had to be scaled down as the traffic restricted zone (ZTL) was reduced from a planned 60 km^{2} to 8 km^{2}. The implemented Ecopass ZTL represents just 5% of the city's area. Also the launch was delayed from October 2007 until after the Christmas and New Year holidays, and the mayor was forced to include discounts for local residents.

== Description ==
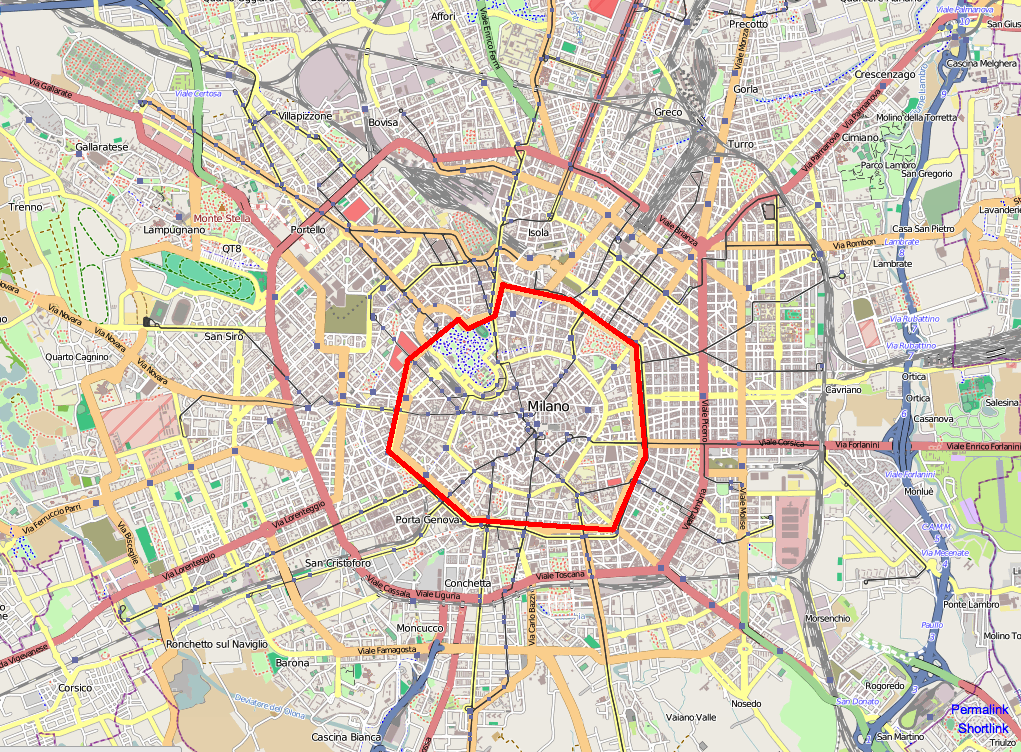
Ecopass traffic restricted zone (ZTL)

The amount of the charge depended on the vehicle's engine emissions standard and fees vary from €2–10 on weekdays from 7:30 a.m. to 7:30 p.m. Free access to the ZTL was granted to several types of alternative fuel vehicles and for conventional fuel vehicles compliant with the Euro3 and Euro4 or better. Residents within the restricted zone were exempted only if driving higher emission standard vehicles while owners of vehicles with older more polluting engines a discount only if they buy an annual pass that can go up to €250 depending on the vehicle's engine emission standards. Enforcement is carried out through digital cameras located at 43 electronic gates, with fines for offenders varying between €70–275. The Ecopass fee can be paid before entering the ZTL or up to midnight the next day after entering. There are daily and multiple-day passes. Payment of the fee can be made via internet, by telephone, in designated banks or by direct debit to the user's bank account, by first an Ecopass card must be issue at designated places.

There were also restrictions on entering the ZTL between 7:30 a.m. to 9:00 p.m. for trucks with a length greater than 7 m; commercial loading and unloading operations are restricted to pre-established schedules; and the vehicles with older more polluting engines were forbidden to enter the ZTL during six months a year.

Milanese authorities decided to temporarily suspend charging the Ecopass fees during a three-week period in August 2008 in order to facilitate tourism inside the restricted area (ZTL), considering that during this time of the summer local traffic drops by around 30% and pollution levels are usually at a minimum level.

== Early results ==
=== Traffic and transit ===
An estimated 98,000 vehicles were entering the restricted area before the Ecopass came into force. According to an evaluation conducted by the Milanese Agency of Mobility and the Environment in December 2008, during the first month traffic inside the ZTL fell to 82,200 vehicles, and for the first eleven months the average traffic flow was 87,700 vehicles. This represents 12.3% fewer vehicles entering the ZTL, while outside of the Ecopass area traffic decreased by 3.6%. Meanwhile, surface public transportation service grew by 1,300 additional daily runs, carrying an average of 19,100 additional daily passengers, an increment of 7.3% for this eleven-month period. For the morning rush hour during the same months the number of congested kilometers in the interior traffic network fell by 25.1% and average travel speed improved 4.0%, translating into Euro 9.3 million saved by year. Traffic accidents inside the ZTL also fell by 20.6%.

=== Air pollution ===
A comparison of the type of vehicles entering the ZTL by engine standard with respect to the months of October and November 2007 found that there has been a change in the composition of the fleet entering the restricted area, with a sharp reduction of older vehicles with lower emission standard engines. The number of vehicles subject to the charge fell by 56.4%, representing an average reduction of 21,274 vehicles per day, with a greater variation among auto drivers when compared to commercial vehicles. The number of exempt vehicles grew by 4.3%, for an average increase of 2.248 vehicles a day.

The Milanese Agency of Mobility and the Environment report shows that during the first eleven months of the Ecopass program the number of days exceeding the permitted level of particulate matter of 50 μg/m^{3} fell to 83 days, in contrast to the period January to November 2002 to 2007, when the average number of days exceeding this limit was 125 days. This study also found that between January and November (excluding August when the charge was temporarily suspended), all traffic related emissions were lower. PM10 decreased by 23%, particulate matter decreased by 18%, NH_{3} fell 47%, NO_{x} was reduced by 15%, and CO_{2} emission were cut by 14%.

The city of Milan was awarded a 2009 Sustainable Transport Honorable Mention by the Institute for Transportation and Development Policy (ITDP) for the introduction and success of its Ecopass program.

== Restrictions and fees by type of vehicle ==
Any motor vehicle built before the Euro emission standards were in force (called pre-E) is not allowed to enter the restricted zone (ZTL) from October 15 to April 15, as these vehicles have the worst polluting engines and the weather during this period worsens air quality. This is a restriction in force in the entire Lombardy region since 2007. Cleaner vehicles are exempted from the pollution charge and there is free access for all vehicles on Saturdays and Sundays, except as noted above. The amount of the charge payable depends on the type of vehicle according with their compliance with the European emission standards, and there is a discounted annual pass for residents within the restricted zone (ZTL). The following table details the daily and annual charges and the type of vehicles that are exempted.

Ecopass charges according to engine emission class by type of vehicle
Light vehicles up to 9 passengers		Commercial vehicles (transport of goods)		Autobuses and vans carrying more than 9 passengers		ZTL residents		
Engine class	Daily charge	Engine class	Daily charge	Engine class	Daily charge	Engine class	Daily charge	Annual pass
Class I - Clean fuel vehicles
LPG and CNG vehicle - Free access
Hybrid vehicle - Free access
Electric vehicle - Free access
Class II - Conventional fuel engines with cleaner emissions
Gasoline E IV or better - Free access
Gasoline E III - Free access
Diesel with PM filter - Free access
Diesel E V with PM filter	Free	-		-		Diesel E V with PM filter	Free	Free
Class III - Less clean gasoline engines
Gasoline E II	€2.00	Gasoline E II	€2.00	Gasoline E II	€2.00	Gasoline E II	€2.00	€50.00
Gasoline E I	€2.00	Gasoline E I	€2.00	Gasoline E I	€2.00	Gasoline E I	€2.00	€50.00
Class IV - Older gasoline engines & less clean diesel engines
Gasoline pre-E	€5.00	Gasoline pre-E	€5.00	Gasoline pre-E	€5.00	Gasoline pre-E	€5.00	€125
Diesel E IV	€5.00	Diesel E V	€5.00	Diesel E IV	€5.00	Diesel E IV	€5.00	€125
Diesel E III	€5.00	Diesel E IV	€5.00	-		Diesel E III	€5.00	€125
Diesel E II	€5.00	Diesel E III	€5.00	-		Diesel E II	€5.00	€125
Diesel E I	€5.00	-		-		Diesel E I	€5.00	€125
Class V - Older diesel engines
Diesel pre-E	€10.00	Diesel pre-E	€10.00	Diesel pre-E	€10.00	Diesel pre-E	€10.00	€250
-		Diesel E I	€10.00	Diesel E I	€10.00	-		
-		Diesel E II	€10.00	Diesel E II	€10.00	-		
-		-		Diesel E III	€10.00	-		
Note: The letter "E" above is short for "Euro" and refers to the European emission standards. Euro V standards went into effect in October 2008.

== Controversy and criticism ==
The process leading to the approval and implementation of the Ecopass began in 2006 and it was a controversial process with open conflict, involving intense public debate, political rhetoric and statements by public authorities at the local and regional level. With such a wide public discussion the degree of concern among the Milan citizens over environmental pollution is evident. One survey made by a leading newspaper stated that 76% of Milan residents thought that the quality of environment has worsened, but 43% declared that traffic is the primary problem not pollution. The Milan Mayor, Letizia Moratti, launched the Ecopass program even with opposition among her own political allies, and the original plan had to be scaled down to a smaller area, and the traffic restricted zone (ZTL) project was reduced significantly. During these discussions some critics argued that "the pollution charge should not just be an extra tax", others were upset that wider action was not taken. They argued that "car exhaust is an important source of particulate matter but it's not the only one."

This controversial tone lessened after the initial results reported a successful first month after Ecopass implementation. However, some doctors have complained that even as pollution level has been reduced, the improvement in air quality had been insufficient, and they are advocating for the pollution charge to be raised and the ZTL to be extended outwards.

During the first months of operation quality of service complaints increased. These mainly regarded the lack of reliability of the payment system. A frequent complaint was over the Ecopass website. The dedicated link for toll payments has broken down on several occasions and users have threatened legal action. Another complaint relates to the long queue of appeals waiting to be resolved by the courts, as all cases are scheduled to start no earlier than March 2009.

Before the Ecopass came into force there were around 98 thousand vehicles entering the restricted zone every day, but now traffic in the ZTL is approaching 87,000 daily vehicles (91,7 thousand in November 2008) and it seems traffic jams are slowly coming back to the pre-Ecopass levels. In the same regard, another criticism is the slow erosion of the system benefits, as the Ecopass price structure has been an incentive for car owners to buy new vehicles, and now more than 7,000 vehicles per day have free access. Despite the fact that these vehicles having less polluting engines, the free access helps less with the congestion problem. This trend is contributing to a return to previous traffic levels and at the same time reducing revenue collected. This threatens the ability to keep the system in operation. Also it was criticized the decision to maintain the exemption for Euro IV diesel vehicles when authorities decided to extend the Ecopass until December 2009, because this decision is also contributing to the fading of the initial benefits.

== New system ==
A new congestion charge was introduced on 16 January 2012, replacing the Ecopass system. The new system, Area C, is based on the same Ecopass area, but every vehicle need to pay €5 regardless of their pollution level. Residents inside the area have 40 free access per year and a discounted fare of €2.

== See also ==
- Milan Area C
- Carbon tax
- Congestion pricing
- Ecotax
- London congestion charge
- Low-emission zone
- Pareto efficiency
- Pigovian tax
- Polluter pays principle
- Road space rationing
- San Francisco congestion pricing
- Singapore's Electronic Road Pricing
- Stockholm congestion tax
- Tragedy of the Commons
- Transport economics
