= Transport economics =

Branch of economics

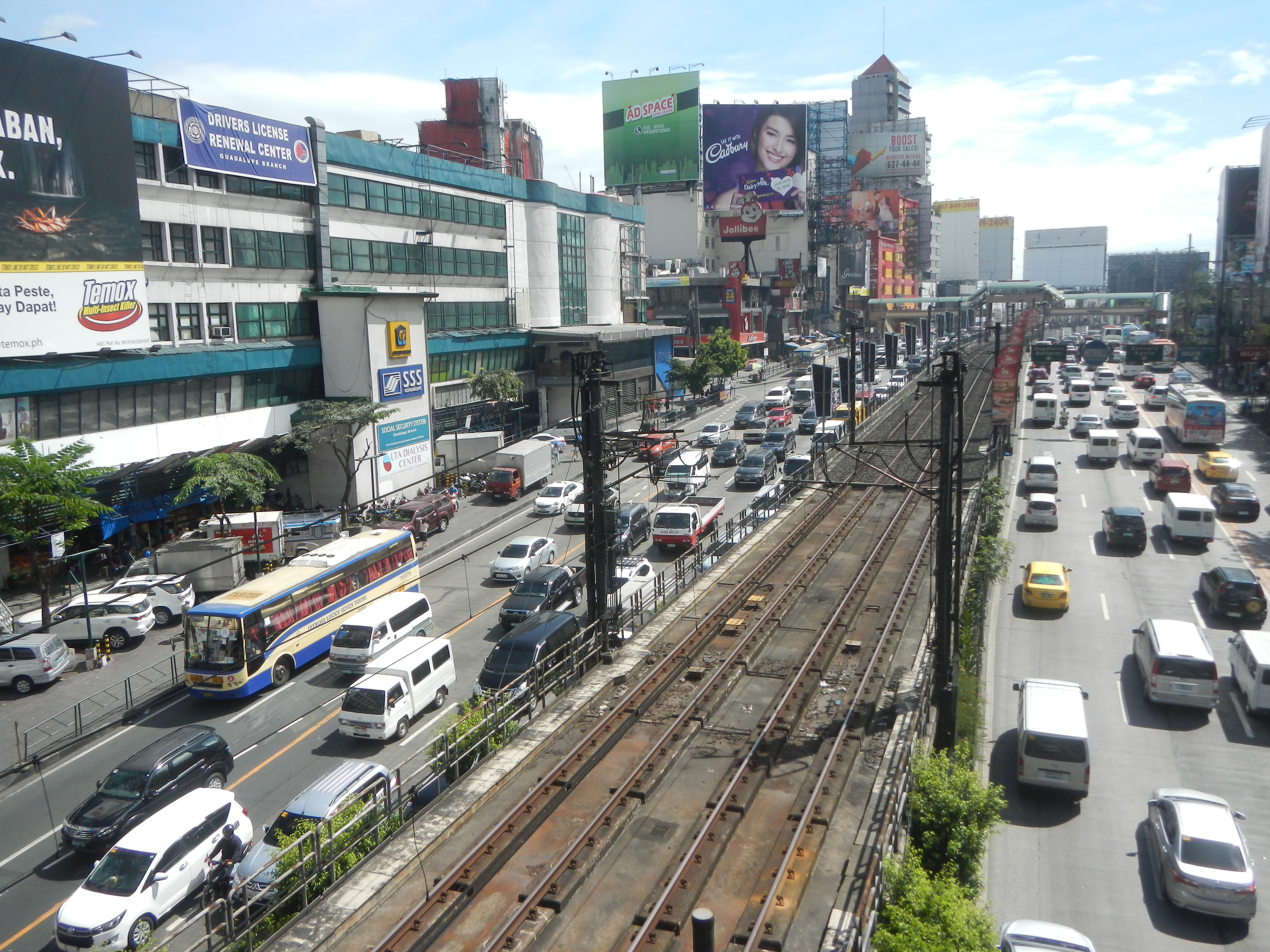
This picture illustrates a variety of transportation systems: public transportation; private vehicle road use; and rail

Transport economics is a branch of economics founded in 1959 by American economist John R. Meyer that deals with the allocation of resources within the transport sector. It has strong links to civil engineering. Transport economics differs from some other branches of economics in that the assumption of a spaceless, instantaneous economy does not hold. People and goods flow over networks at certain speeds. Demands peak. Advance ticket purchase is often induced by lower fares. The networks themselves may or may not be competitive. A single trip (the final good, in the consumer's eyes) may require the bundling of services provided by several firms, agencies and modes.

Although transport systems follow the same supply and demand theory as other industries, the complications of network effects and choices between dissimilar goods (e.g. car and bus travel) make estimating the demand for transportation facilities difficult. The development of models to estimate the likely choices between the goods involved in transport decisions (discrete choice models) led to the development of an important branch of econometrics, as well as a Nobel Prize for Daniel McFadden.

In transport, demand can be measured in number of journeys made or in total distance traveled across all journeys (e.g. passenger-kilometers for public transport or vehicle-kilometers of travel (VKT) for private transport). Supply is considered to be a measure of capacity. The price of the good (travel) is measured using the generalised cost of travel, which includes both money and time expenditure.

The effect of increases in supply (i.e. capacity) are of particular interest in transport economics (see induced demand), as the potential environmental consequences are significant (see externalities below).

== Externalities ==
In addition to providing benefits to their users, transport networks impose both positive and negative externalities on non-users. The consideration of these externalities – particularly the negative ones – is a part of transport economics.

Positive externalities of transport networks may include the ability to provide emergency services, increases in land value, and agglomeration benefits. Negative externalities are wide-ranging and may include local air pollution, noise pollution, light pollution, safety hazards, community severance and congestion. The contribution of transport systems to potentially hazardous climate change is a significant negative externality which is difficult to evaluate quantitatively, making it difficult (but not impossible) to include in transport economics-based research and analysis.

Congestion is considered a negative externality by economists. An externality occurs when a transaction causes costs or benefits to third party, often, although not necessarily, from the use of a public good. For example, manufacturing or transportation cause air pollution imposing costs on others when making use of public air.

=== Traffic congestion ===
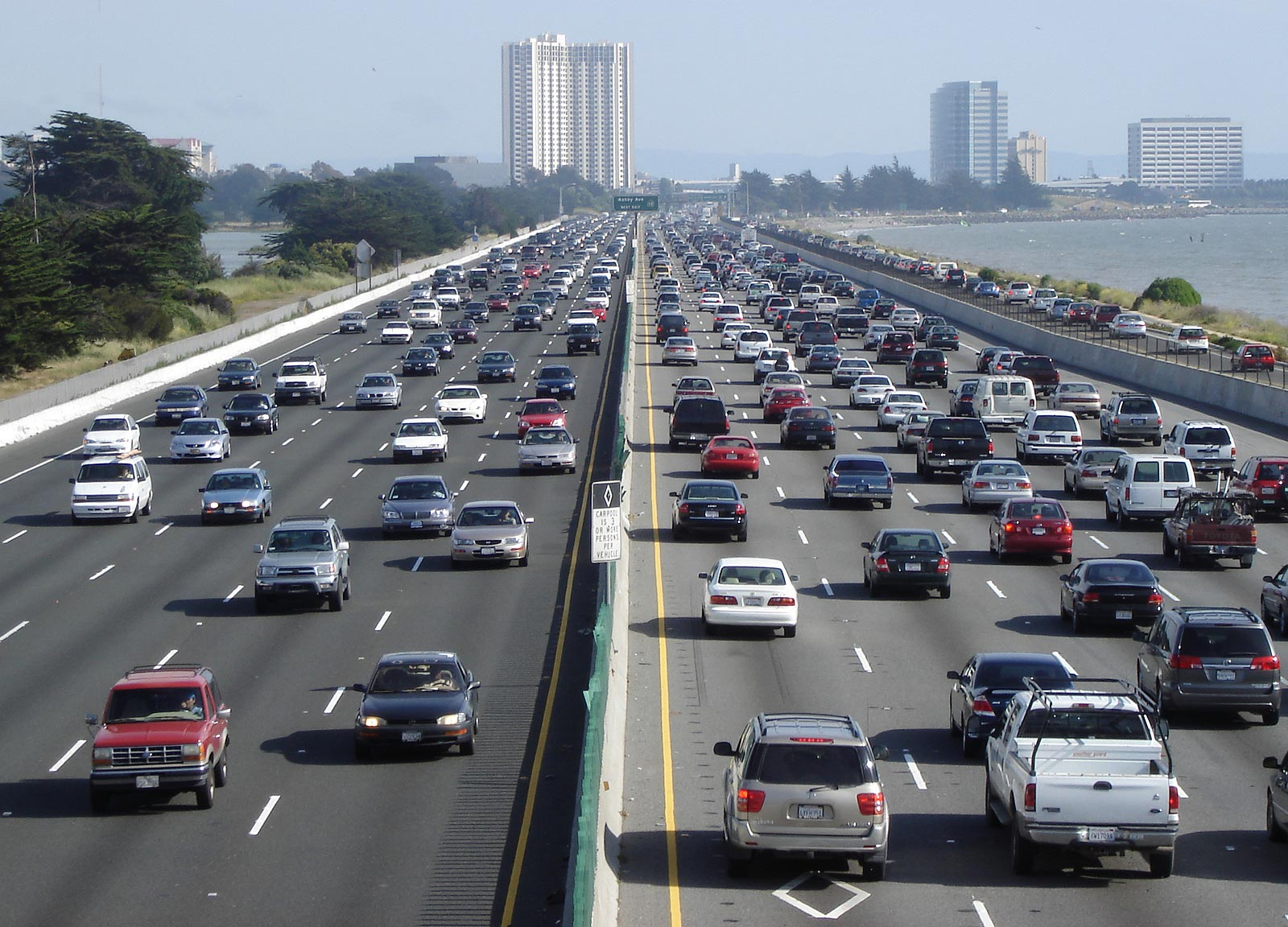
Typical traffic congestion in an urban freeway. Shown here is I-80 Eastshore Freeway in Berkeley, California.

Traffic congestion is a negative externality caused by various factors. A 2005 American study stated that there are seven root causes of congestion, and gives the following summary of their contributions: bottlenecks 40%, traffic incidents 25%, bad weather 15%, work zones 10%, poor signal timing 5%, and special events/other 5%. Within the transport economics community, congestion pricing is considered to be an appropriate mechanism to deal with this problem (i.e. to internalise the externality) by allocating scarce roadway capacity to users. Capacity expansion is also a potential mechanism to deal with traffic congestion, but is often undesirable (particularly in urban areas) and sometimes has questionable benefits (see induced demand). William Vickrey, winner of the 1996 Nobel Prize for his work on "moral hazard", is considered one of the fathers of congestion pricing, as he first proposed it for the New York City Subway in 1952. In the road transportation arena these theories were extended by Maurice Allais, a fellow Nobel prize winner "for his pioneering contributions to the theory of markets and efficient utilization of resources", Gabriel Roth who was instrumental in the first designs and upon whose World Bank recommendation the first system was put in place in Singapore. Reuben Smeed, the deputy director of the Transport and Road Research Laboratory was also a pioneer in this field, and his ideas were presented to the British government in what is known as the Smeed Report.

Congestion is not limited to road networks; the negative externality imposed by congestion is also important in busy public transport networks as well as crowded pedestrian areas, e.g. on the London Underground on a weekday or any urban train station, at peak times. There is the classical excess in demand compared to supply. This is because at peak times there is a large demand for trains, since people want to go home (i.e., a derived demand). However, space on the platforms and on the trains is limited and small compared to the demand for it. As a result, there are crowds of people outside the train doors and in the train station corridors. This increases delays for commuters, which can often cause a rise in stress or other problems. A possible solution for this is fare reduction for travel at off-peak times.

==== Congestion pricing ====
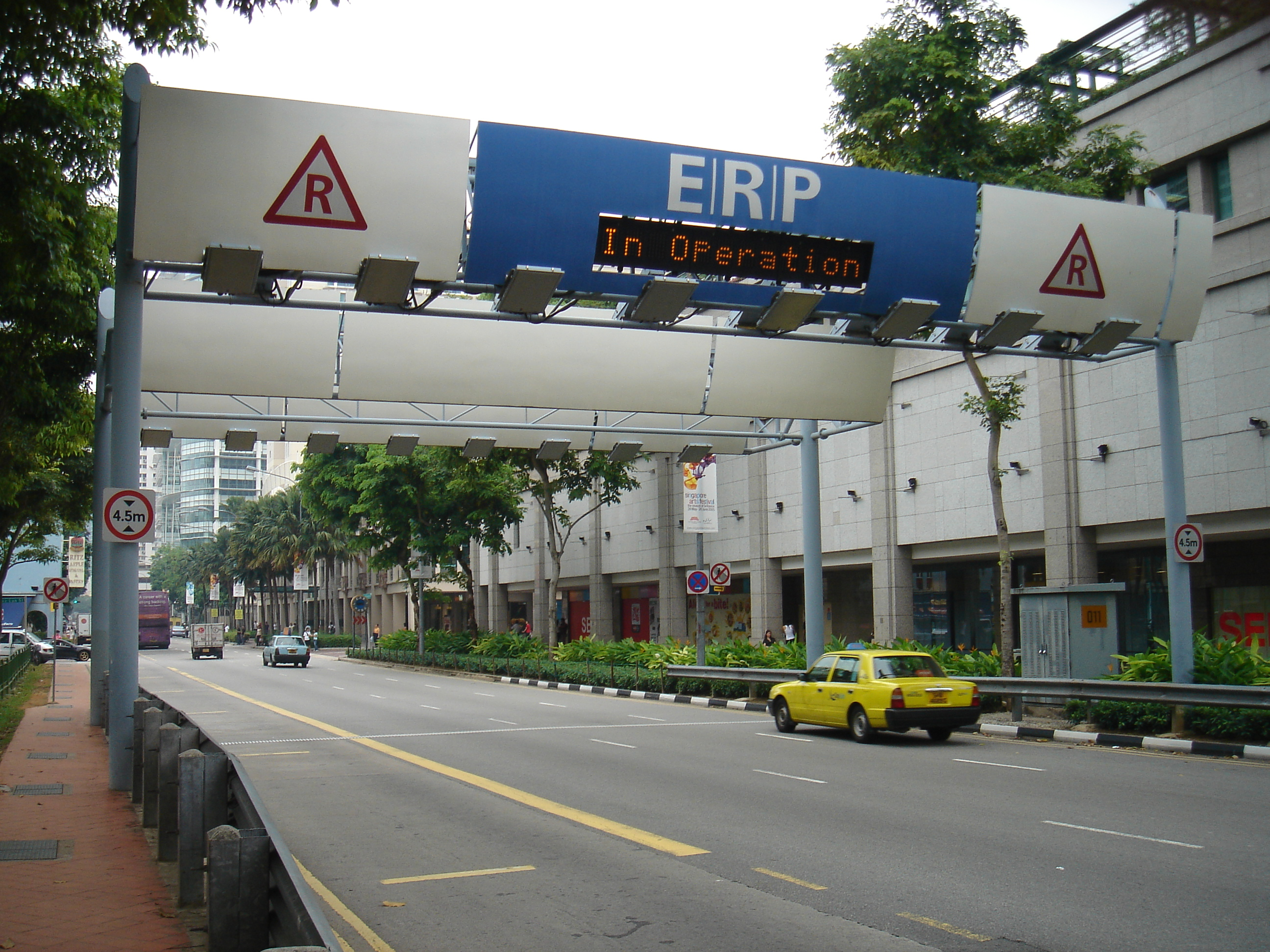
Electronic Road Pricing Gantry at North Bridge Road, Singapore

Congestion pricing is an efficiency pricing strategy that requires the users to pay more for that public good, thus increasing the welfare gain or net benefit for society. Congestion pricing is one of a number of alternative demand side (as opposed to supply side) strategies offered by economists to address congestion. Congestion pricing was first implemented in Singapore in 1975, together with a comprehensive package of road pricing measures, stringent car ownership rules and improvements in mass transit. Thanks to technological advances in electronic toll collection, Singapore upgraded its system in 1998 (see Singapore's Electronic Road Pricing). Similar pricing schemes were implemented in Rome in 2001, as an upgrade to the manual zone control system implemented in 1998; London in 2003 and extended in 2007 (see London congestion charge); Stockholm in 2006, as seven-month trial, and then on a permanent basis since August 2007 (see Stockholm congestion tax).

=== Pollution pricing ===
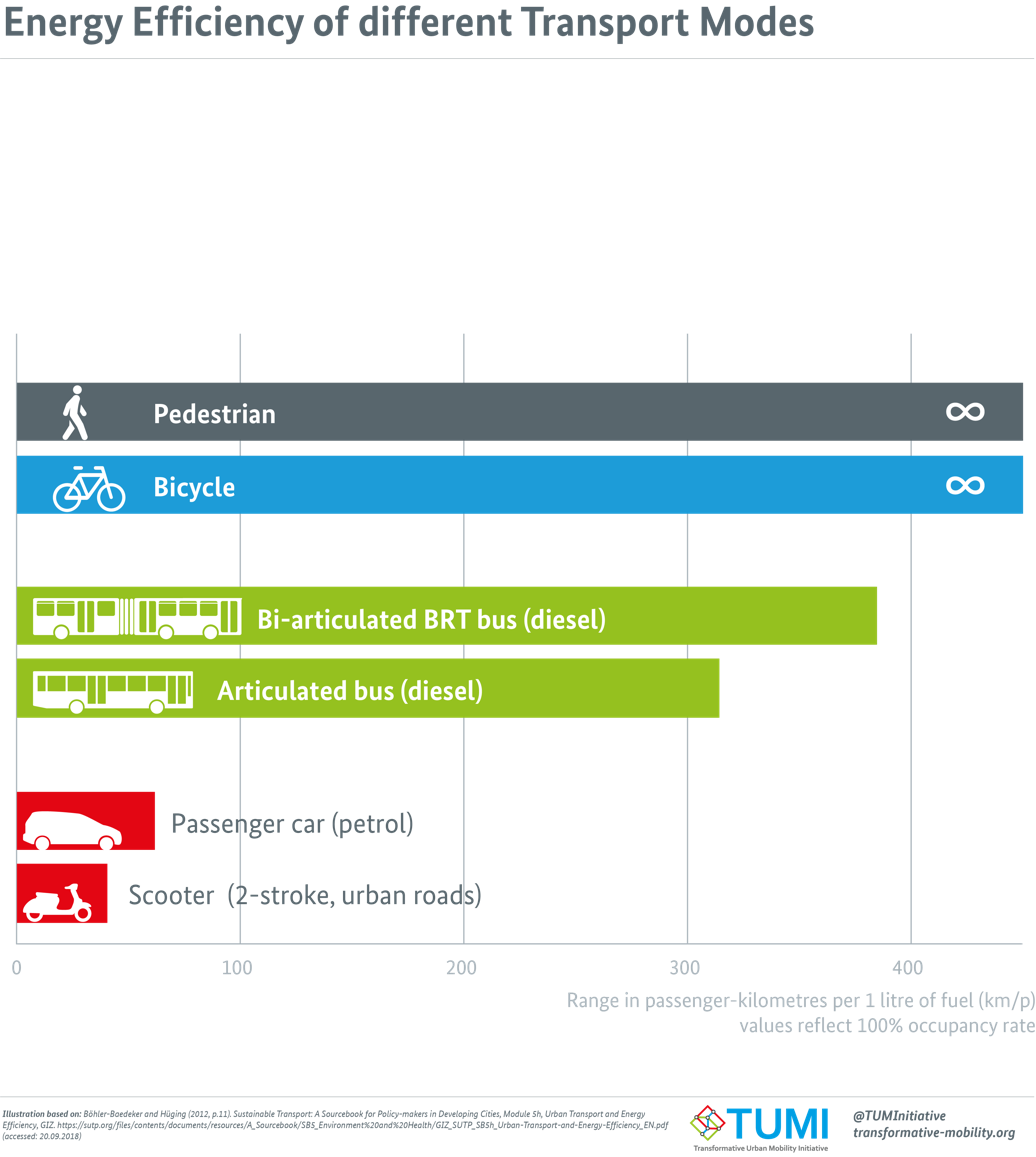
Energy Efficiency of different Transport Modes

From 2008 to 2011, Milan had a traffic charge scheme, Ecopass, that exempted higher emission standard vehicles (Euro IV) and other alternative fuel vehicles This was later replaced by a more conventional congestion pricing scheme, Area C.

Even the transport economists who advocate congestion pricing have anticipated several practical limitations, concerns and controversial issues regarding the actual implementation of this policy. As summarized by noted regional planner Robert Cervero: "True social-cost pricing of metropolitan travel has proven to be a theoretical ideal that so far has eluded real-world implementation. The primary obstacle is that except for professors of transportation economics and a cadre of vocal environmentalists, few people are in favor of considerably higher charges for peak-period travel. Middle-class motorists often complain they already pay too much in gasoline taxes and registration fees to drive their cars, and that to pay more during congested periods would add insult to injury. In the United States, few politicians are willing to champion the cause of congestion pricing in fear of reprisal from their constituents... Critics also argue that charging more to drive is elitist policy, pricing the poor off of roads so that the wealthy can move about unencumbered. It is for all these reasons that peak-period pricing remains a pipe dream in the minds of many."

==== Road space rationing ====
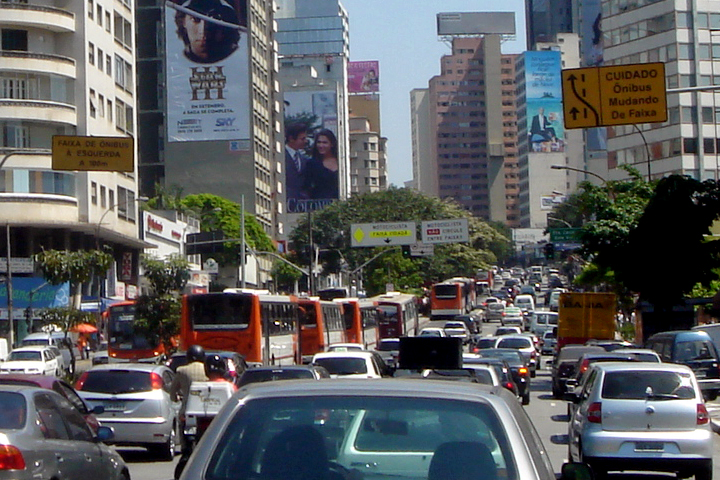
Traffic congestion persists in São Paulo, Brazil, despite no-drive days based on license numbers.

Transport economists consider road space rationing an alternative to congestion pricing, but road space rationing is considered more equitable, as the restrictions force all drivers to reduce auto travel, while congestion pricing restrains less those who can afford paying the congestion charge. Nevertheless, high-income users can avoid the restrictions by owning a second car. Moreover, congestion pricing (unlike rationing) acts "to allocate a scarce resource to its most valuable use, as evinced by users' willingness to pay for the resource". While some "opponents of congestion pricing fear that tolled roads will be used only by people with high income. But preliminary evidence suggests that the new toll lanes in California are used by people of all income groups. The ability to get somewhere fast and reliably is valued in a variety of circumstances. Not everyone will need or want to incur a toll on a daily basis, but on occasions when getting somewhere quickly is necessary, the option of paying to save time is valuable to people at all income levels." Road space rationing based on license numbers has been implemented in cities such as Athens (1982), México City (1989), São Paulo (1997), Santiago, Chile, Bogotá, Colombia, La Paz (2003), Bolivia, and San José (2005), Costa Rica.

==== Tradable mobility credits ====
A more acceptable policy on automobile travel restrictions, proposed by transport economists to avoid inequality and revenue allocation issues, is to implement a rationing of peak period travel but through revenue-neutral credit-based congestion pricing. This concept is similar to the existing system of emissions trading of carbon credits, proposed by the Kyoto Protocol to curb greenhouse emissions. Metropolitan area or city residents, or the taxpayers, will have the option to use the local government-issued mobility rights or congestion credits for themselves, or to trade or sell them to anyone willing to continue traveling by automobile beyond the personal quota. This trading system will allow direct benefits to be accrued by those users shifting to public transportation or by those reducing their peak-hour travel rather than the government.

== Funding and financing ==
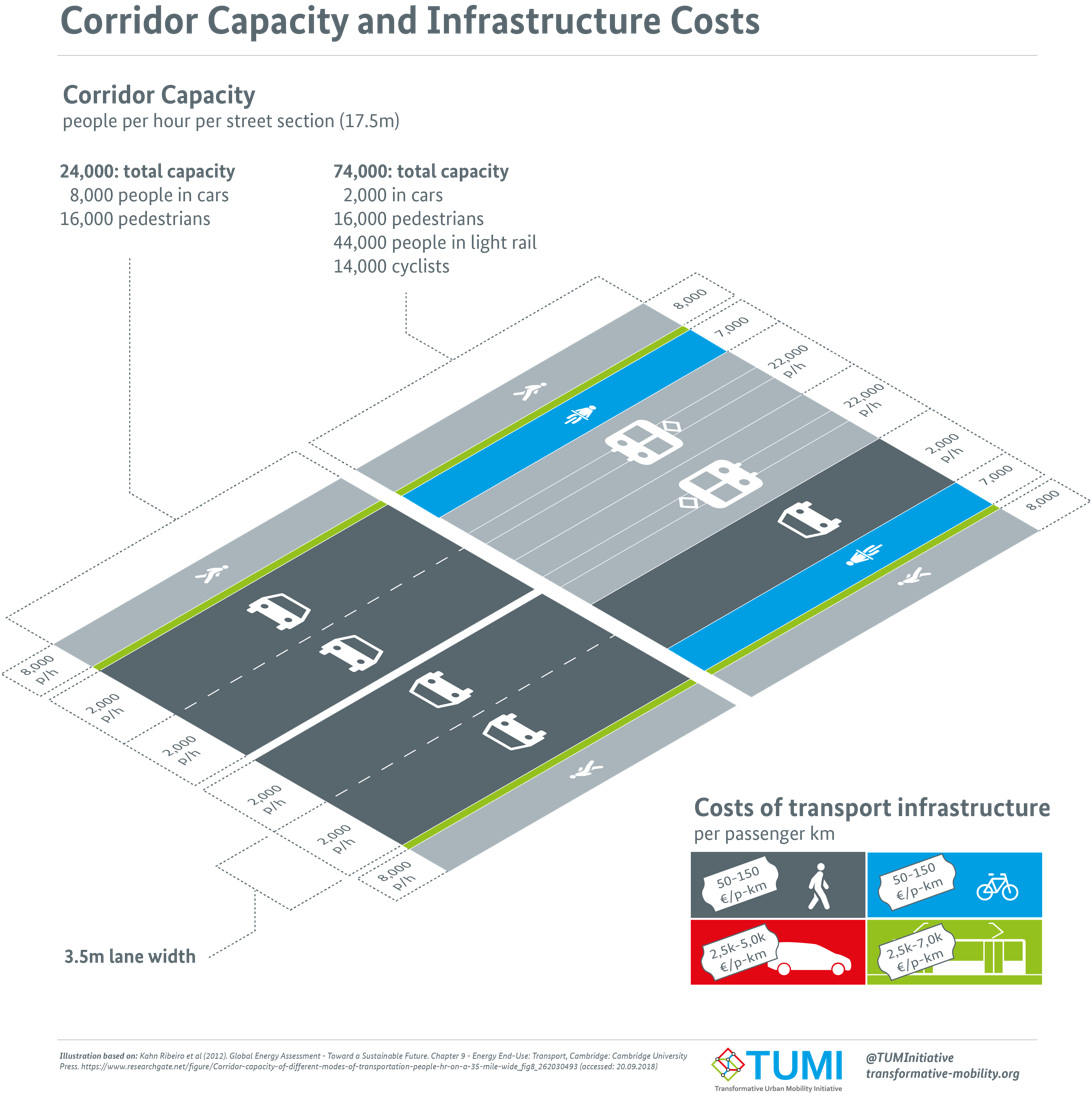
Corridor Capacity and Infrastructure Costs

Methods of funding and financing transport network maintenance, improvement and expansion are debated extensively and form part of the transport economics field.

Funding issues relate to the ways in which money is raised for the supply of transport capacity. Taxation and user fees are the main methods of fund-raising. Taxation may be general (e.g. income tax), local (e.g. sales tax or land value tax) or variable (e.g. fuel tax), and user fees may be tolls, congestion charges or fares. The method of funding often attracts strong political and public debate.

Financing issues relate to the way in which these funds are used to pay for the supply of transport. Loans, bonds, public–private partnerships and concessions are all methods of financing transport investment.

== Regulation and competition ==
Regulation of the supply of transport capacity relates to both safety regulation and economic regulation. Transport economics considers issues of the economic regulation of the supply of transport, particularly in relation to whether transport services and networks are provided by the public sector, by the private sector, or a mixture of both.

Transport networks and services can take on any combination of regulated/deregulated and public/private provision. For example, bus services in the UK outside London are provided by both the public and private sectors in a deregulated economic environment (where no-one specifies which services are to be provided, so the provision of services is influenced by the market), whereas bus services within London are provided by the private sector in a regulated economic environment (where the public sector specifies the services to be provided and the private sector competes for the right to supply those services – i.e. franchising).

The regulation of public transport is often designed to achieve some social, geographic and temporal equity as market forces might otherwise lead to services being limited to the most popular travel times along the most densely settled corridors of development. National, regional or municipal taxes are often deployed to provide a network that is socially acceptable (e.g. extending timetables through the daytime, weekend, holiday or evening periods and intensifying the mesh of routes beyond that which a lightly regulated market would probably provide).

Franchising may be used to create a supply of transport that balances the free-market supply outcome and the most socially desirable supply outcome.

== Project appraisal and evaluation ==
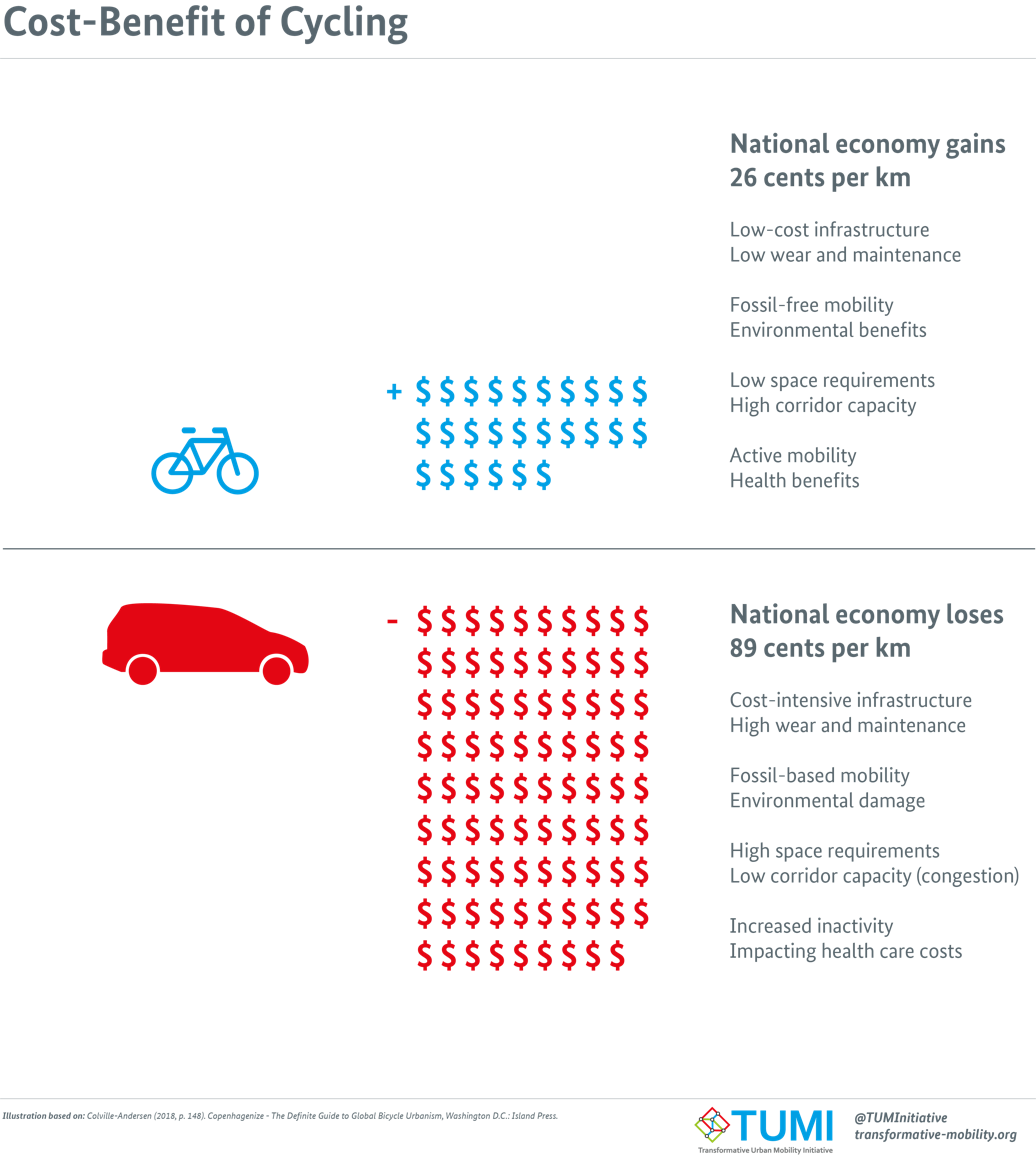

The most sophisticated methods of project appraisal and evaluation have been developed and applied in the transport sector. The terms appraisal and evaluation are often confused in relation to the assessment of projects. Appraisal refers to ex ante (before the event) assessment and evaluation refers to ex post (after the event) assessment.

=== Appraisal ===
The appraisal of changes in the transport network is one of the most important applications of transport economics. In order to make an assessment of whether any given transport project should be carried out, transport economics can be used to compare the costs of the project with its benefits (both social and financial). Such an assessment is known as a cost-benefit analysis, and is usually a fundamental piece of information for decision-makers, as it places a value on the net benefits (or disbenefits) of schemes and generates a ratio of benefits to costs which may be used to prioritise projects when funding is constrained.

A primary difficulty in project appraisal is the valuation of time. Travel time savings are often cited as a key benefit of transport projects, but people in different occupations, carrying out different activities and in different social classes value time differently.

Appraising projects on the basis of their supposed reductions in travel times has come under scrutiny in recent years with the recognition that improvements in capacity generate trips that would not have been made (induced demand), partially eroding the benefits of reduced travel times. Therefore, an alternative method of appraisal is to measure changes in land value and consumer benefits from a transport project rather than the measuring benefits accruing to travellers themselves. However, this method of analysis is much more difficult to carry out.

Another problem is that many transport projects have impacts that cannot be expressed in monetary terms, such as impacts on, for example, local air quality, biodiversity and community severance. Whilst these impacts can be included in a detailed environmental impact assessment, a key issue has been how to present these assessments alongside estimates of those costs and benefits that can be expressed in monetary terms. Recent developments in transport appraisal practice in some European countries have seen the application of multi-criteria decision analysis based decision support tools. These build on existing cost-benefit analysis and environmental impact assessment techniques and help decision makers weigh up the monetary and non-monetary impacts of transport projects. In the UK, one such application, the New Approach to Appraisal has become a cornerstone of UK transport appraisal.

=== Evaluation ===
The evaluation of projects enables decision makers to understand whether the benefits and costs that were estimated in the appraisal materialised. Successful project evaluation requires that the necessary data to carry out the evaluation is specified in advance of carrying out the appraisal.

The appraisal and evaluation of projects form stages within a broader policy making cycle that includes:

- identifying a rationale for a project
- specifying objectives
- appraisal
- monitoring implementation of a project
- evaluation
- feedback to inform future projects

== Social effects on poverty ==
In the US those with low income living in cities face a problem called “poverty transportation.” The problem arises because many of the entry-level jobs which are sought out by those with little education are typically located in suburban areas. Those jobs are also not very accessible by public transportation because the transportation was often designed to move people around cities, which becomes a problem when the jobs are no longer located in the cities. Those who cannot afford cars inevitably suffer the worst, because they have no choice but to rely on public transport. The problem is illustrated by an estimation that 70% of entry-level jobs are located in the suburbs, while only 32% of those jobs are within a quarter mile of public transportation. More difficult (or more expensive) access to jobs and other goods & services can act as a ghetto tax.

As a result of the transportation systems in use, but not adequately meeting the needs of those who rely on them, they tend to generate low revenue. And with minimal revenue or funding the transportation systems are forced to decrease service and increase fares, which causes those in poverty to face more inequality. Further those who live in cities with no public transportation become even more excluded from education and work. In places with no public transport a car is the only viable option and that creates unnecessary strain on the roads and environment.

Since automobile use tends to be greater than public transportation use, it also becomes the norm for people to work towards car ownership. Private car ownership has led to a large allocation of resources towards road and bridge maintenance. But underfunding of public transportation prevents everyone who needs transportation from having access to it. And those who can choose between public transportation and private transportation will choose private transportation rather than face the inconveniences of public transportation. The lack of customers willing to use public transport creates a cycle that ultimately never leads to the transportation systems making significant progress. Another reason for low private vehicle ownership among welfare recipients are the established asset limitations. In the U.S. the asset limit is $1000 per vehicle. This forces welfare recipients to purchase old and sub standard vehicles in order not to lose their welfare funding.

There are a number of ways in which public transportation could be improved and for it to become a better and more enticing option for other people who do not necessarily depend on it. Some of these include creating networks of overlapping routes even among different operators to give people more choice in where and how they want to go somewhere. The system should also function as a whole, to prevent drivers from dangerously racing along routes to increase profit. Providing incentives to use public transportation can also be beneficial, as ridership increases the transportation systems can appropriately respond by increasing the frequency along those transportation routes. Even creating bus only lanes or priority lanes at intersections could improve service and speed.

Experiments done in Africa (Uganda and Tanzania) and Sri Lanka on hundreds of households have shown that a bicycle can increase the income of a poor family by as much as 35%. Transport, if analyzed for the cost-benefit analysis for rural poverty alleviation, has given one of the best returns in this regard. For example, road investments in India were a staggering 3–10 times more effective than almost all other investments and subsidies in rural economy in the decade of the 1990s. What a road does at a macro level to increase transport, the bicycle supports at the micro level. Bicycle, in that sense, can be one of the best means to eradicate the poverty in poor nations.

== Car taxation ==
Car taxation is an instrument to influence the purchase decisions of consumers. Taxes can be differentiated to support the market introduction of fuel efficient and low carbon dioxide (CO_{2}) emitting cars.

The European Union Commission has made a proposal for a Council Directive on passenger car taxation which is currently before the Council and Parliament.

The Commission encourages again Member States to adopt this proposal as soon as possible and to adapt their car taxation policies so as to promote the purchase of fuel efficient cars throughout the EU and help manufacturers respect the upcoming fuel efficiency framework, thus contributing their share to reducing the CO_{2} emissions of cars. Taxes differentiated over the whole range of cars on the market, so as to gradually induce a switch towards less emitting cars, would be an efficient way to reduce compliance costs for manufacturers.

=== Tax rates on acquisition ===
In 2011, for a brand new VW Golf Trendline (80 PS, 5G 2T) the taxation rate (all inclusive, i.e. VAT+registration tax+any other taxes) on acquisition was as follows:

Country	After tax (in €)	Before tax (in €)	Taxation rate (%)
Denmark	28267	11629	143.07
Finland	18000	11795	52.61
Netherlands	19543	13191	48.15
Ireland	18036	12712	41.88
Sweden	18576	14299	29.91
Latvia	14352	11292	27.1
Austria	17995	14202	26.71
Lithuania	14024	11292	24.19
Romania	14419	11628	24
Poland	14215	11557	23
Italy	17379	14141	22.9
Spain	17415	14187	22.75
Hungary	16918	13790	22.68
Cyprus	15292	12586	21.5
Belgium	17754	14673	21
Czech Rep.	14059	11715	20.01
Bulgaria	14347	11956	20
United Kingdom	17078	14232	20
Slovenia	15274	12729	19.99
France	15478	12942	19.6
Germany	16825	14139	19
Luxembourg	15300	13305	14.99
Greece	N/A	N/A	N/A
Malta	N/A	N/A	N/A
Portugal	N/A	N/A	N/A
Slovakia	N/A	N/A	N/A
Estonia	N/A	N/A	N/A

== See also ==
- Car costs
- Car dependency
- Economics of car use
- Effects of the car on societies
- Externalities of automobiles
- Free public transport
- Infrastructure
- List of important publications in economics
- Low-emission zone
- Outline of economics
- Peak car
- Rail subsidies
- Road space rationing
- Road tax
- Sustainable transport
- Transit-oriented development
- Transport divide
- Transport finance
- Vignette (road tax)
