= Stockholm congestion tax =

Fee for vehicles entering central Stockholm

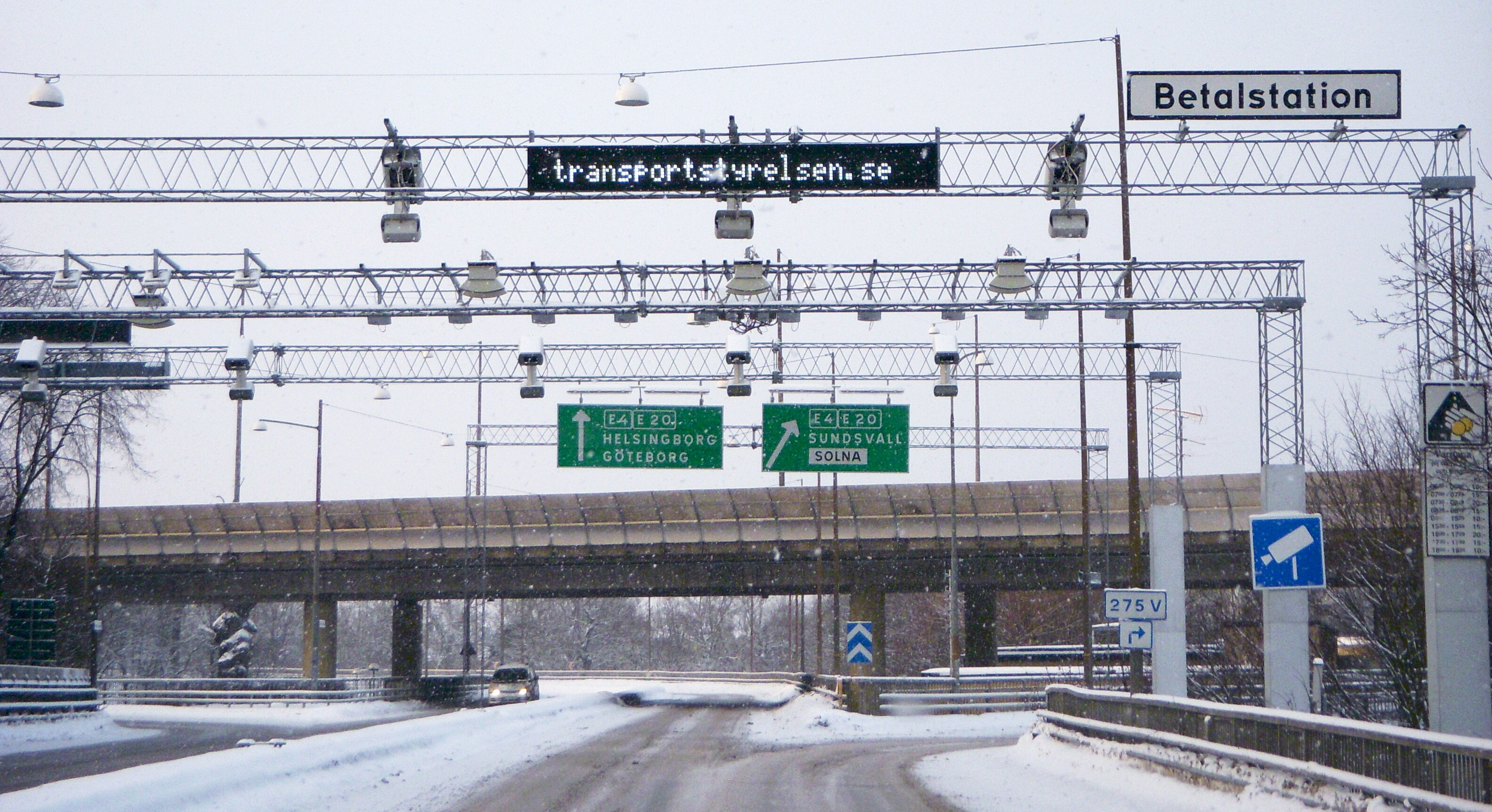
The control point up to Essingeleden.

The Stockholm congestion tax (Swedish: Trängselskatt i Stockholm), also referred to as the Stockholm congestion charge, is a congestion pricing system implemented as a tax levied on most vehicles entering and exiting central Stockholm, Sweden. The congestion tax was implemented on a permanent basis on 1 August 2007, after a seven-month trial period between 3 January 2006 and 31 July 2006. It was inspired by Singapore's Electronic Road Pricing (ERP) system, which was first introduced as the Area Licensing Scheme in 1975.

The primary purpose of the congestion tax is to reduce traffic congestion and improve the environmental situation in central Stockholm. The funds collected will be used for new road constructions in and around Stockholm.

A referendum was held in September 2006, a few months after the end of the trial period. In the referendum the residents of Stockholm municipality voted yes and in 14 other municipalities voted no to implement it permanently. On 1 October 2006, the leaders of the winning parties in the 2006 general election, declared they would implement the Stockholm congestion tax permanently. The Riksdag approved this on 20 June 2007, and the congestion tax came into effect on 1 August 2007.

On 1 January 2016, congestion taxes were increased in the inner-city parts of Stockholm, and also the congestion tax began to be charged on Essingeleden. The measure was implemented not only to improve accessibility and the environment, but also to help develop the infrastructure.

== Affected area ==
The congestion tax area encompasses essentially the entire Stockholm City Centre, which includes Södermalm, Norrmalm, Östermalm, Vasastaden, Kungsholmen, Stora Essingen, Lilla Essingen and Djurgården.

There are unmanned electronic control points (in Swedish: betalstation, literally payment station) at all entrances to this area. The congestion tax is applied on both entry and exit of the affected area.

From 1 January 2016, the congestion tax began to be charged in on Essingeleden motorway. Congestion tax was introduced at the access and exit ramps of two interchanges on Essingeleden in order to reduce traffic jams in peak periods, and with shorter traffic jams on Essingeleden, the surrounding roads are expected to have shorter tailbacks. The control points on Essingeleden are located at the Kristineberg Interchange and at the access and exit ramps for Tranebergsbron at the Fredhäll Interchange. The transport agencies involved expect to reduce traffic on Essingeleden by some 10% in peak hours. One week after the tax began to be charged, traffic on the motorway had decreased by 22% compared to a normal day in mid-December.

== Amount of tax to pay ==
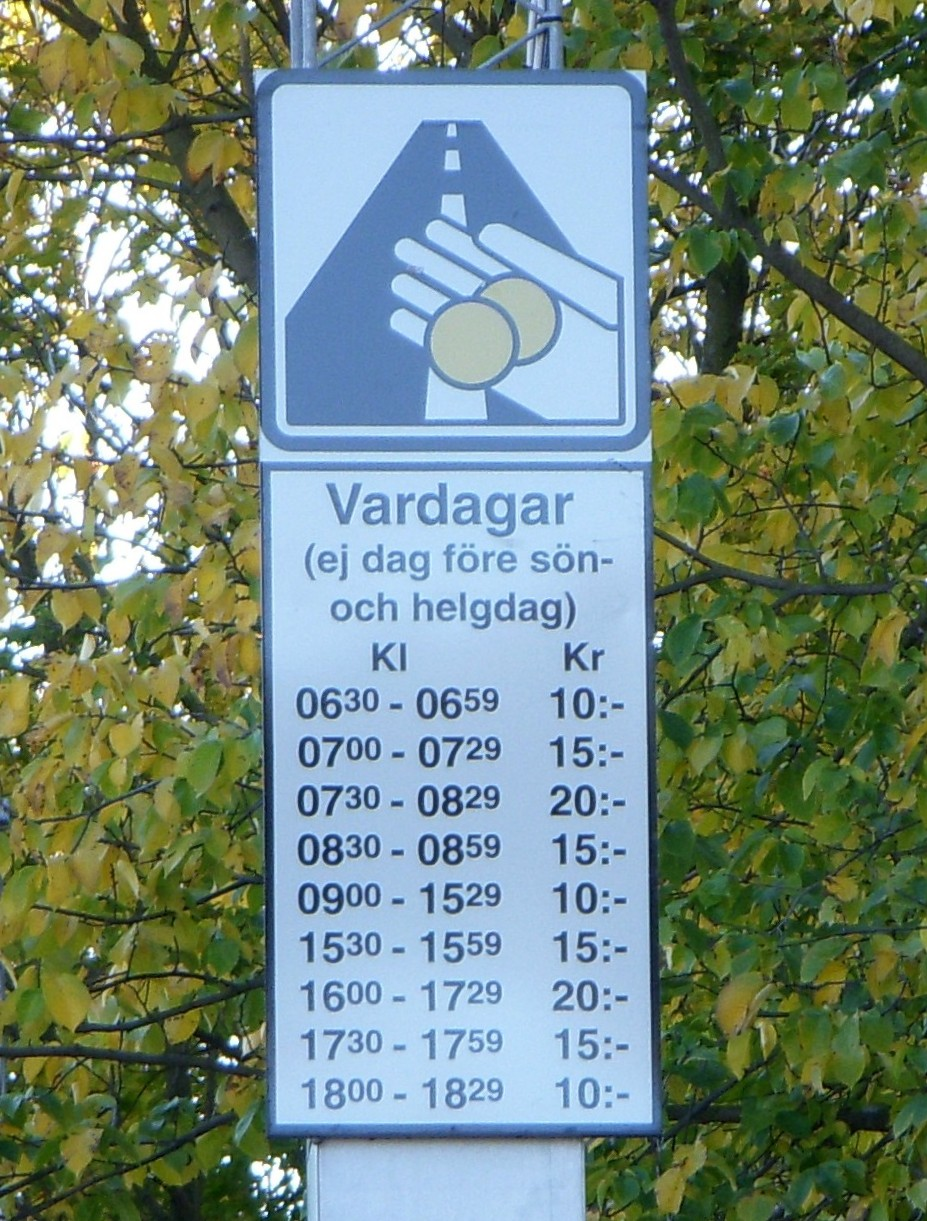
Traffic sign showing the congestion tax levied until December 2015.

The amount of tax payable depends on what time of the day a motorist enters or exits the congestion tax area. There is no charge on Saturdays, Sundays, public holidays or the day before public holidays, nor during nights (18:30 – 06:29), nor during the month of July.

The congestion tax was raised in January 2016, the first increase of the tax since it was introduced permanently in 2007. The highest increase took place at the two highest rush hour periods, 7:30 to 8:29, and 16:00 to 17:29, from SEK 20 to SEK 35. The objective was to steer the traffic towards other times of the day and public transport, and in this way reduce congestion in the Inner City area. Also the maximum amount levied was raised to SEK 105 per day and vehicle. The additional funds will contribute to finance the extension of the Stockholm Metro.

The following table summarizes the charges for Essingeleden and the Inner City since 1 January 2016.

Time of day	Tax Inner City	Tax Essingeleden ¹	
00:00 – 06:29	0 SEK	0 SEK	0 €
06:30 – 06:59	15 SEK	15 SEK	1.62 €
07:00 – 07:29	25 SEK	22 SEK	2.38 €
07:30 – 08:29	35 SEK	30 SEK	3.24 €
08:30 – 08:59	25 SEK	22 SEK	2.38 €
09:00 – 09:29	15 SEK	15 SEK	1.62 €
09:30 – 14:59	11 SEK	11 SEK	1.19 €
15:00 – 15:29	15 SEK	15 SEK	1.62 €
15:30 – 15:59	25 SEK	22 SEK	2.38 €
16:00 – 17:29	35 SEK	30 SEK	3.24 €
17:30 – 17:59	25 SEK	22 SEK	2.38 €
18:00 – 18:29	15 SEK	15 SEK	1.62 €
18:30 – 23:59	0 SEK	0 SEK	0 €

1) Tax amount shown in Euro for comparative purposes. Currency rates as of 12 January 2016.

=== Method of payment ===
Official Swedish "Road toll" sign

Payment of the congestion tax cannot be made at the control points — they merely register which vehicles have passed them. A bill is sent to the vehicle owner at the end of each month, with the tax decisions for the preceding month's control point passages. The bill must be paid before the end of the next month. The vehicle owner is responsible for the payment of the tax, even if the bill does not arrive.

The bill can be delivered in three different ways. By default delivery by mail to the vehicle owner's registered address, or opting for electronic delivery to the vehicle owner's Internet bank, or opting for a direct debit arrangement called Autogiro that allows the tax to be automatically deducted from the vehicle owner's bank account when the bill is due.

Failure to pay the tax within the allotted time results in a reminder bill being sent with an added 500 SEK fee. If the tax along with the reminder fee is still unpaid within 30 days after the reminder bill was sent, the case will be forwarded to the Swedish Enforcement Administration, which adds an additional fee of at least 600 SEK, and the vehicle owner will be noted in the Enforcement Register unless payment is made.

The same rules are from 2015 valid for foreign-registered vehicles. The authority has contracted collection agencies in the most common countries who charge the owners.

=== Tax deductibility ===
The congestion tax may be deducted from taxable income for both private individuals and businesses. Private individuals may deduct the congestion tax for business journeys, and for traveling between the home and workplace according to the usual rules of car cost deduction (1:80 SEK/km), that is if the distance is at least 5 kilometres (3.1 mi) and the time saved by traveling by own car compared to public transport is at least 2 hours per day. If this is not valid, the public transport cost can be deducted (without congestion tax). The first 10.000 SEK can not be deducted (the public transport pass inside Stockholm county costs 8.400 SEK during year 2016). Businesses may deduct all congestion tax expenses, also private driving with company cars (there is a general tax on the right to drive company cars in private).

== Exemptions from the congestion tax ==
=== Exempt vehicles ===
Some classes of vehicles are exempt from the congestion tax:

- Emergency services vehicles
- Buses with a total weight of at least 14 tonnes
- Diplomatic corps registered vehicles
- Motorcycles
- Military vehicles
- Cars with parking permit for disabled persons, after application to the Swedish National Tax Board. This exemption is not valid if the car is used for professional purposes.

Foreign-registered vehicles were exempt from the congestion tax until 2014. This was mainly for practical reasons, as it was hard to get access to foreign car registers and to claim payment from foreign citizens. The exemption was removed as a result of objections from companies relating to unfair taxation, and because the "Eurovignette" EU directive (1999/62/EC article 7 and 2006/38/EC) requires that user charges may not discriminate on the grounds of the nationality of the haulier or the origin of the vehicle.

== Technology ==
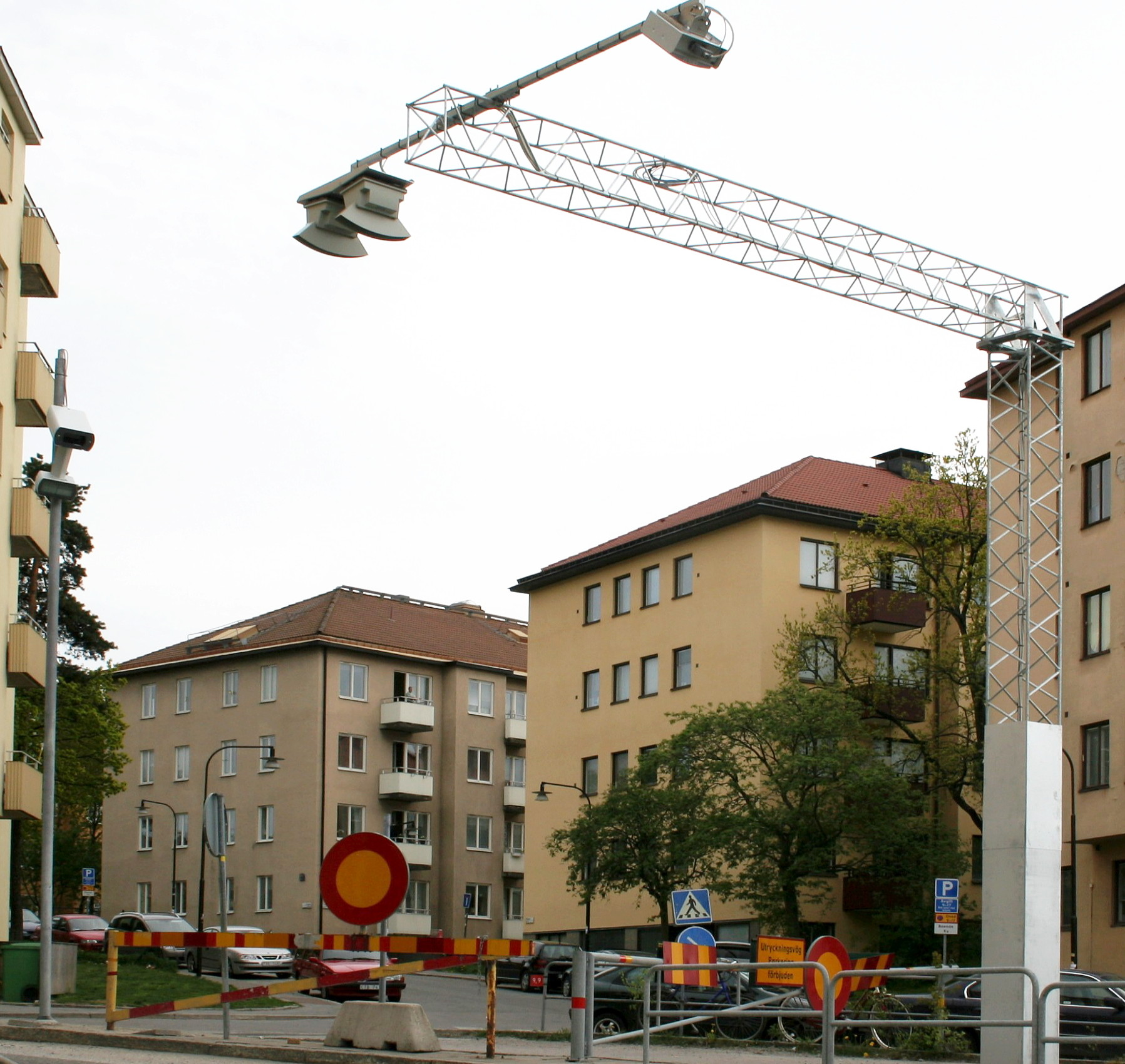
Automatic detection system at Stockholm's first electronic gantry at Lilla Essingen.

The vehicles passing the control points are identified through automatic number plate recognition. The equipment, consisting of cameras, laser detectors, antennas, and information signs are mounted on a set of gantries at each control point. There are no payment booths at the control points, they are all unmanned and payment is done by other means later (see Method of payment above). At a traditional toll booth, a substantial percentage of the toll goes to costs for the staff, which is avoided here.

For those living on the island of Lidingö or otherwise often traveling there, an optional DSRC transponder can be used also to more accurately identify the vehicles, as an incorrect identification results in the Lidingö exemption rule not taking effect (see Geographic exemptions above). The DSRC transponders that were used during the congestion tax trial period are useless now and should be returned to the Swedish Road Administration.

== History ==
=== Debate ===
The congestion tax was before its inception a highly debated proposition, especially in the peripheral parts of Stockholm county where residents who lived outside of the control points but worked in the city center argued that they should also have a say in whether the proposition was to be accepted. In the time since the control points were put in place, however, the debate has calmed down considerably as the system works smoothly and the actual cost of passing these stations is acceptable to most residents, as well as the fact that central Stockholm has been getting cleaner since the proposition went into action. The debate has instead in many instances shifted toward the political reasons behind the proposition, where some argue that the proposition is simply a way to punish the residents of Stockholm for the centralized Swedish political system, which reportedly many people in rural parts of Sweden feel favours Stockholm above other regions.

Initially this was planned as a congestion fee, not a tax. But the Swedish government ruled that this kind of endeavor was considered a tax and not a fee, and thus this was made a governmental tax, not a local tax, as municipalities in Sweden are not allowed to create new taxes.

=== Trial period ===
A seven-month trial period of the congestion tax, called The Stockholm trials (Stockholmsförsöket), took place between 3 January 2006 and 31 July 2006. In addition to the optical recognition of license plates, DSRC transponders were used to identify vehicles, and opting to use one was a precondition for using direct debit for the payment of the tax.

The Road Administration have claimed that traffic passing in and out of the cordon reduced by between 20 and 25% during the period of the trial, and that air quality improved; after the trial, traffic volumes built up again. 96% complied with paying the tax on time, which raised 399 m SEK during the period.

=== Referendum ===
Local consultative referendums regarding whether to permanently implement the congestion tax were held in Stockholm Municipality and several other municipalities in Stockholm County on 17 September 2006.

It was only the referendum in Stockholm Municipality that the at the time reigning government would use as a basis for the decision. The municipalities surrounding Stockholm in Stockholm County, especially those that are part of the city of Stockholm, showed discontent with the fact that the people of those municipalities get no say whether the congestion taxes will be implemented permanently. A substantial number of the inhabitants of the nearby municipalities travel to and from work through the congestion tax area. Therefore, several of these municipalities decided also to have local referendums. A municipality is allowed to hold a consultative referendum at any time, but as the congestion tax had to be decided at the national parliament level it was unclear how the results would be interpreted if the government there changed after the 2006 general election, which was held the same day as these referendums.

In Stockholm the question asked on the ballots was (translated from Swedish): sv:Trängselskatt i Stockholm#Fördelning och demokrati

Environmental fees/congestion tax means that fees will be charged in road traffic with the purpose to reduce queuing and improve the environment. The income will be returned to the Stockholm region for investments in public transport and roads.

In the other municipalities the question on the ballots were (translated from Swedish):

Do you believe that congestion tax should be permanently introduced in Stockholm?

==== Results ====
Results from the referendums. The figures and percentages do not include blank and invalid votes.

Map showing the results of the referendum in each municipality. 'Yes'-majority. 'No'-majority. No referendum held.

Municipality	Votes		
Municipality	#	Yes	No
Danderyd	16,962	32.5%	67.5%
Ekerö	13,528	39.9%	60.1%
Haninge	37,548	40.8%	59.2%
Lidingö	24,926	29.6%	70.4%
Nacka	44,785	42.9%	57.1%
Nynäshamn	12,588	41.2%	58.8%
Salem	7,563	39.6%	60.4%
Sollentuna	32,409	40.8%	59.2%
Solna	35,598	43.9%	56.1%
Stockholm	458,786	53.0%	47.0%
Tyresö	22,526	44.3%	55.7%
Täby	35,630	34.2%	65.8%
Vallentuna	14,884	42.5%	57.5%
Vaxholm	5,699	45.9%	54.1%
Österåker	20,140	40.9%	59.1%
Total excluding Stockholm	324,786	39.8%	60.2%
Total	783,572	47.5%	52.5%

==== Interpretation of the results ====
Prior to, and a short while after, the election day it was not clear how big of an effect the results of the municipal referendums would have, especially for the referendums held in the municipalities other than Stockholm.

The Social Democratic government prior to the 2006 general election (cabinet Persson) stated that they would only take into consideration the results of the referendum held in Stockholm Municipality, while the opposition parties (Alliance for Sweden) stated that they would take into consideration the results of referendums the other municipalities as well if they won the election.

The opposition parties won the election and before they formed a government (cabinet Reinfeldt) their party leaders announced on 1 October 2006 to implement the congestion tax permanently, and that the revenue would go entirely to new road constructions in and around Stockholm instead of entirely to public transport in Stockholm as it was during the trial period. The Riksdag approved the congestion tax on 20 June 2007, for reintroduction on 1 August 2007.

== Effects ==
Annual Stockholm congestion index from 2006 when the congestion tax was first applied.

From 2006 to 2012, despite a reduction in traffic and increase in favorable public opinion congestion in Stockholm increased by five percent.

== Criticism ==
=== Automatic number plate recognition ===
The automatic number-plate recognition has its shortcomings. Number plates from Finland, Lithuania and Hungary have a similar format compared to Swedish number plates, with three letters and three digits. The system can't see the difference, and a Swedish owner might falsely be charged. Also stolen and forged plates have caused false payment demand on innocent people. All vehicles are photographed so people who notice the false charging and object will have the charge waived.

== See also ==
- Road pricing
- Congestion pricing
- Electronic toll collection

Specific congestion pricing schemes:

- Congestion pricing in New York City
- Electronic Road Pricing (Singapore)
- Gothenburg congestion tax
- London congestion charge
- Manchester congestion charge
- Milan Area C
- San Francisco congestion pricing
- Singapore Area Licensing Scheme
