= Milan Area C =

Congestion charge in Milan, Italy

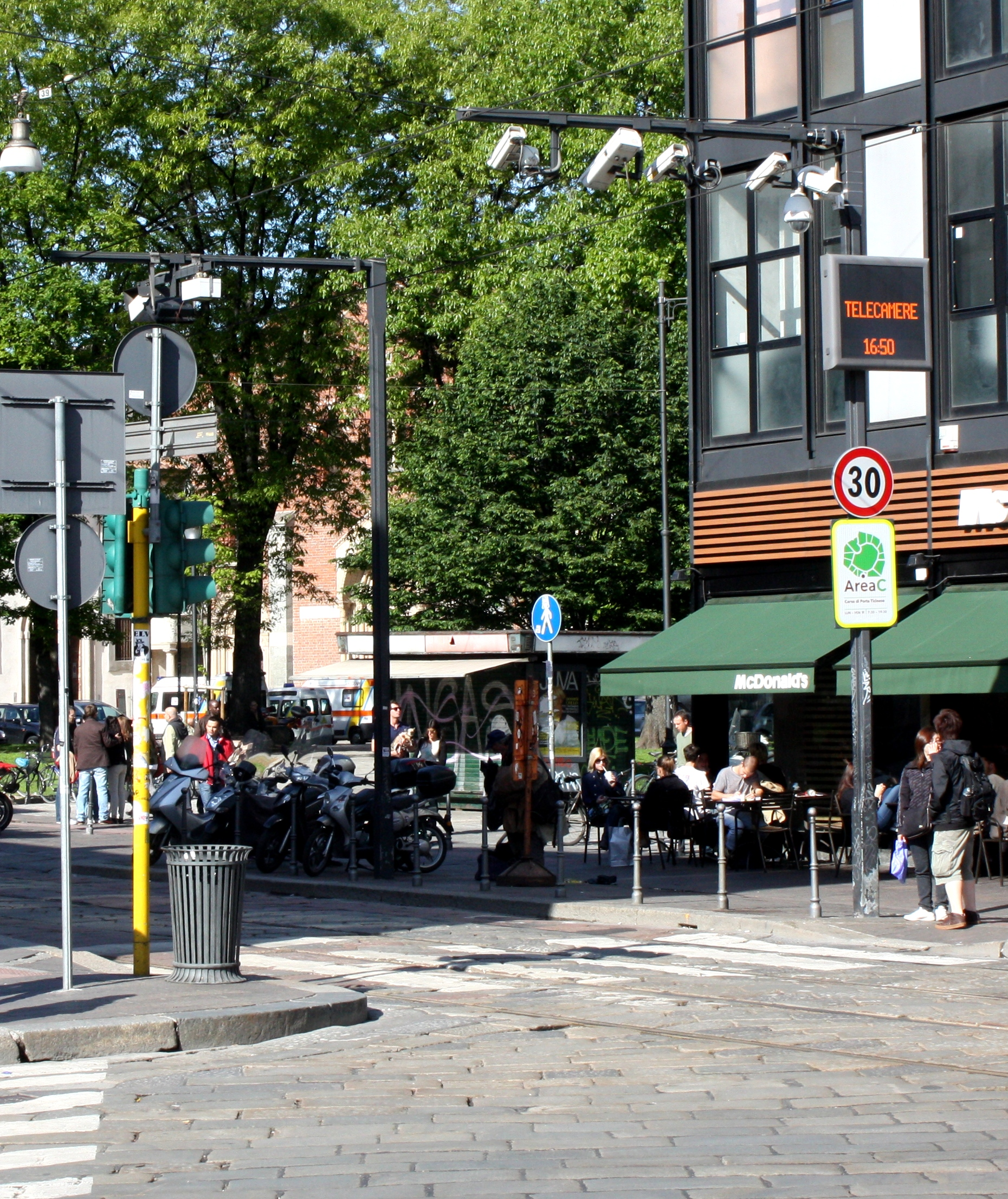
Area C gate in Porta Ticinese

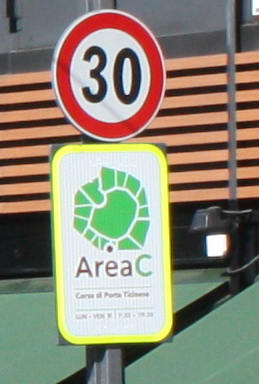
Area C sign

Area C is a congestion charge active in the city center of Milan, Italy. It was introduced in 2012, replacing the previous pollution charge Ecopass and based on the same designated traffic restricted zone. The area is about 8.2 km^{2} (3.2 sq mi) with 77,000 residents (4.5% and 6% of the city total, respectively) and is accessible through gates monitored by traffic cameras.

The objective of the program is to reduce traffic, promote public transport, and to decrease the high levels of smog in the city. All net revenues from the system are used to promote public transport and sustainable mobility. Like its predecessor Ecopass, the congestion charge was highly criticized, although it decreased vehicle entrances into the city by about 30%, increased average speeds of buses, and reduced levels of pollution. The program was temporarily suspended in 2020 due to the COVID-19 pandemic in Italy; as of August 2023, it has been reactivated.

== Background ==
In 2007 Milan had one of the highest European rates of car ownership, as more than half of Milan citizens owned private cars and motorcycles, ranking second only after Rome, and among the highest in the world. A 2007 study by environmental group Legambiente found that Milan also had some of the highest concentration of airborne particulate matter in Europe. It ranked third among large European cities both in terms of average annual level and number of days exceeding the European Union limit of 50 micrograms per cubic metre of coarse particulates (PM10). Due to its lingering air pollution problems and associated health problems, in 2007, and for a trial period, the city banned 170,000 older cars and motorcycles that do not pass strict environmental emission standards.

In January 2008, the mayor of Milan, Letizia Moratti, launched the Ecopass program expecting a 30% cut in pollution levels and a 10% reduction in traffic. The program imposed a charge on vehicles with higher pollution levels. Ecopass was an incentive for motorists to buy less polluting cars, and in a few years the number of cars with free access were the majority. Although these vehicles had less polluting engines, the free access helped less with the congestion problem. This trend contributed to a return to previous traffic levels and at the same time reduced revenue collected. This threatened the ability to keep the system in operation.

Area C was proposed and accepted in a 2011 referendum. The objective of the program was to drastically reduce the chronic traffic jams that take place in the city of Milan, to promote sustainable mobility and public transport, and to reduce the dangerously unhealthy smog. It was introduced on 16 January 2012 as a 18-month pilot program, replacing Ecopass. Area C was definitively approved as a permanent program on 27 March 2013, in advance of the expiration of the experimental period.

== Description ==
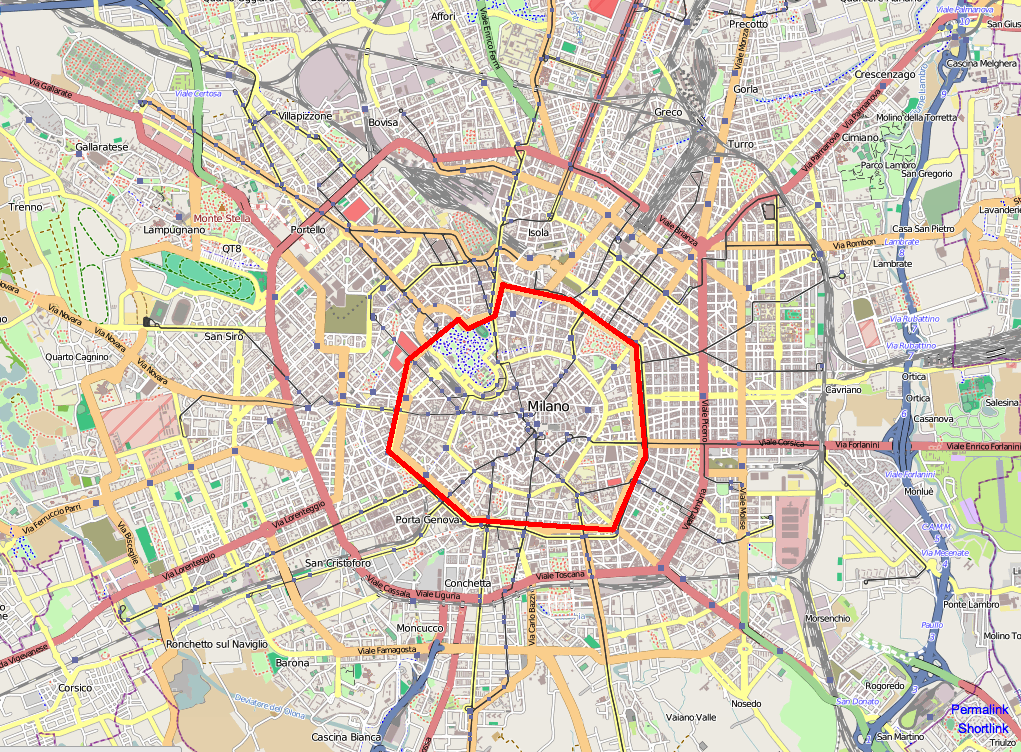
Area C traffic restricted zone (ZTL)

The congestion charge is based on the same designated traffic restricted zone or ZTL (Italian: Zona a Traffico Limitato) used by Ecopass, corresponding to the central Cerchia dei Bastioni area. The ZTL encompasses about 8.2 km^{2} (3.2 sq mi) and 77,000 residents (4.5% and 6% of the city total, respectively). The area is accessible through 43 gates, monitored by traffic cameras.

Normally the charge applies to every vehicle entering the city centre on weekdays (Monday to Friday) from 7:30 am to 7:30 pm, except on Thursdays, when it is free after 6 pm. Every vehicle entering the charging zone must pay €5 regardless of its pollution level. Residents of the restricted area must also pay to reach their houses, but they have 40 free accesses per year and a discounted fare of €2.

Access to the area is forbidden for diesel Euro 3 or below, gasoline Euro 0, and private vehicles over 7 m (23 ft) long. Electric vehicles, motorcycles and scooters, public utilities' vehicles, police and emergency vehicles, buses and taxis are exempt from the charge. Hybrid electric and bi-fuel natural gas vehicles (CNG and LPG) were exempt until 1 January 2013. This was later extended until the end of 2016 and later to September 2022.

The program was temporarily suspended between 25 July and 17 September 2012 due to a ruling by the Council of State after protests by owners of car parking facilities in the center of Milan. The congestion charge was suspended from 5 November 2020 due to the COVID-19 pandemic in Italy, to avoid overcrowding on public transport. The charge was reactivated on 24 February 2021, following a dangerous rise of pollution in the city, although with a delayed morning start at 10 am instead of 7:30 am.

The city government announced in July 2023 that the charge will be increased to €7.50 starting between October 2023 and January 2024, in order to match rising public transport fares. It will also be extended to every day of the week, including Saturday and Sunday. Following criticism from the right-wing opposition, the municipality increased the number of free entrances for residents to 50 per year, instead of the previous 40, while not being subject to any new restrictions on weekends. This move has however been criticized by the Greens.

Engine class →	Gasoline							Diesel							Hybrid / bi-fuel	Electric	Scooters
Euro levels →	6	5	4	3	2	1	0	6	5	4	3	2	1	0	Hybrid / bi-fuel	Electric	Scooters
non-residents	€5						banned	€5			banned				free^{1}	free	free
residents^{2}	€2						banned	€2			banned				free^{1}	free	free
commercial	€3						banned	€3			banned				free^{1}	free	NA
public service^{3}	free						banned^{4}	free			banned^{4}				free		NA

1. until September 2022
2. residents have also 40 free accesses per year
3. includes public transport, emergency vehicles, taxis
4. with exceptions

Chauffeur vehicles (Italian: Noleggio con conducente, NCC) with more than nine seats pay higher entrance fees, from €40 to €100, depending on the length of the vehicle.

== Results ==
=== Early results ===
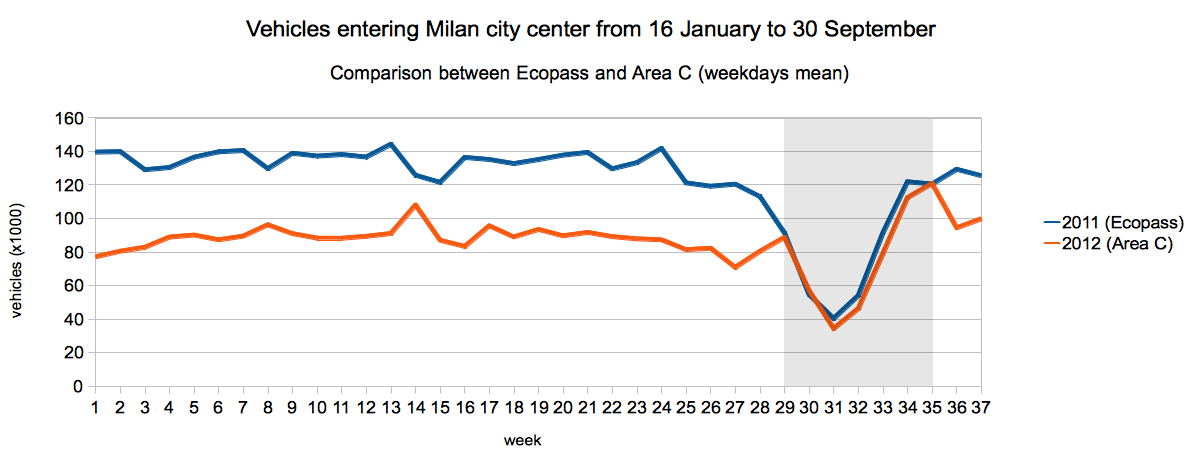
A comparison between vehicles entering Milan city center on average per weekday with Ecopass pollution charge (2011) and Area C congestion charge (2012). Weeks from 16 January to 30 September. The program was suspended during weeks 29 to 35. Data from Comune di Milano.

In the first month 33% fewer cars entered the city center: about 700,000 fewer vehicles during the month or about 40,000 per day. A substantial decrease in traffic congestion in the restricted area was also reported, while traffic outside the area remained unchanged. The congestion charge did not appreciably affect pollution levels, with the exception of the black carbon level, which decreased by about 30% in the ZTL. Data from the first two months showed that traffic also decreased outside the restricted zone: about 6% fewer vehicles outside the ZTL compared to the same months of 2011.

The reduced congestion in the city center resulted in increased average speed for public transport, especially for buses and during peak hours. While there has been an increase of only about 3% in the whole day, the average speed in the morning peak hour (8–9 am) for surface public transport was about 10% higher than pre-Area C levels.

The traffic reduction inside Area C restricted area since its implementation, compared to the same period of the previous year, was 34.3% by 30 April 2012. The total traffic reduction in the Milan area was about 7%. By 30 September 2012, Area C had been operating for a total of 140 days (since 16 January). During this period there was a decrease of 32.8% in vehicles entering the area, compared to 2011.

=== Later results ===
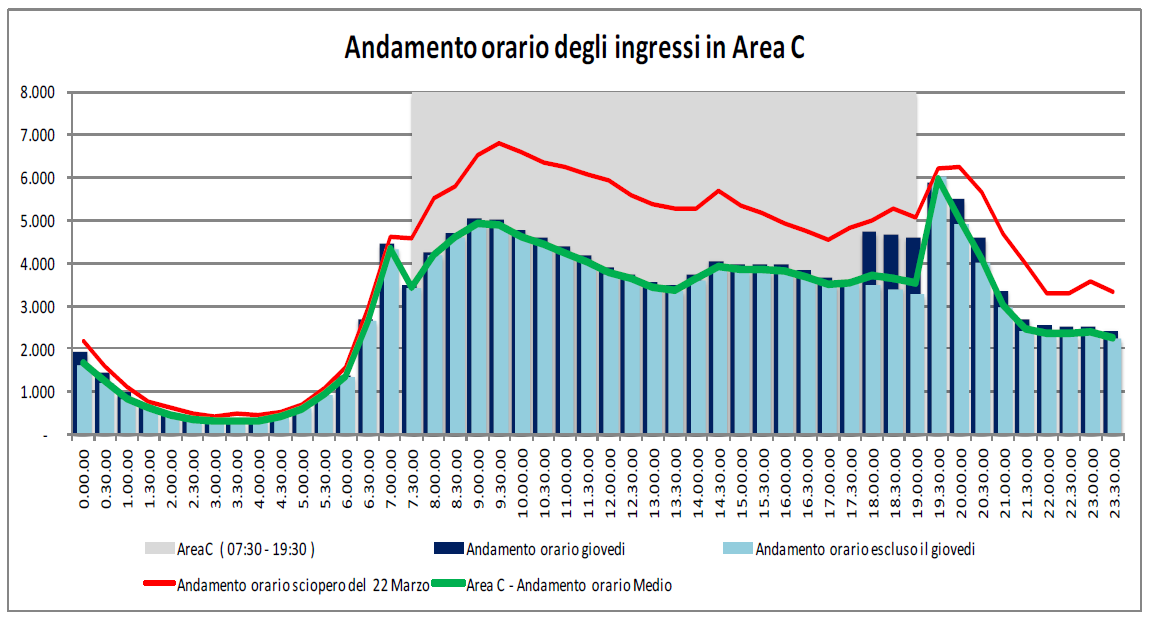
Vehicles entering Milan Area C during the day. in light blue: during average working day except Thursdays; in dark blue: during average Thursday (Area C charge limited to 6 pm); in red: during a working day with Area C not operational (due to a strike); in green: average during Area C (including Thursdays). The gray shading represents the normal period of activation of the congestion charge.

Later results confirmed the trend in decreasing traffic congestion in the city. In the first six months of 2015 the average number of cars entering the restricted area was 28.6% less than in the same period in 2011, during Ecopass. There were 21.6 million entrances to the restricted area in 2014 during the time of operation of Area C. Most drivers enter the restricted area only a few times a year, with about two thirds of cars entering 4 times or less during 2014. Moreover, most residents (71%) living inside the area did not use up all the 40 free permits a year. The trend of decreasing traffic continued into 2021, with a marked reduction in vehicle entries during the operational hours of Area C (7:30 - 19:30). That year, the average daily vehicle entries declined to 81,181 from 131,898 in 2011, representing a significant drop of 38.45%.

Taking into account an estimate for the willingness to pay for PM10 reduction, a study estimated that the welfare gain produced by Area C from air pollution reductions alone is $3 billion per year, mostly resulting from decreased pollution outside of the ZTL area. This is despite the fact that Milan's vehicle fleet is relatively clean compared to other cities in the world.

== Revenues ==
All net earnings from the scheme are invested to promote sustainable mobility and policies to reduce air pollution, including the redevelopment, protection and development of public transport, "soft mobility" (pedestrians, cycling, Zone 30) and systems to rationalize the distribution of goods. In 2012, the program had a total revenue of about €20.3 million and net earnings after expenses of over €13 million. These resources were used to increase service on the Milan Metro, on surface public transportation network and to finance the extension of the BikeMi bike sharing scheme.

== Criticism and controversies ==
Area C, like its predecessor Ecopass, has been highly criticized, especially from right-wing politicians. Demonstrations were held against Area C and an item of hate mail containing a bullet case and text against the congestion charge was sent to the mayor Giuliano Pisapia.

Opponents called for a referendum to abolish Area C, but failed to reach the minimum number of signatures to propose it. Protests by owners of car parking facilities in the city center, who had seen a decrease in profits, led to a ruling by the Council of State which suspended the program on 25 July 2012 for further investigations of its legitimacy. Area C was reactivated on 17 September of that year.

== Area B ==
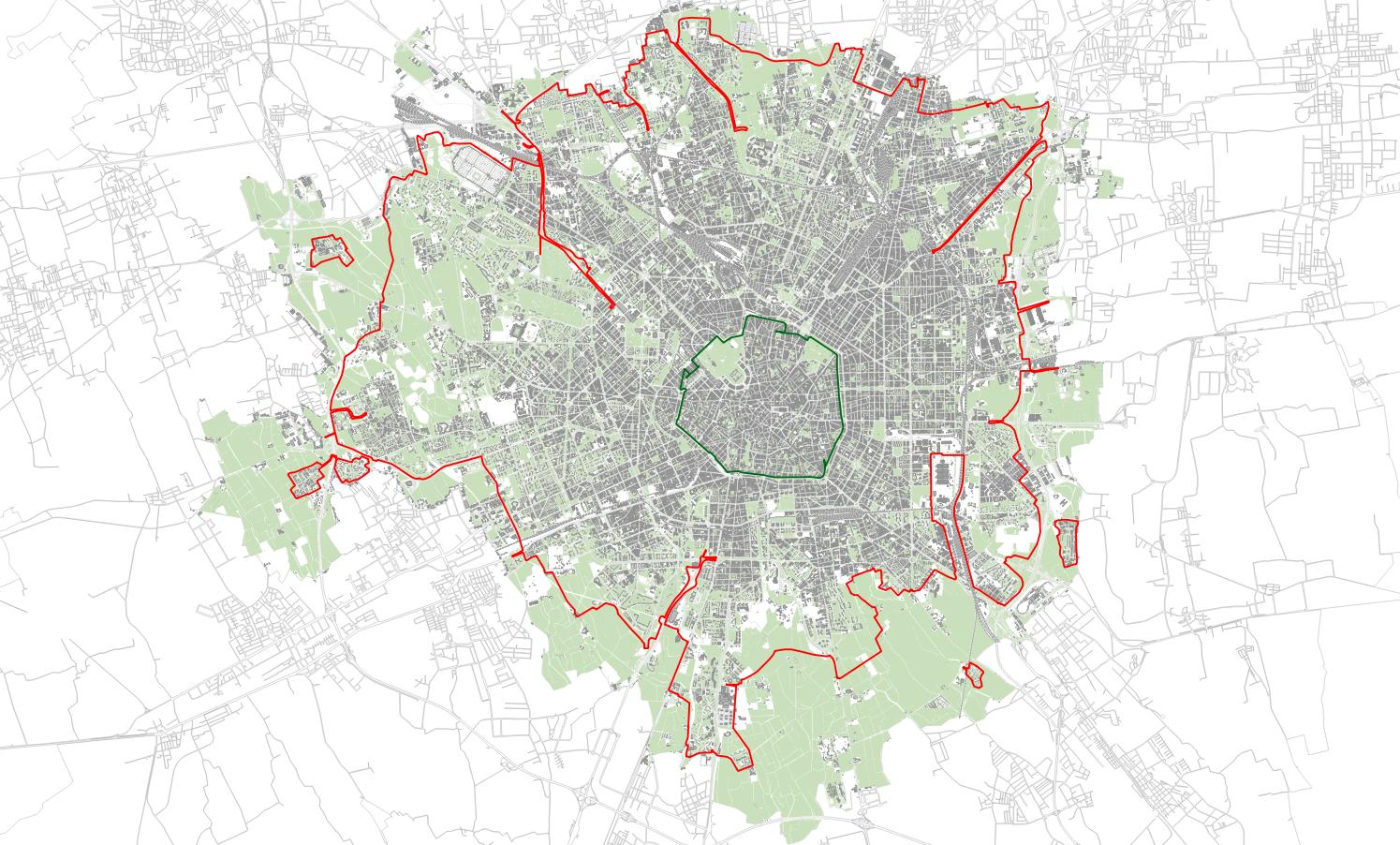
Map of Milan with the boundaries of Area C (green) and Area B (red)

Area B is a larger restricted traffic zone, which came into force on 25 February 2019. It was introduced to restrict access to the city to the most polluting vehicles and to large vehicles.

== See also ==
- Transport in Milan
- Road pricing
- Pigovian tax
- Road space rationing
- Transport economics

Similar congestion pricing schemes

- London congestion charge
- San Francisco congestion pricing
- Electronic Road Pricing (Singapore)
- Stockholm congestion tax
