= San Francisco congestion pricing =

Proposed fee for congested areas

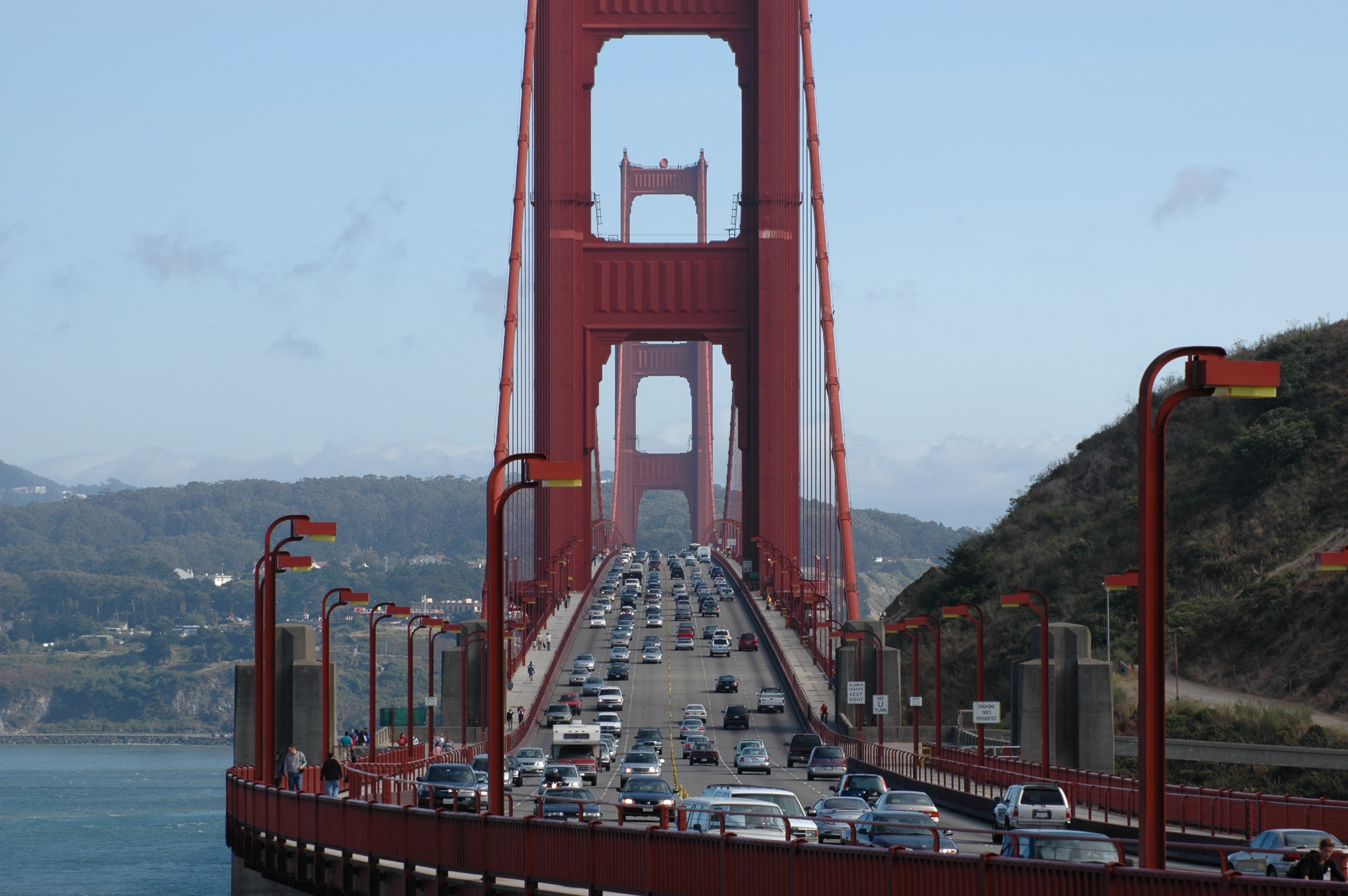
Traffic leaving and entering San Francisco over the Golden Gate Bridge.

San Francisco congestion pricing is a proposed traffic congestion user fee for vehicles traveling into the most congested areas of the city of San Francisco at certain periods of peak demand. The charge would be combined with other traffic reduction projects. The proposed congestion pricing charge is part of a mobility and pricing study being carried out by the San Francisco County Transportation Authority (SFCTA) to reduce congestion at and near central locations and to reduce its associated environmental impacts, including cutting greenhouse gas emissions. The funds raised through the charge will be used for public transit improvement projects, and for pedestrian and bike infrastructure and enhancements. It was considered in Washington, D.C. and San Francisco, prior to the COVID-19 pandemic, and prior to the exodus of businesses from the downtown core of San Francisco.

This initiative was supported by the U.S. Department of Transportation. The initial charging scenarios considered were presented in public meetings held in December 2008 and the final draft proposal, which called for implementation of a six-month to one-year trial in 2015, was discussed by the San Francisco Board of Supervisors (SFBS) in December 2010. The SFBS decided to exclude the Southern Gateway scenario and authorized SFCTA to seek federal financing to continue further planning for the two Northeast Cordon options. Another plan was drafted in 2019 before the COVID-19 pandemic and the exodus of businesses from the downtown core put the congestion pricing proposal on indefinite hold.

If implemented, it may be the second city-based congestion charge scheme in the United States, after congestion pricing in New York City was introduced in 2025. It would be similar to existing schemes that was first introduced in Singapore's Electronic Road Pricing (ERP) system, and the subsequent cities such as London congestion charge, Stockholm congestion tax, and the Milan Area C that were inspired by it. Under a separate initiative congestion pricing tolls were implemented at the San Francisco–Oakland Bay Bridge in July 2010 before that was also suspended indefinitely in 2020 due to COVID-19 pandemic.

== Background ==
The San Francisco County Transportation Authority (SFCTA) began exploring the possibility of introducing congestion pricing in 2004, as part of the Countywide Transportation Plan and motivated by the initial success of the London congestion charge. Since then, several initiatives and plans have been studied. The Bay Area Toll Authority implemented a congestion pricing tolls at the San Francisco–Oakland Bay Bridge in July 2010.

=== Doyle Drive congestion pricing ===
San Francisco's first evaluation of a congestion pricing project was the proposal to implement such a scheme at Doyle Drive, a major approach to the Golden Gate Bridge. In August 2007, the United States Department of Transportation selected five metropolitan areas to initiate congestion pricing demonstration projects under the Urban Partnerships Congestion Initiative, for US$1 billion of federal funding, and the San Francisco Bay Area was awarded with a US$158 million grant for this purpose. Later the city later withdrew its proposal to implement congestion pricing at the Doyle Drive as part of the Urban Partnerships Congestion Initiative, and instead it will be implementing a US$47 million rehabilitation project to relieve traffic congestion near the Golden Gate Bridge.

=== SFpark variable pricing initiative ===
Also as part of the USDoT's Urban Partnerships Congestion Initiative, San Francisco will receive $27 million in federal funds, approved in October 2008, to implement in 2010 an innovative parking plan called SFpark that will use rush hour pricing based on advanced technology through variable pricing according to actual demand. This new system will allow drivers to find available parking spots by checking variable message signs, phoning a 511 service, or via the internet. Users will also be able to pay with their credit, debit or Smart Trip cards, or using their cell phones.

=== Mobility, Access and Pricing Study ===
In 2006, San Francisco authorities began a feasibility study to evaluate how congestion pricing fits to resolve the city's problems. This study was financed with a US$1 million grant from the Federal Highway Administration's Value Pricing Program, with matching funds from local sources. The study is called the Mobility, Access and Pricing Study (MAPS). San Francisco Mayor Gavin Newsom endorsed the concept, and said in early 2008, "a sensible congestion pricing plan is the single greatest step we can take to protect our environment and improve our quality of life."

The first results from the study showed that the pricing scheme could be feasible from an economical, administrative and technical point of view. From the beginning, the mobility study was designed to have input from San Francisco's residents, businesses, travelers, and other stakeholders during the entire process, and the study team has been guided by several advisory committees at different stages of the development of the plan. As public participation is considered crucial, several public workshops are planned to share information and gather input from the public. The results of the two-year study were first presented to SFCTA Board of Supervisors in November 2008, and then the various pricing scenarios considered in the MAPS and other plan details were presented in two public meetings and another one online held in December 2008.

The next step was to present the revised plan to the Board of Supervisors by February 2009 in order to decide if the 11-member board would recommend to continue with the congestion pricing plan. The plan will need approval at the local and state legislative levels, and possibly some non-objection at the federal level. It has not been decided if San Francisco residents will vote to approve the plan's implementation. Final study results were expected by late 2009, and SFCTA staff estimates that if the proposal moves forward in 2009, implementation will still take several years, as at least two to three years would be spent doing the environmental studies required by law.

=== Bay Bridge congestion tolls ===
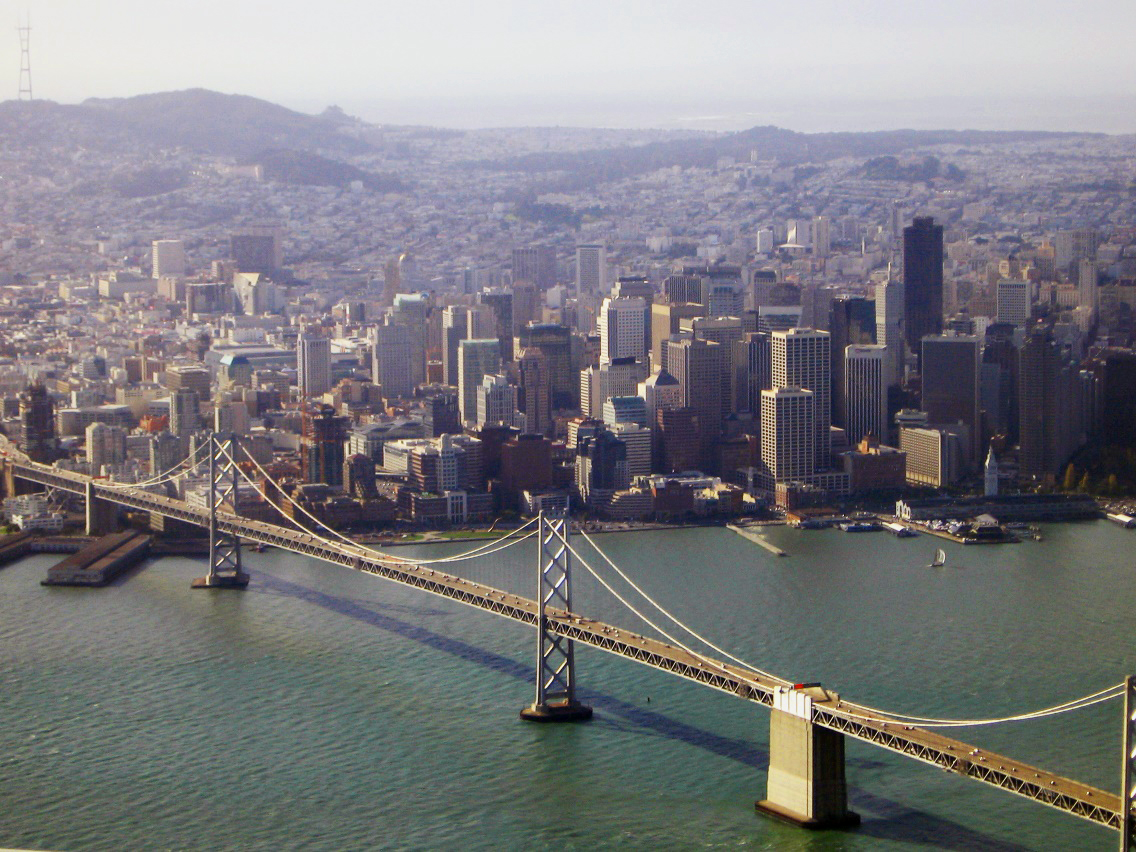
The San Francisco–Oakland Bay Bridge had congestion based-tolling from July 2010 until the policy's suspension in April 2020.

In July 2010 congestion pricing tolls was implemented at the San Francisco–Oakland Bay Bridge. The Bay Bridge congestion pricing scheme charged a US$6 toll from 5 a.m. to 10 a.m. and 3 p.m. to 7 p.m., from Monday through Friday. During weekends cars paid US$5. Carpools before the implementation were initially exempted but then paid US$2.50. The toll remained at the previous toll of US$4 at all other times on weekdays.

The Bay Area Toll Authority reported that by October 2010 fewer users are driving during the peak hours and more vehicles are crossing the Bay Bridge before and after the 5–10 a.m. period in which the congestion toll goes into effect. According to a study contracted to the University of California, Berkeley, commute delays in the first six months have dropped by an average of 15 percent compared with 2009. When the congestion tolls were proposed, the agency expected the scheme to produce a 20 to 30 percent drop in commute traffic. The study also found a decrease in the number of carpools since the first fee for carpools was introduced, with a reduction of 10,800 carpoolers when figures from September 2009 and 2010 are compared. The UC Berkeley study also provides evidence that some people are using BART to get to work in San Francisco instead of paying the higher tolls on the Bay Bridge during rush hour.

In April 2020, in response to the COVID-19 pandemic the Bay Area Toll Authority suspended congestion pricing on the Bay Bridge indefinitely.

== Description of the 2008 proposal ==
Despite the fact the MAPS is still in a stage of further development, several details are still being refined considering the public feedback. The following section presents a summary of the plan as presented to the board of supervisors and discussed in the December 2008 public meetings.

=== Charging area ===
Several scenarios are being considered regarding the best location to collect the congestion tolls. The following are the main alternatives:

- Charging the fee at the city's major entry points: the Bay Bridge, the Golden Gate Bridge, and the freeways to the south, Highway 101 and Interstate 280; or
- Changing the fee over a closed downtown zone, for those entering the Civic Center, downtown and South of Market. This would be a twin triangle area bounded by Washington, Jones, Turk and Harrison streets and Van Ness Avenue.

However, there are concerns among the planner participating in the study that charging at the city's gateways would reduce traffic from outside San Francisco and encouraging more driving among city residents, while the downtown zone might be too small, thus potentially causing problems in adjacent neighborhoods by drivers bypassing the downtown charge zone. So two other scenarios were considered:

- A double-ring, charging both at the major city entrances and at the downtown zone, but with different prices, US$1.50 at the gateways and US$3.00 at downtown.
- A northeast cordon over a larger toll zone that would include downtown and Civic Center, and also Fisherman's Wharf, North Beach and other neighborhoods. The boundaries would include the waterfront on the north and east, Divisadero and Castro streets on the west and 18th Street on the south.

=== Congestion fee ===
The study found that the congestion fees should be between US$0.50 and US$5.00, and concluded that a fee of US$3.00 is the most likely to maximize benefits and minimize impacts. Because social variables are very important, the final amount to be charged will be decided by the mayor and the SFCTA Board of Supervisors. For this reason, the final amount might be different. The congestion fee will be charged to enter, leave or pass through parts of the city on weekdays at each travel peak, between 6:00 and 9:00 a.m. and 4:00 to 7:00 p.m.,

Fees will be charged using the existing FasTrak transponders used for tolling on the Bay Area bridges, and a network of cameras. Drivers will be allowed to pay by telephone, text message, online, mail or at designated stores. Among others, the study considered to exempt driver with disabilities, low-income drivers, and residents within the toll zones. Also discounts for commercial fleets were considered. Taxi drivers will be exempted and rental cars would be charged a fleet rate. Carpoolers probably would not get a discount because they already have toll-free pass through the Bay Area bridges. The study made the assumption that tolls at the Bay Area bridges will remain the same.

=== Financing and costs ===
The estimated cost to implement and operate congestion pricing in San Francisco still is unknown, because it will depend on the program design according to the final alternative selected for implementation and the specific technology used.

The study established as a goal that the system has to be self-funded, meaning that revenues from the congestion pricing fees should pay for the costs of maintenance and operation, and other necessary improvements. The experiences with the London congestion charge and the Stockholm congestion tax have demonstrated that indeed is possible to cover operating costs. The study will explore alternative sources to finance the initial start up costs, including up to US$1 billion recently made available by the federal government for these types of programs.

=== Expected results ===
The study estimated that the congestion charge could raise between US$35 million and US$65 million a year, funds that could be invested in transportation improvements, including increasing capacity on BART, Muni and other Bay Area transit agencies serving San Francisco. The study also found that congestion pricing could reduce peak-hour delays by 30% and reduced car-related greenhouse gases by 15%.

== Description of the 2010 proposal ==
The San Francisco County Transportation Authority (SFCTA) announced in November 2010 the results of the updated feasibility analysis. The final 2010 study refined the Phase 1 alternatives based on further detailed studies, the feedback received during the 2008 public audiences, and the experience of the Stockholm congestion tax, which is considered by SFCTA a more similar case to San Francisco's context than the London congestion charge.

The following section presents a summary of the plan presented for discussion to the San Francisco Board of Supervisors (SFBS) on December 14, 2010. The SFBS decided to exclude the Southern Gateway scenario and authorized SFCTA to seek federal funding to continue further planning for the two Northeast Cordon options and to enter into environmental review. SFCTA will submit a grant for up to $2 million in federal funding for the next phase of the study.

=== Charging area and congestion fee ===
The study proposes three alternatives:

- Northeast Cordon: with a US$3.00 fee during the morning and evening peak commute times from 6:30 to 9:30 a.m. and 3:30 to 6:30 p.m. and charged when coming into or out of the northeast section of San Francisco; bordered by Laguna Street on the west, 18th Street on the south, and the Bay. SFCTA considers that this alternative "provides the greatest congestion reduction in the city's most congested areas, while also delivering substantial additional benefits for transit performance, environmental quality, and sustainable growth".
- Modified Northeast Cordon (Pilot): with a US$6.00 fee charged only when leaving that area during the evening commute, between 3:30 and 6:30 p.m.
- Southern Gateway (Pilot): with a US$3.00 fee in both directions during the morning and evening peaks on the major arteries at the San Francisco/San Mateo County border, at Interstate 280, Highway 101, Skyline Boulevard, Lake Merced Boulevard, San Jose Avenue, Mission Street, Geneva Avenue, Junipero Serra Boulevard and Bayshore Boulevard. A resident discount could be considered for households living with a certain distance of the San Mateo County line. According to the SFCTA report this option weights in geographic equity, as automobile travel from San Francisco's northern and eastern approaches is already subject to bridge tolls, and in the case of the San Francisco–Oakland Bay Bridge, elevated peak-period tolls on weekdays were recently introduced. On the other hand, the land-based border with San Mateo County currently does not have any form of pricing in effect, and the Peninsula and South Bay travel markets are more dominated by automobile travel than the other regional travel corridors to and from the city.

=== Discount policy ===
Based on technical analysis of the impact of discounts on system performance and financial feasibility, the range of discount policies applied in other cities with congestion pricing programs, and extensive discussions with stakeholders and feedback from the public, the proposal recommends a limited set of discounts summarized in the following table:

Summary of Potential Discounts and Fee Categories
Type of Driver/Group	Level of Discount
Mass transit vehicles	Free
Taxicabs	Free
Zone residents	50%
Bridge toll-payers	US$1
Low-income (Lifeline Value)	50%
Disabled motorists	50%
Daily maximum charge	One-way fee x 2
Carpool	None
Low-emission vehicles	None
Commercial vehicles/shuttles	Fleet rate
Rental cars, carsharing vehicles	Fleet rate

=== Trial period ===
The 2010 proposal recommends implementing a trial program with any of the two pilot options, with a duration between six-month to one-year trial in 2015. The objective of this trial is to evaluate public reaction and the effectiveness of the scheme.

=== Expected results ===
The study estimated that the congestion charge could raise between US$60 million and US$80 million a year even when accounting for the 50 percent discount for low-income people and other users. The funds raised through the charge will be used for public transit improvement projects, and for pedestrian and bike infrastructure and enhancements.

The feasibility study concluded that the Northeast Cordon option would reduce vehicle trips to and from the core downtown area (Focus Area) during peak periods by more than 15 percent, and an approximately 10 percent increase in peak-period transit mode share to the Focus Area. The analysis also found that the Northeast Cordon program would result in an annual social benefit of more than US$350 million while the Southern Gateway's benefits would be approximately US$250 million.

== Description of the 2019 proposal ==
In 2010 rideshare apps, specially Uber and Lyft, surged in popularity. They came with the goal of removing person cars from the road, but in the end caused more traffic. In all of the major cities studied in 2019, San Francisco saw the most problems caused by rideshare apps. Uber and Lyft made up 13% of all Vehicle Miles Traveled (VMT) within the four core counties of the Bay Area. Around 15% of intra-San Francisco trips were on rideshare apps. On the average weekday, more than 5,700 Transportation Network Companies (TNC) vehicles were on the street and more than 170,000 trips were made. Only around 54-62% of VMT by rideshare vehicles were with customers in the car, 9-10% of the VMT were generated from approaching a customer, and one third of the time they were solely driving around looking for customers. TNC work by reaching customers in a populated area, seeking out the need, so they were drawn to already congested areas. Uber and Lyft were making the argument against personal vehicles to take the blame off of themselves. They were backed up by the data that 87-99% of VMT are by personal vehicles.

As such private and ride-hailing vehicles continued to increase into downtown, another proposal was drafted in 2019:

- There would be two congestion zones: the downtown area including Chinatown, the Financial District, South of Market, and Tenderloin; and a larger area covering Fisherman's Wharf, North Beach, and Russian Hill to the north, and Mission Bay to the south.
- The base fee would be set at US$6.50, subject to discounts based on income level, during the morning and evening peak commute times from 6:00 to 9:00 a.m. and 3:30 to 6:30 p.m.
- Private and ride-hailing vehicles would also be charged, and likely would pass the fee on to passengers.
- Additional discounts may also be considered, such as those drivers who are disabled, residents living in the pricing zones, and commuters who already paid tolls crossing the Golden Gate or Bay Bridge.

== Other proposals ==
In 2018 Assemblymember Richard Bloom and state senator Scott Wiener proposed a bill to allow congestion pricing tolls in San Francisco and other California cities by removing legal barriers at the state level. Their goal is to target the rise of rideshare vehicles in the city's core, creating unruly traffic. Congestion pricing would require drivers to pay a $3 toll as they enter dense urban areas, targeting congestion. This plan uses two tactics to limit traffic: creating a financial incentive to not enter the crowded areas of the city, and using the toll revenue transit system to improve public transportation. This bill assumes that most people who own cars have money due to the expenses that come with car ownership, and also assumes that most people who use public transit do not have as much money because it is a cheaper option. However, these two assumptions are not always true. Those who drive personal cars are increases the amount of urban sprawl by commuting to and from the city. However, in a 2016 survey by the San Francisco Chamber of Commerce, 72% of surveyed San Franciscans opposed the idea of this bill.

== Concerns and controversy ==
There were several negative reactions, concerns and criticisms as a result of the December 2008 public meetings and online hearing where the preliminary findings of the MAPS (Mobility, Access and Pricing Study) were discussed. One participant questioned the rationale for having to pay to drive on a public street. Others claim that congestion pricing is a regressive tax imposing a greater burden on those without a good option to ride public transit and on low-income commuters. Others considered $6.00 too expensive for a short-duration trip. Zone residents with children and inflexible schedules complained they would be unfairly affected. Another major concern is the lack of reliability and capacity of San Francisco's existing network of transit services, limiting commuters' ability to switch to public transport once the congestion pricing is implemented.

The San Francisco Chamber of Commerce has also expressed concerns because of the burden it might put on retail sales, worsened by the 2008 financial crisis (Great Recession) and COVID-19 recession, driving business away as people will go shop elsewhere in the region. A telephone poll, conducted by the Chamber of Commerce by late January 2009, showed that 61% of the voters opposed the congestion fee for driving downtown.

Staff working on the MAPS study have responded that they are aware of the social consequences and therefore several mitigation measures have been included and are being considered, such as selecting a charge area that is big enough in order to avoid causing problems in adjacent neighborhoods; offering discounts to some drivers such as taxi cabs, low-income and disabled drivers; and charging half-price for residents within the charge zone.

== See also ==
- Congestion pricing
- Congestion pricing in New York City
- Electronic Road Pricing
- London congestion charge
- Milan Area C
- Pareto efficiency
- Pigovian tax
- Road space rationing
- Stockholm congestion tax
- Tragedy of the commons
- Transport economics
- Urban Partnership Agreement
