= Vehicle registration plates of Lithuania =

Republic of Lithuania/Lietuvos Respublika
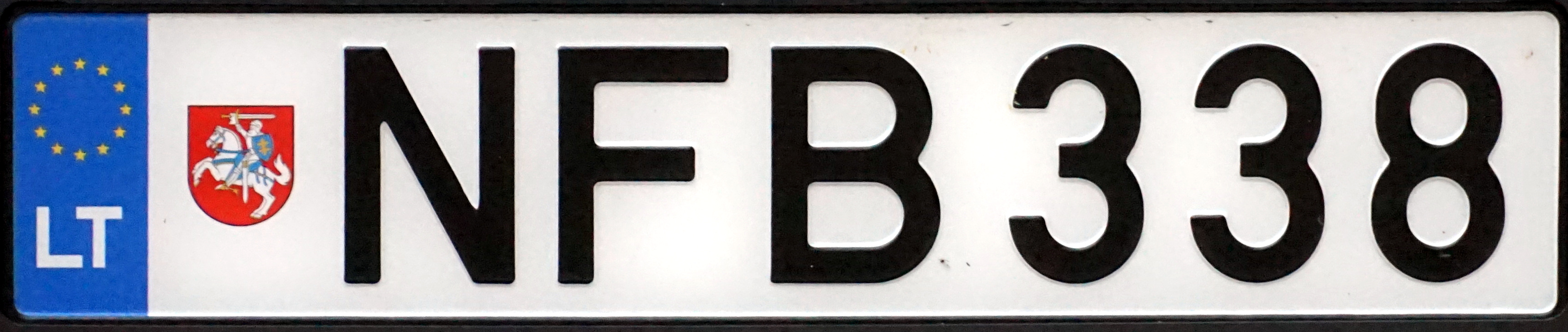
- A current-style Lithuanian registration plate.
- Country: Lithuania
- Country code: LT

Current series
- Size: 520 mm × 110 mm 20.5 in × 4.3 in
- Serial format: ABC123 (for regular plates)
- Colour (front): Black on white
- Colour (rear): Black on white

Availability
- Issued by: Stock Company "Regitra" Municipal authorities

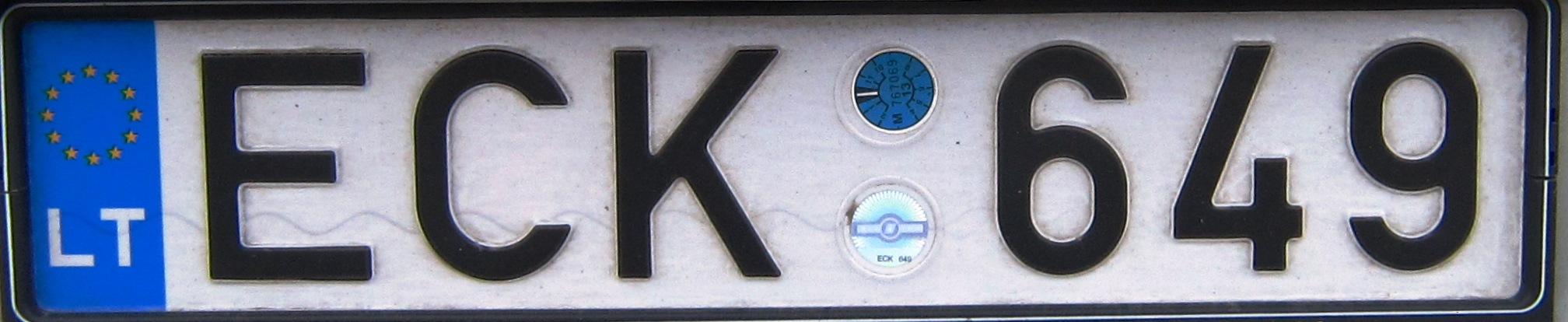
A plate of the type issued between 2004 and 2018

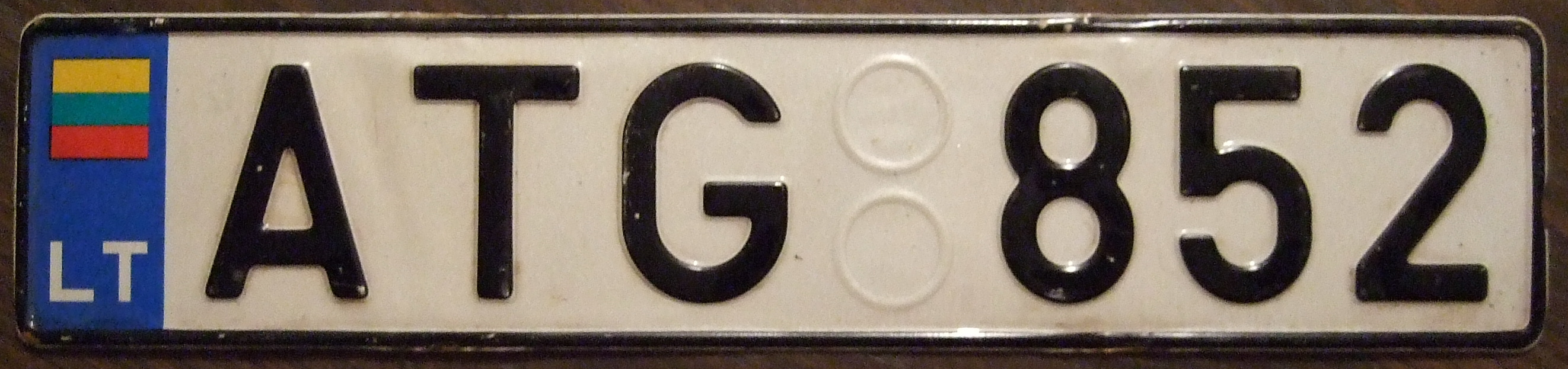
A plate of the type issued between 1993 and 2004

Standard vehicle registration plates in Lithuania bear three letters and three numbers (e.g. ABC 123) in black lettering on a white background without a space between them. The plates are usually of the standard EU dimensions but are also available in the American dimensions for vehicles which cannot accommodate EU-sized plates. All plates issued since 2004 also bear a blue EU identification stripe on their left-hand edge. Those issued between the restoration of Lithuanian independence in 1990 and the country's accession to the European Union in 2004 bore a similar stripe with a small Lithuanian flag in place of the flag of the European Union. No regional code is being used at the moment.

The current design has been issued since October 2023. They bear the coat of arms of Lithuania between the right side of the EU stripe and the number (above the EU stripe for two-line or narrow plates).

== Numbering format ==
The following formats and sizes are used for regular plates:

Vehicle type	Format	Size
Cars, trucks, buses	ABC 123	520x110mm or 300x150mm
Trailers and semi-trailers	AB 123	520x110mm or 300x150mm
Motorcycles	123 AB	250x150mm, 185x210mm or 520x110mm
Mopeds	12 ABC	145x120mm or 520x110mm
Heavy quadricycles	AB 12	250x150mm (without EU symbol)
Electric (or plug-in hybrid) vehicles	EA1234	520x110mm or 300x150mm

Cars, trucks and buses require two plates, while most other types of vehicles only require one plate (but 2 may be issued in some cases)

Since 2016, a separate series for electric vehicles has been introduced. It consists of the letter E, followed by one letter and 4 numbers. The first series was EV, followed by EA, EB, EC, and so on. Initially, they were only available for fully electric vehicles, but since 2018, they are available for plug-in hybrids as well. However, electric cars can use regular plates as well.

For an additional fee, it is possible to reserve a specific combination from the regular series.

It is also possible to order a personalized license plate, with a combination chosen by the owner. The combination must consist of 1-6 characters (5 for motorcycles), one of which must be a number. Any letter of the Latin alphabet may be used (including Q, W and X). The combination must not contain offensive language, the names of countries or international organizations, or match the formats of regular plates.

License plates (both regular and personalized) can be transferred to another vehicle of the same type.

== Area designations ==
Until 2004 the second of the three letters in each registration mark indicated the geographical administrative area in which the vehicle had originally been registered, as follows:

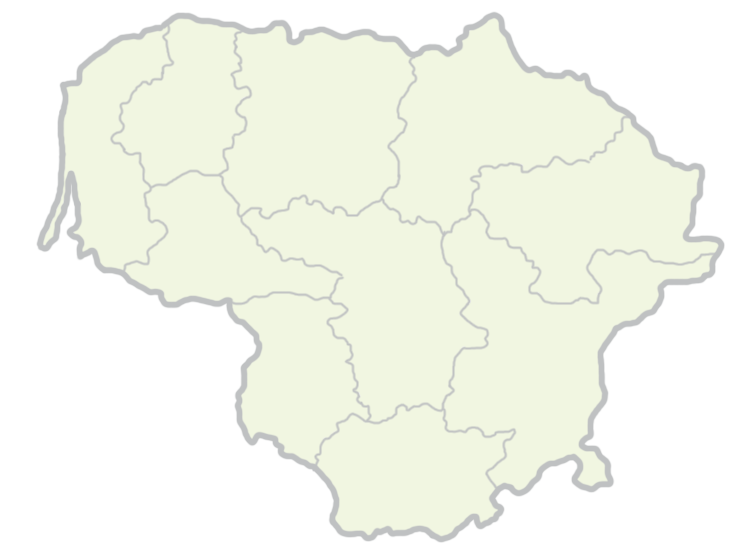

Code	County	Example
A	Alytus County	AAA 123
J	Tauragė County (but code from first letter of Jurbarkas)	AJA 123
K	Kaunas County	AKA 123
L	Klaipėda County	ALA 123
M	Marijampolė County	AMA 123
P	Panevėžys County	APA 123
S	Šiauliai County	ASA 123
T	Telšiai County	ATA 123
U	Utena County	AUA 123
V	Vilnius County	AVA 123

Numbers beginning with LRS and LRV were issued to government officials. Starting in 2004, the area designation was abolished and any letter (except for Q, W and X, which are not used in Lithuanian registration numbers) became admissible as the middle letter.

== Special types ==
=== Temporary ===
Vehicles issued temporary registration in Lithuania are noted by red alphanumeric characters on white background.

==== Vehicles imported to Lithuania or vehicles exported from Lithuania ====
Temporary plate (since 2018)

As of July 2022, these plates are valid for up to 30 days. They can be re-issued to the same vehicle only after it has been issued standard license plates in the meantime. They consist of 4 numbers, followed by 2 letters (1 letter for motorcycles).

==== Vehicles sold by vehicle selling companies or organizations (professional or trade number plates) ====
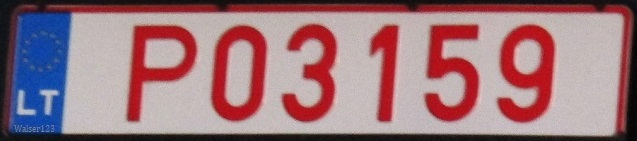
Dealer plate (since 2018)

Plates issued since April 2018 start with the letter P followed by five digits; the plates do not expire, but the authorization to use them must be renewed every 2 years. These plates are only valid in Lithuania. Prior to that, numbers consisted of a letter (P or R) followed by four digits, a space and two more digits, the latter indicating the year of expiration.

=== Diplomatic corps ===
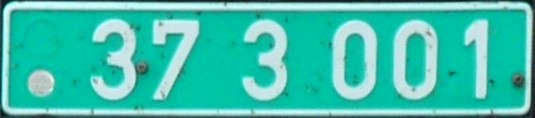
Diplomatic plate (37 - Azerbaijan, 3 - diplomatic personnel)

Reserved and used by diplomatic corps. Plates have a green background and white characters; they do not have blue sidebar on the left side. The numbers are made up of six digits, grouped 01 3 123, with the first two digits denoting the embassy or other diplomatic or consular representation:

Code	Country or Organization
01	Sweden
02	Germany
03	France
04	Latvia
05	Denmark
06	Canada
07	United Kingdom
08	Italy
09	Norway
10	Finland
11	Holy See
12	Turkey
13	Czech Republic
14	United States
15	China
16	Poland
18	Estonia
19	Russia
20	Russia (Consulate General in Klaipėda)
21	Romania
22	Ukraine
23	Belarus
24	Kazakhstan
25	Georgia
26	Japan
28	Belgium (Flanders Investment and Trade Division)
29	Netherlands
30	Hungary
31	Spain
32	Sovereign Military Order of Malta
33	Greece
34	Ireland
36	Moldova
37	Azerbaijan
39	Armenia
40	Croatia
41	Israel
42	Nigeria
43	India
60	Taiwan (Representative Office)
80	Nordic Council of Ministers
81	World Bank
82	European Bank for Reconstruction and Development
83	World Health Organization
84	United Nations Development Programme
85	International Organization for Migration
86	(European Union) European Commission
87	United Nations
88	European Institute for Gender Equality
89	NATO Energy Security Centre of Excellence
90	NATO Force Integration Unit in Lithuania
91	European Investment Bank

The third digit indicates the status of the vehicle:

1	Chief of mission
2	Embassy vehicle
3	Diplomatic personnel
4	Administrative and technical personnel

The remaining 3 digits (2 for motorcycles) are the serial number of the vehicle.

=== Taxicabs ===
Taxi registration plate of Lithuania, issued before April 2018

Taxicabs have plates with white background and black text. The first letter is "T" (corresponds to the first letter of the word "taksi" in Lithuanian) and is followed by five numbers.

Before the 3rd of April, 2018, taxi plates had a yellow background and black text, with the same number scheme. These plates continued to be valid and registration centers issued these plates beyond April 3, 2018, until stocks were exhausted.

=== Military ===
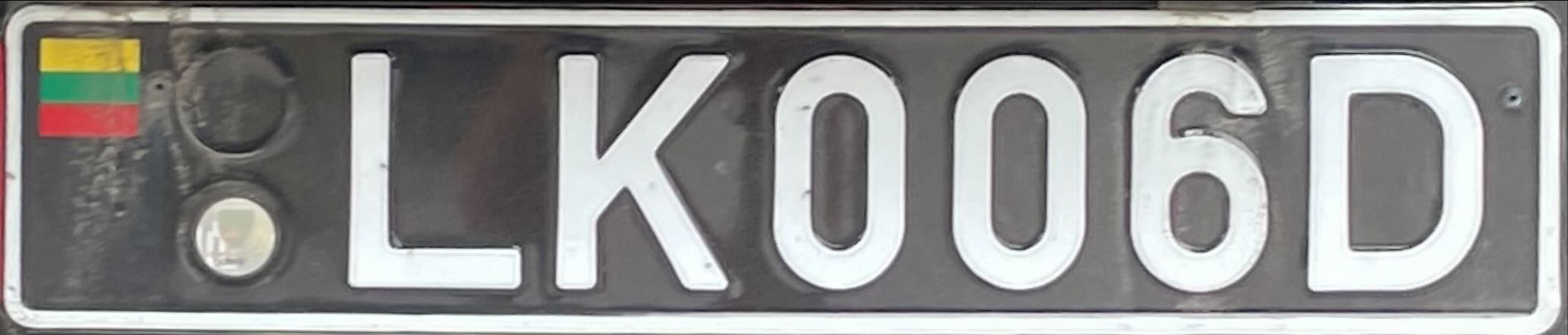
Military license plate

Since November 2008, vehicles of the Lithuanian Armed Forces display a black license plate with white text consisting of the letters "LK", three digits, and one letter. Instead of the standard European blue band, the Lithuanian flag is featured on the left.

=== Vintage cars ===
H02401

Plates for vintage cars have been issued since July 1, 2014. Originally these plates had white characters on a brown background, which was changed to black on white as of April 3, 2018. They start with the letter H, followed by five digits (four for motorcycles).

=== Agricultural and motorized equipment ===
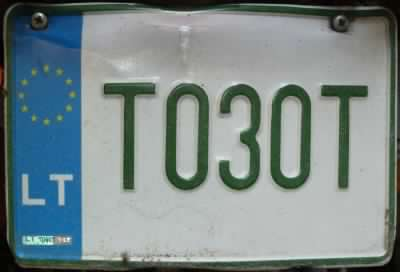
Agricultural and motorized equipment plate (small size)

Tractors, agricultural and motorized equipment, trailers for them, and some types of ATVs use plates with green characters on a white background. These plates are administered by municipal authorities. The registration number consists of one letter, 3 or 4 numbers and another letter.

== Technical check sticker ==
Until 2018, the registration plate had a special spot to attach a sticker certifying the compulsory periodic technical inspection to check for compliance with safety/emissions standards. On regular plates, it was between the letters and numbers or next to the blue band. On motorcycle, square or US-sized plates, it was below the blue band or registration number. Plates made after 2018 no longer have a spot for the sticker. The sticker is no longer compulsory from June 2016.
