= Congestion pricing =

System of charging users of public goods

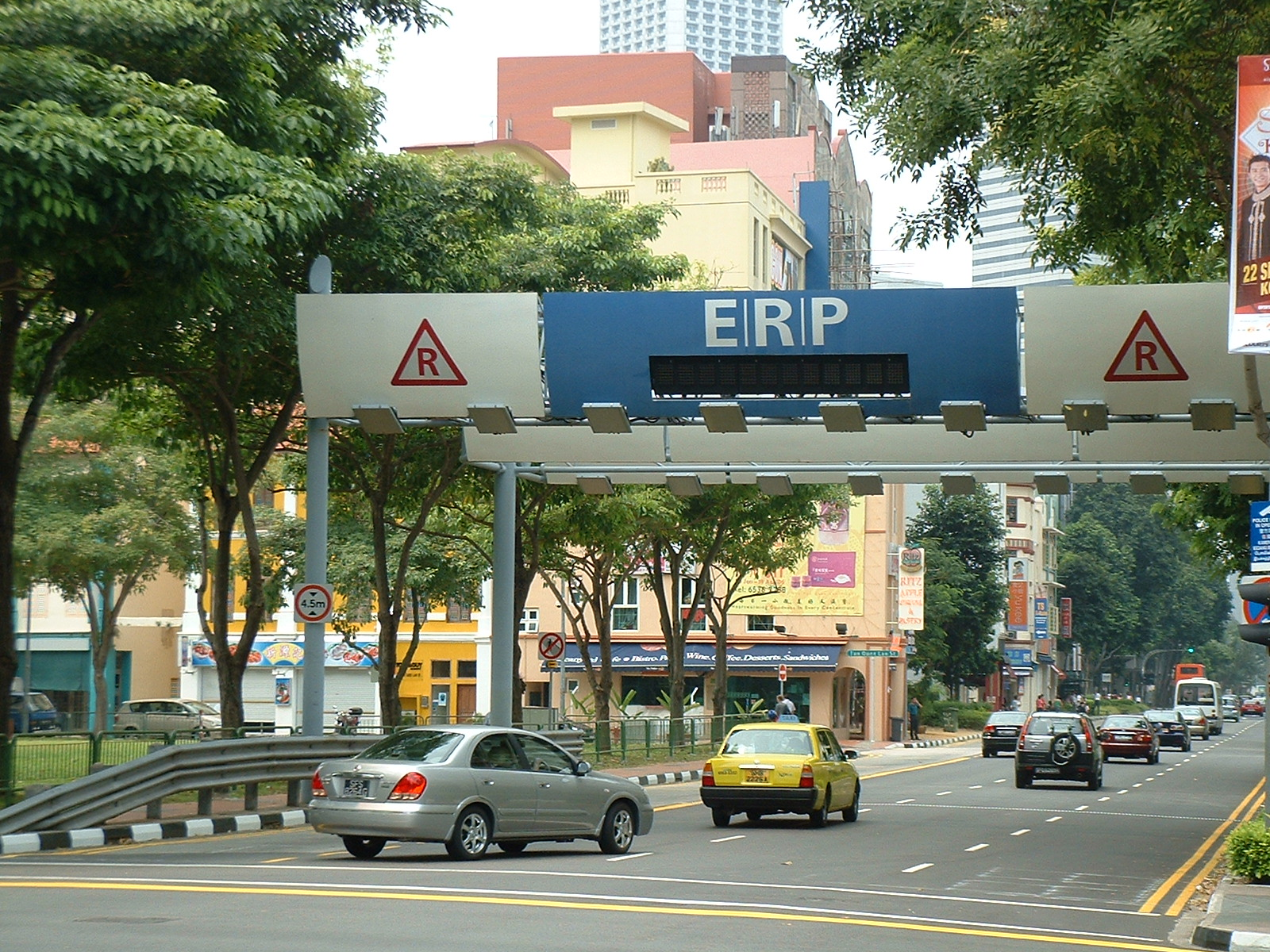
Electronic Road Pricing gantry in Singapore, the first place in the world to implement an urban cordon area congestion pricing scheme

Congestion pricing or congestion charges is a system of charging users of public goods that are subject to congestion through excess demand, such as through higher peak charges for use of bus services, electricity, metros, railways, telephones, and road pricing to reduce traffic congestion; airlines and shipping companies may be charged higher fees for slots at airports and through canals at busy times. This pricing strategy regulates demand, making it possible to manage congestion without increasing supply.

According to the economic theory behind congestion pricing, the objective of this policy is to use the price mechanism to cover the social cost of an activity where users otherwise do not pay for the negative externalities they create (such as driving in a congested area during peak demand). By setting a price on an over-consumed product, congestion pricing encourages the redistribution of the demand in space or in time, leading to more efficient outcomes.

Singapore was the first country to introduce congestion pricing on its urban roads in 1975, and was refined in 1998. Since then, it has been implemented in cities including London, Durham, England, Stockholm, Gothenburg, Milan, and New York City. In the United States, it was also considered in Washington, D.C., San Francisco, and Boston prior to the COVID-19 pandemic. Outside of the United States, congestion pricing programs have been piloted or proposed in Bangkok, Cambridge, Edinburgh, Switzerland, and Hong Kong in the 1980s and since 2018.

Greater awareness of the harms of pollution and emissions of greenhouse gases in the context of climate change has recently created greater interest in congestion pricing. Implementation of congestion pricing has reduced traffic congestion in urban areas, reduced pollution, reduced asthma, and increased home values, but has also sparked criticism and political discontent.

There is a consensus among economists that congestion pricing in crowded transportation networks, and subsequent use of the proceeds to lower other taxes, makes citizens on average better off. Economists disagree over how to set tolls, how to cover common costs, what to do with any excess revenues, whether and how "losers" from tolling previously free roads should be compensated, and whether to privatize highways.

== Description ==
Congestion pricing is a concept from market economics regarding the use of pricing mechanisms to charge the users of public goods for the negative externalities generated by the peak demand in excess of available supply. Its economic rationale is that, at a price of zero, demand exceeds supply, causing a shortage, and that the shortage should be corrected by charging the equilibrium price rather than shifting it down by increasing the supply. Usually this means increasing prices during certain periods of time or at the places where congestion occurs; or introducing a new usage tax or charge when peak demand exceeds available supply in the case of a tax-funded public good provided free at the point of usage.

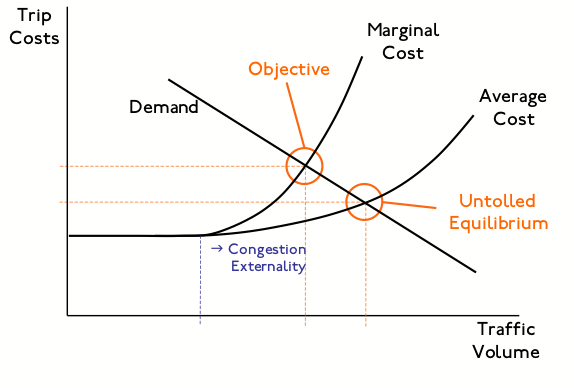
Economic rationale for moving from untolled equilibrium to congestion pricing equilibrium

According to the economic theory behind congestion pricing, the objective of this policy is the use of the price mechanism to make users more aware of the costs that they impose upon one another when consuming during the peak demand, and that they should pay for the additional congestion they create, thus encouraging the redistribution of the demand in space or in time, or shifting it to the consumption of a substitute public good; for example, switching from private transport to public transport.

This pricing mechanism has been used in several public utilities and public services for setting higher prices during congested periods, as a means to better manage the demand for the service, and whether to avoid expensive new investments just to satisfy peak demand, or because it is not economically or financially feasible to provide additional capacity to the service. Congestion pricing has been widely used by telephone and electric utilities, metros, railways and autobus services, and has been proposed for charging internet access. It also has been extensively studied and advocated by mainstream transport economists for ports, waterways, airports and road pricing, though actual implementation is rather limited due to the controversial issues subject to debate regarding this policy, particularly for urban roads, such as undesirable distribution effects, the disposition of the revenues raised, and the social and political acceptability of the congestion charge.

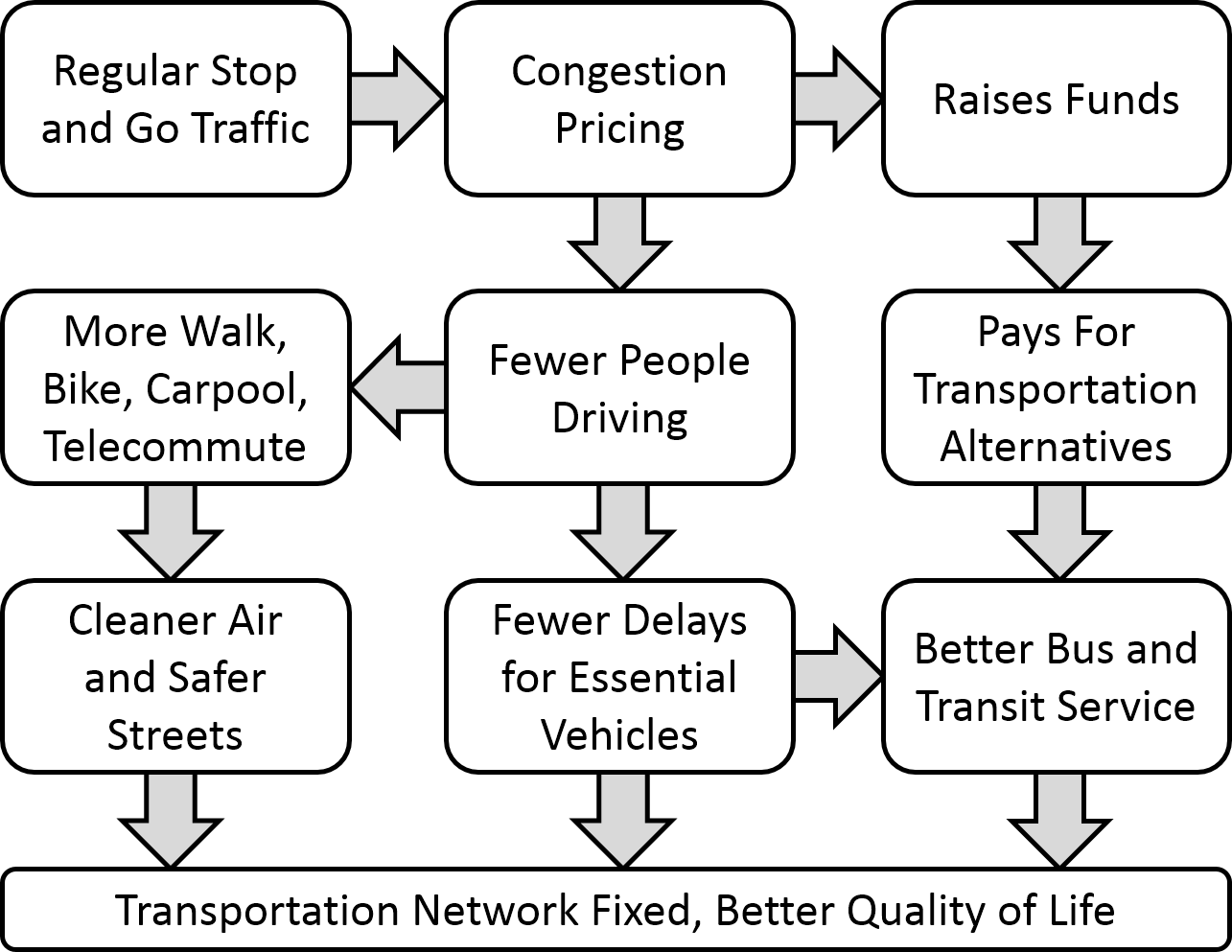
An introductory flowchart describing congestion pricing

Congestion pricing is one of a number of alternative demand side (as opposed to supply side) strategies offered by economists to address traffic congestion. Congestion is considered a negative externality by economists. An externality occurs when a transaction causes costs or benefits to a third party, often, although not necessarily, from the use of a public good: for example, if manufacturing or transportation cause air pollution imposing costs on others when making use of public air. Congestion pricing is an efficiency pricing strategy that requires the users to pay more for that public good, thus increasing the welfare gain or net benefit for society.

Nobel-laureate William Vickrey is considered by some to be the father of congestion pricing, as he first proposed adding a distance- or time-based fare system for the New York City Subway in 1952. In the road transportation arena these theories were extended by Maurice Allais, Gabriel Roth who was instrumental in the first designs and upon whose World Bank recommendation the first system was put in place in Singapore. Also, it was considered by the Smeed Report, published by the British Ministry of Transport in 1964, but its recommendations were rejected by successive British governments.

The transport economics rationale for implementing congestion pricing on roads, described as "one policy response to the problem of congestion", was summarized in testimony to the United States Congress Joint Economic Committee in 2003: "congestion is considered to arise from the mispricing of a good; namely, highway capacity at a specific place and time. The quantity supplied (measured in lane-miles) is less than the quantity demanded at what is essentially a price of zero. If a good or service is provided free of charge, people tend to demand more of it—and use it more wastefully—than they would if they had to pay a price that reflected its cost. Hence, congestion pricing is premised on a basic economic concept: charge a price in order to allocate a scarce resource to its most valuable use, as evidenced by users' willingness to pay for the resource".

As applied to traffic, there are technically two types of congestion pricing. Cordon or area pricing defines the boundaries of an affected area -- typically an area of dense travel demand such as a city center -- and charges for personal vehicles to cross its boundaries. Lane or facility pricing charges for access to a single facility, such as a segment of road or bridge. In practice, the term "congestion pricing" is often used to refer to cordon pricing but not facility pricing, as this is a newer idea.

== Roads ==
Practical implementations of road congestion pricing are found almost exclusively in urban areas, because traffic congestion is common in and around city centers. Congestion pricing can be fixed (the same at all times of day and days of the week), variable (set in advance to be higher at typically high-traffic times), or dynamic (varying according to actual conditions).

As congestion pricing has been increasing worldwide, the schemes implemented have been classified into four different types: cordon area around a city center; area wide congestion pricing; city center toll ring; and corridor or single facility congestion pricing.

=== Cordon area and area wide ===
Cordon area congestion pricing is a fee or tax paid by users to enter a restricted area, usually within a city center, as part of a demand management strategy to relieve traffic congestion within that area. The economic rationale for this pricing scheme is based on the externalities or social costs of road transport, such as air pollution, noise, traffic accidents, environmental and urban deterioration, and the extra costs and delays imposed by traffic congestion upon other drivers when additional users enter a congested road.

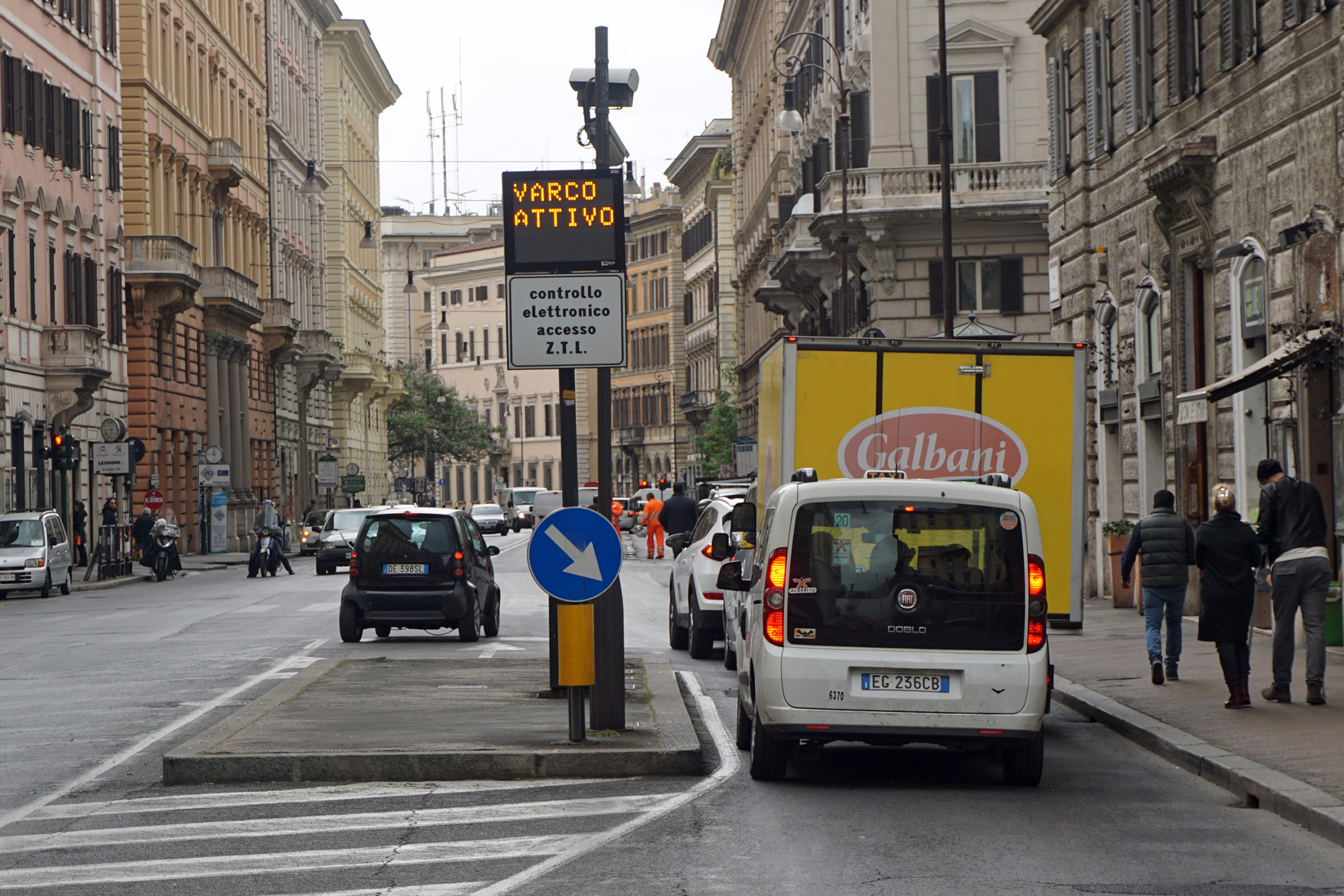
Rome's Traffic Limited Zone (ZTL) entry control point with automatic surveillance

The first implementation of such a scheme was Singapore Area Licensing Scheme in 1975, together with a comprehensive package of road pricing measures, stringent car ownership rules and improvements in mass transit. Thanks to technological advances in electronic toll collection, electronic detection, and video surveillance technology, collecting congestion fees has become easier. Singapore upgraded its system in 1998, and similar pricing schemes were implemented in Rome in 2001, London in 2003 with extensions in 2007; Stockholm in 2006, as a seven-month trial, and then on a permanent basis. In January 2008 Milan began a one-year trial program called Ecopass, charging low emission standard vehicles and exempting cleaner and alternative fuel vehicles. The Ecopass program was extended until December 31, 2011, and on January 16, 2012, was replaced by Area C, a trial program that converted the scheme from a pollution-charge to a congestion charge. The Gothenburg congestion tax was implemented in January 2013 and it was modeled after the Stockholm scheme.

Singapore and Stockholm charge a congestion fee every time a user crosses the cordon area, while London charges a daily fee for any vehicle driving on a public road within the congestion charge zone, regardless of how many times the user crosses the cordon. Stockholm has put a cap on the maximum daily tax, while in Singapore the charge is based on a pay-as-you-use principle, and rates are set based on traffic conditions at the pricing points, and reviewed on a quarterly basis. Through this policy, the Land Transport Authority (LTA) reports that the electronic road pricing "has been effective in maintaining an optimal speed range of 45 to 65 km/h for expressways and 20 to 30 km/h for arterial roads".

==== Singapore ====
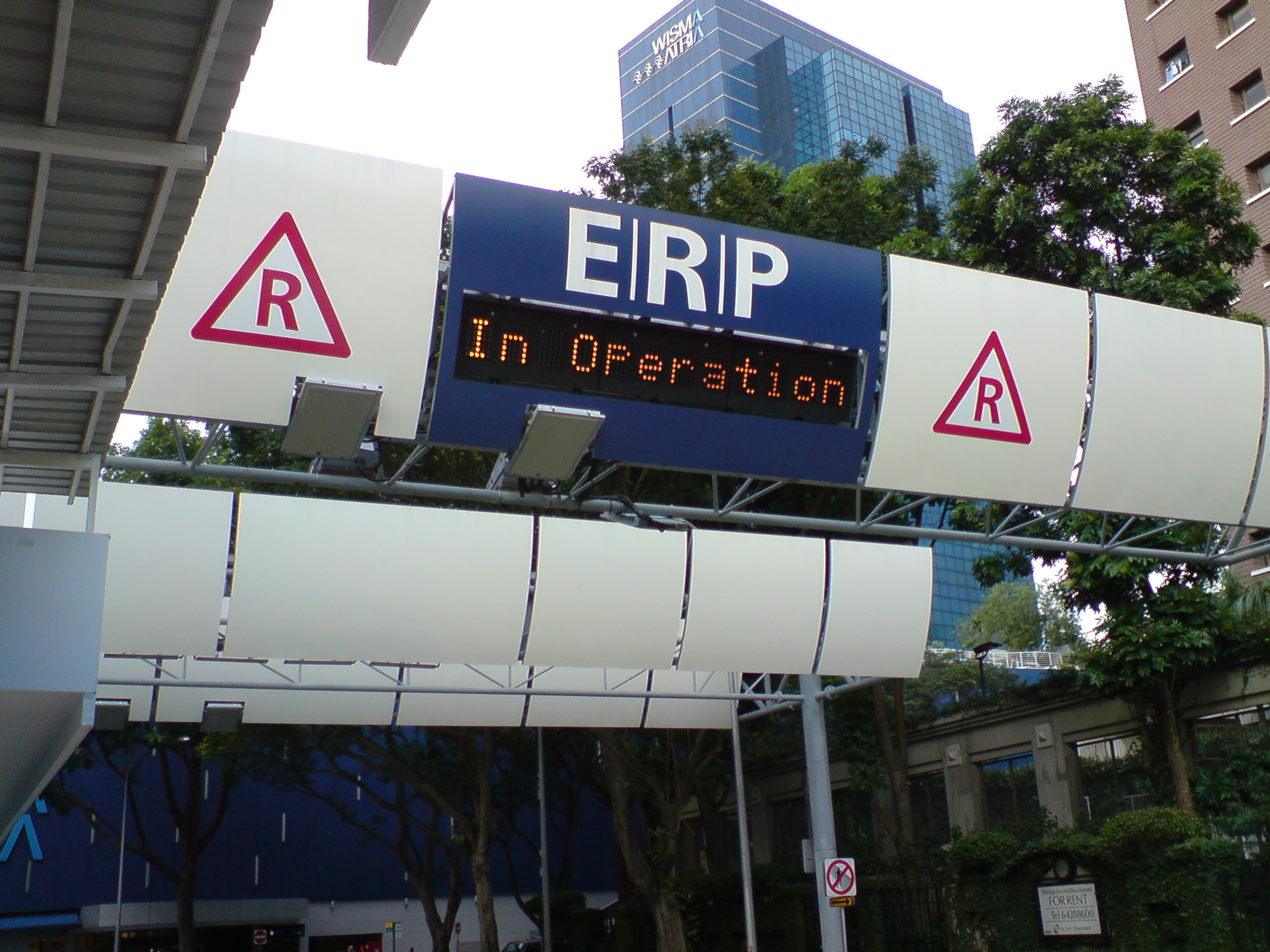
Automatic tolling gantry of Singapore's Electronic Road Pricing scheme

In an effort to improve the pricing mechanism, and, to introduce real-time variable pricing, Singapore's LTA together with IBM, ran a pilot from December 2006 to April 2007, with a traffic estimation and prediction tool (TrEPS), which uses historical traffic data and real-time feeds with flow conditions from several sources, in order to predict the levels of congestion up to an hour in advance. By accurately estimating prevailing and emerging traffic conditions, this technology is expected to allow variable pricing, together with improved overall traffic management, including the provision of information in advance to alert drivers about conditions ahead, and the prices being charged at that moment.

In 2021 the Land Transport Authority required that all motorists replace their old Electronic Road Pricing readers with new Global Navigation Satellite System based readers. This will allow the large gantries to be replaced with smaller gantries, and the pricing will remain cordon based, even though the potential now exists to price based on distance traveled.

==== London ====
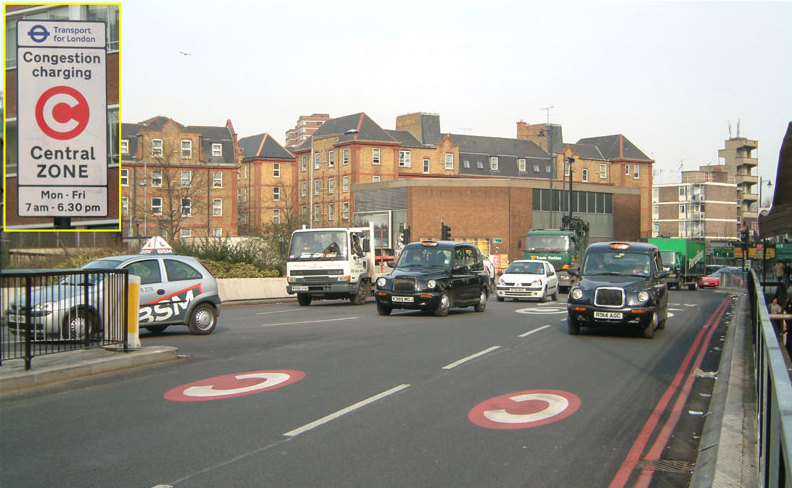
At Old Street, street markings and a sign (inset) with the white-on-red C alert drivers to the congestion charge in London.

A proposal by former Mayor of London Ken Livingstone would have resulted in a new pricing structure based on potential CO_{2} emission rates by October 2008. Livingstone's successor as Mayor of London, Boris Johnson, announced in July 2008 that the new CO_{2} charging structure will no longer be implemented. Johnson decided to remove the 2007 Western Extension from the congestion charging zone beginning on January 4, 2011, to increase the basic charge to £10, and also to introduce an automated payment system called Congestion Charging Auto Pay (CC Auto Pay), which will charge vehicles based on the number of charging days a vehicle travels within the charging zone each month, and the drivers of these vehicles will pay a reduced £9 daily charge. In November 2012 Transport for London (TfL) presented a proposal to abolish the Greener Vehicle Discount, and the Ultra Low Emission Discount (ULED) went into effect on 1 July 2013, limiting the free access to the congestion charge zone to selected vehicles. There has been criticism because during the first ten years since the scheme was implemented, gross revenue reached about £2.6 billion, but only £1.2 billion has been invested, meaning that 54% of gross revenues have been spent in operating the system and administrative expenses.

A new toxicity charge, known as T-charge was introduced from 23 October 2017. Older and more polluting cars and vans that do not meet Euro 4 standards will have to pay an extra £10 charge within the Congestion Charge Zone (CCZ). On 8 April 2019, the T-charge was expanded into the Ultra Low Emission Zone (ULEZ).

==== Milan ====
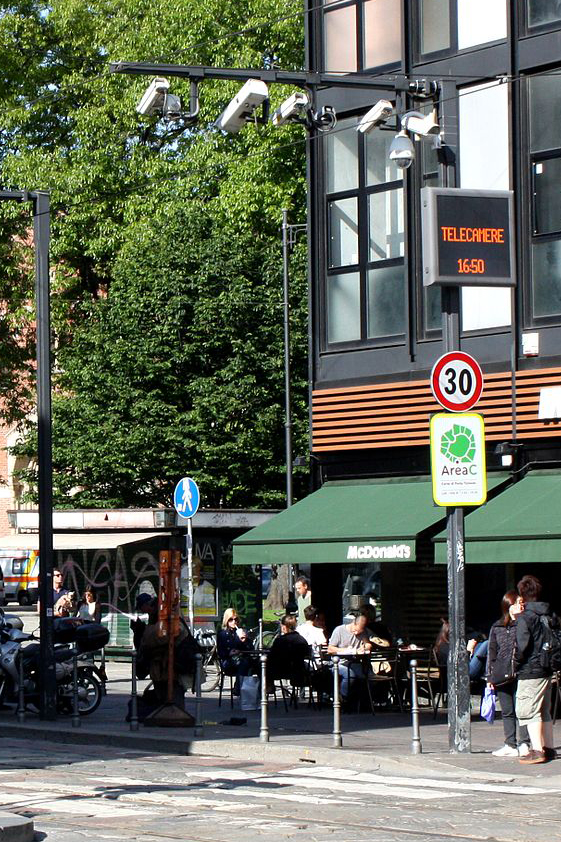
Entrance to Milan Area C

The Ecopass pollution charge ended on December 31, 2011, and was replaced by the Area C scheme, which went into effect on January 16, 2012, initially as an 18-month pilot program. The Area C scheme is a conventional congestion pricing scheme and is based on the same Ecopass geographic area. Vehicles entering the charging zone incur a charge of €5 regardless of their pollution level. However, residents inside the area have 40 free entries per year and then a discounted charge of €2. Electric vehicles, public utility vehicles, police and emergency vehicles, buses and taxis are exempted from the charge. Hybrid electric and bi-fuel natural gas vehicles (CNG and LPG) were exempted until January 1, 2013, though exemption has been postponed until December 31, 2016.

The scheme was made permanent in March 2013. All net earnings from Area C are invested to promote sustainable mobility and policies to reduce air pollution, including the redevelopment, protection and development of public transport, "soft mobility" (pedestrians, cycling, Zone 30) and systems to rationalize the distribution of goods.

==== Stockholm ====
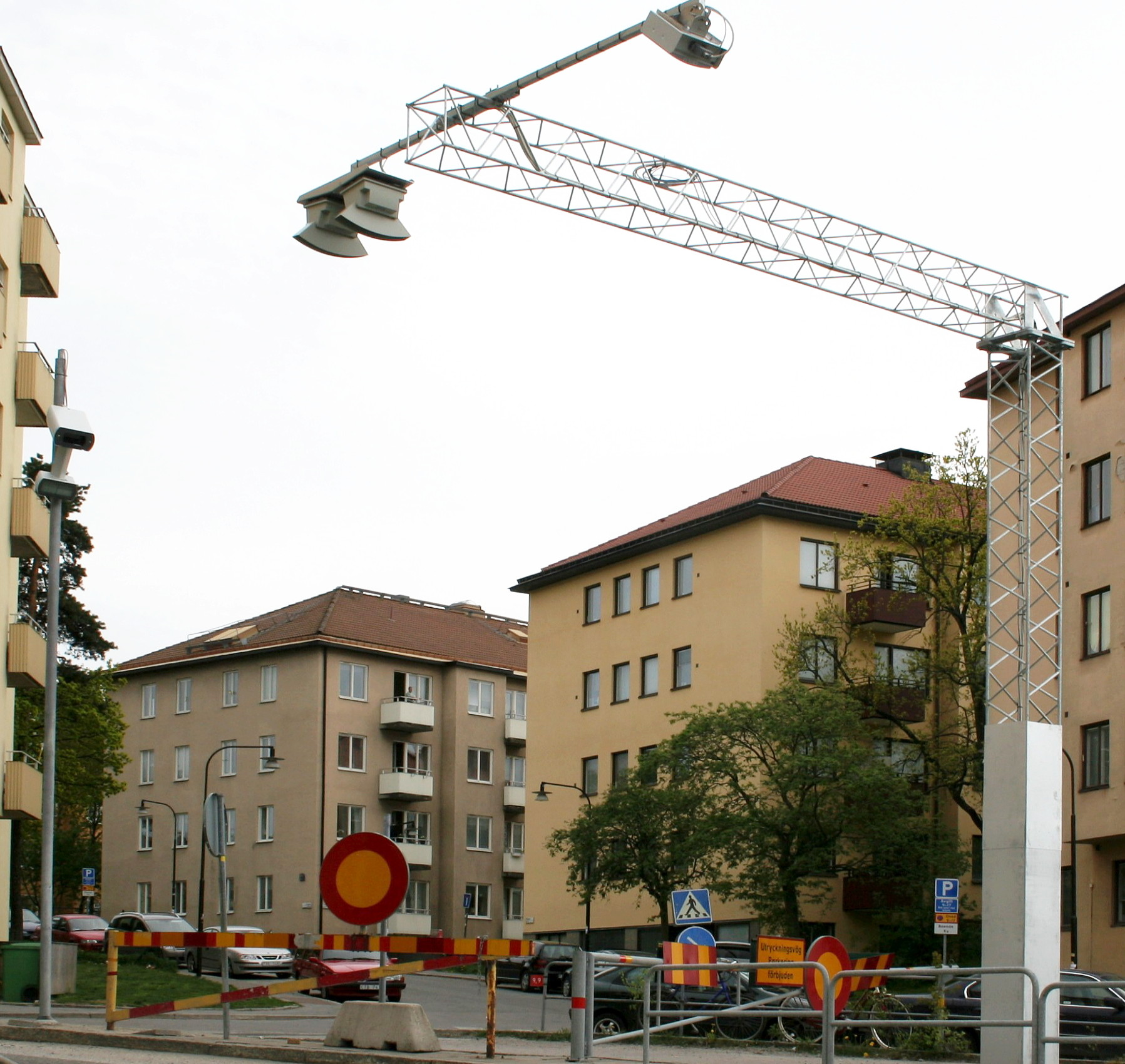
Automatic detection system at Stockholm's first electronic gantry at Lilla Essingen

On 1 January 2016, congestion taxes were increased in the inner-city parts of Stockholm, and also the congestion tax was introduced on Essingeleden motorway. This was the first increase of the tax since it was introduced permanently in 2007.

The congestion tax is being introduced at the access and exit ramps of two interchanges on Essingeleden in order to reduce traffic jams in peak periods, and with shorter traffic jams on Essingeleden, the surrounding roads are expected to have shorter tailbacks. The transport agencies involved expected to reduce traffic on Essingeleden by some 10% in peak hours. One week after the tax began to be charged, traffic on the motorway had decreased by 22% compared to a normal day in mid-December.

The tax increase was implemented not only to improve accessibility and the environment, but also to help develop the infrastructure. The additional funds will contribute to finance the extension of the Stockholm Metro. As the Stockholm congestion tax varies by time of the day, the highest increase took place at the two busiest rush hour periods, 7:30 to 8:29, and 16:00 to 17:29, from SEK 20 to SEK 30. The objective was to steer the traffic towards other times of the day and public transport, and in this way reduce congestion in the Inner City area. Also the maximum amount levied was raised to SEK 105 per day and vehicle.

==== Norway ====
Several cities in Norway have tolled entrances to the more central urban areas, the first being Bergen in 1986. Starting with Trondheim in 2010, later in Kristiansand, Bergen and Oslo, time differing fees were introduced, so that rush hours (in Oslo 06.30 – 09.00 and 15.00 – 17.00) cost more. The price is (in 2020) typically NOK 28 (€2.37) per passage, but to enter Oslo to the inner city and leave means passing five stations which costs NOK 126 (€10,66).

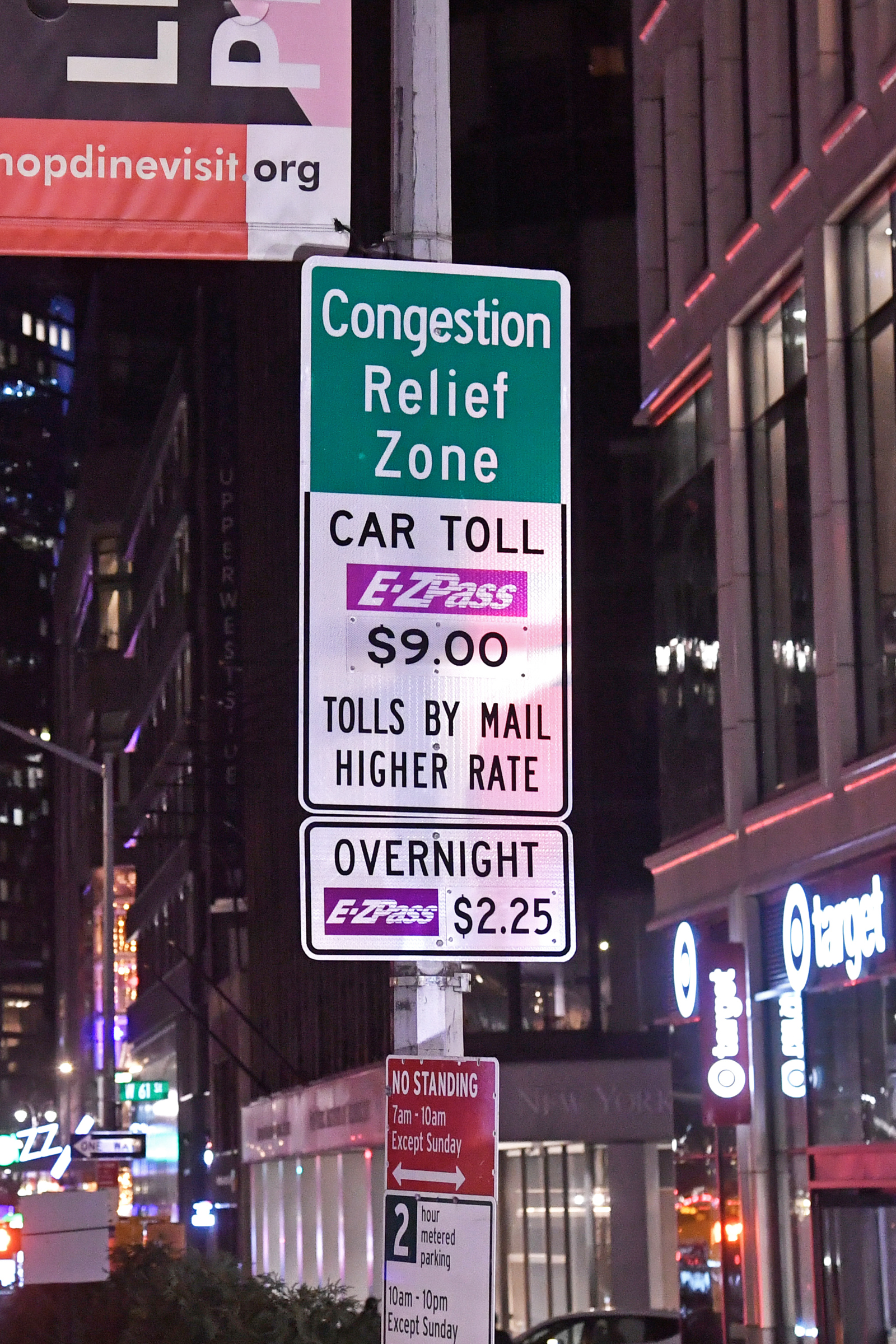
Congestion Relief Zone sign in Manhattan

==== New York City ====
New York City implemented congestion pricing in 2025, becoming the first city in the United States to do so. Most vehicles entering the central business district of Manhattan south of 61st Street are charged a fee that varies by time of day. The tolls are a source of revenue for the Metropolitan Transportation Authority (MTA), which operates the city's public transit.

In 2017, New York Governor Andrew Cuomo declared a state of emergency for the MTA. As a solution, Cuomo proposed using congestion pricing as a means of funding the agency. Later that year, a commission to investigate the feasibility of congestion pricing found that such a scheme could benefit New York City. State lawmakers approved a congestion pricing plan in March 2019. The Federal Highway Administration gave its final approval on June 26, 2023, allowing the MTA to begin setting toll rates for the proposed congestion zone. Implementation was scheduled for 30 June 2024, but in an announcement by Governor Kathy Hochul on 5 June 2024, the plan was indefinitely postponed. In November 2024, Hochul announced an intent for the toll to go forward with a planned implementation on 5 January 2025, at a reduced rate.

==== Old town centres ====
Around Europe several relatively small cities, such as Durham, England; Znojmo, Czech Republic; Riga, Latvia; and Valletta, Malta, have implemented congestion pricing to reduce traffic crowding, parking problems and pollution, particularly during the peak tourism season.

Durham introduced charges in October 2002, reducing vehicle traffic by 85% after a year; prior to this 3,000 daily vehicles had shared the streets with 17,000 pedestrians.

Valletta has reduced daily vehicles entering the city from 10,000 to 7,900; making 400 readily available parking places in the center. There has been a 60% drop in car stays by non-residents of more than eight hours, but there has been a marked increase of 34% in non-residential cars visiting the city for an hour or less.

==== Rejected proposals ====
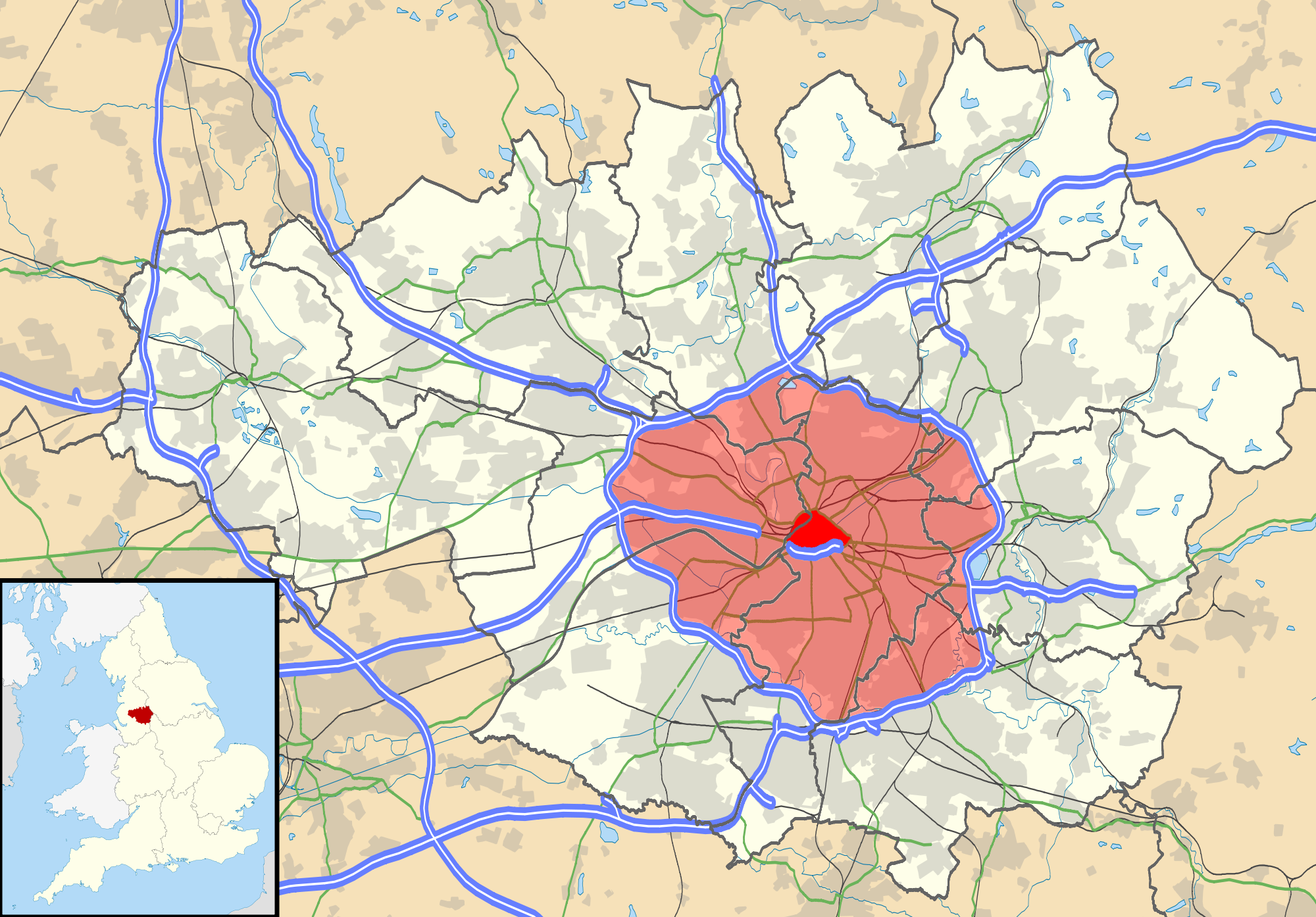
A map of Greater Manchester highlighting area of the rejected congestion charging scheme

Hong Kong conducted a pilot test on an electronic congestion pricing system between 1983 and 1985 with positive results. However, public opposition against this policy stalled its permanent implementation.

In 2002 Edinburgh, United Kingdom, initiated an implementation process; a referendum was conducted in 2005, with a majority of 74.4% rejecting the proposal.

Councils from across the West Midlands in the United Kingdom, including Birmingham and Coventry, rejected the idea of imposing congestion pricing schemes on the area in 2008, despite promises from central government of transport project funding in exchange for the implementation of a road pricing pilot scheme.

In 2007, New York City shelved a proposal for a three-year pilot program for implementation in Manhattan, and a new proposition was denied in 2008, with potential federal grants of US$354 million being reallocated to other American cities.

Greater Manchester, United Kingdom, was considering a scheme with two cordons, one covering the main urban core of the Greater Manchester Urban Area and another covering the Manchester city centre. The measure was supported by the government, but three local authorities rejected it (Bury, Trafford and Stockport); the support of two-thirds of Manchester's 10 local councils was needed for it to be implemented. A comprehensive transport investment package for Manchester, which included the congestion pricing element, was released for further public consultation and was to be subject of a referendum in December 2008. On 12 December 2008 the scheme was overwhelmingly rejected by 10 out of 10 councils by a public referendum.

==== Current proposals ====
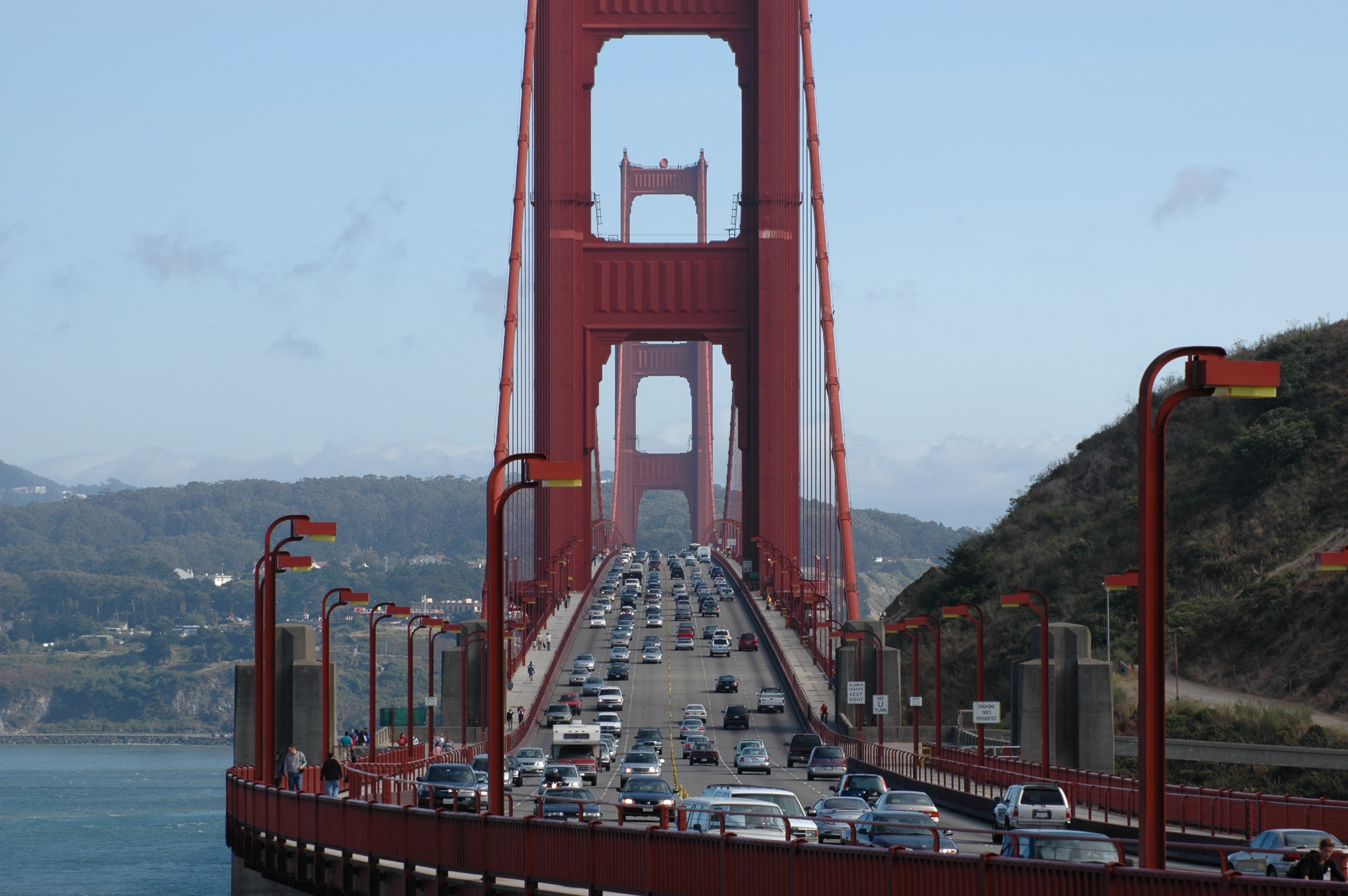
Traffic entering San Francisco through the Golden Gate Bridge.

===== United States =====
In August 2007, the United States Department of Transportation selected five metropolitan areas to initiate congestion pricing demonstration projects under the Urban Partnerships Congestion Initiative, for US$1 billion of federal funding. The five projects under this initiative are Golden Gate Bridge in San Francisco, State Route 520 serving downtown Seattle and communities to its east, Interstate 95 between Miami and Ft. Lauderdale, Interstate 35W serving downtown Minneapolis, and a variable rate parking meter system in Chicago plus Metro ExpressLanes in Los Angeles County, which replaced New York City after it left the program in 2008.

San Francisco transport authorities began a feasibility study in 2006 to evaluate the introduction of congestion pricing. The charge would be combined with other traffic reduction implementations, allowing money to be raised for public transit improvements and bike and pedestrian enhancements. The initial pricing scenarios were presented in public meetings conducted in December 2008, and the final study results were announced in November 2010, proposing modified alternatives based on the public's feedbacks, and the updated proposal calls for implementing a six-month to one-year trial in 2015.

===== China =====
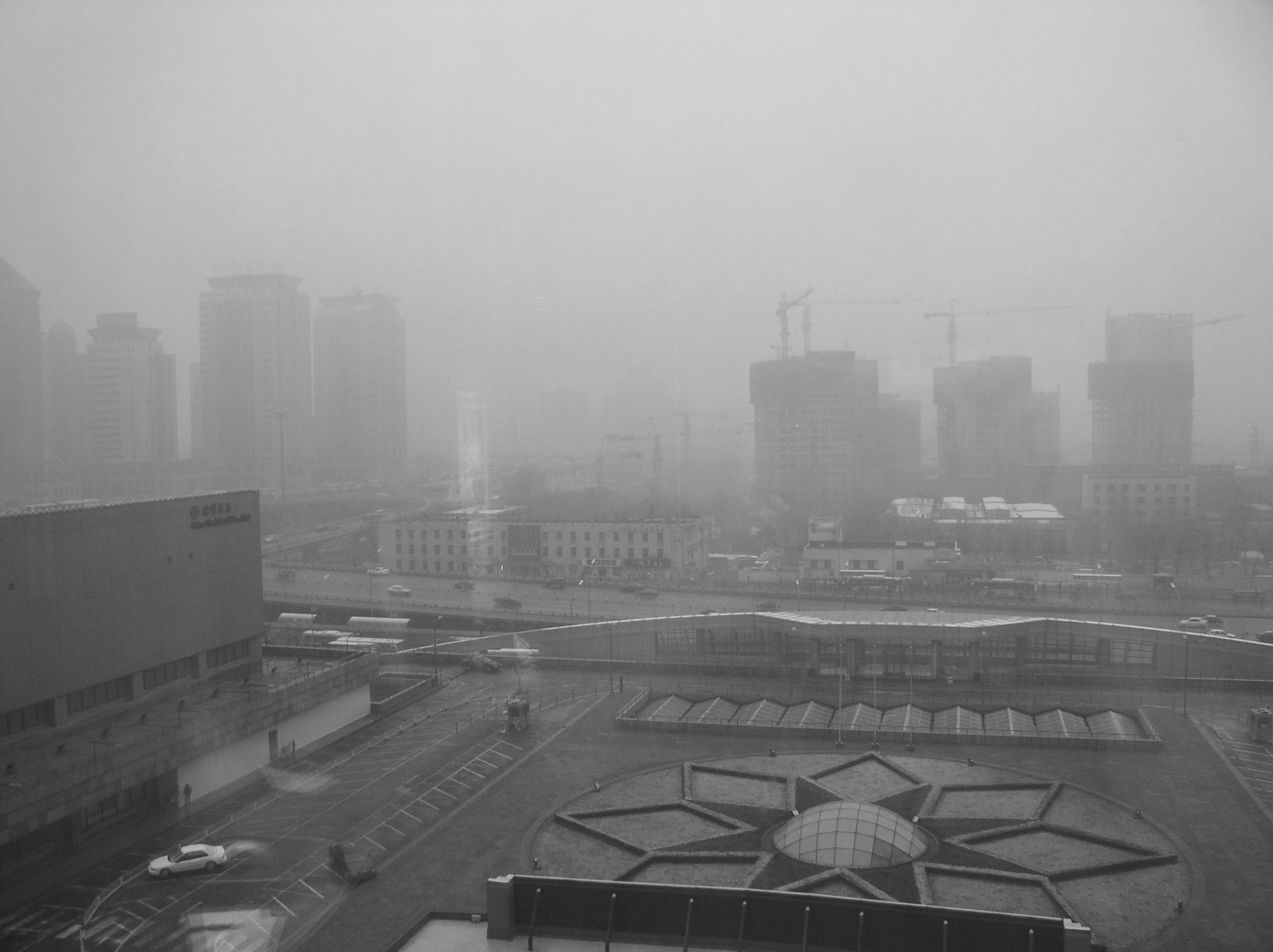
Severe air pollution in Beijing. Motor vehicle emissions account for 31% of the city's smog sources.

In September 2011, local officials announced plans to introduce congestion pricing in Beijing. No details were provided regarding the magnitude of the congestion charges or the charge zone. The measure was initially proposed in 2010 and was recommended by the World Bank. A similar scheme was proposed for the city Guangzhou, Guangdong province, in early 2010. The city opened a public discussion on whether to introduce congestion charges. An online survey conducted by two local news outlets found that 84.4% of respondents opposed the charges.

In December 2015, the Beijing Municipal Commission of Transport announced plans to introduce congestion charges in 2016. According to city's motor vehicle emission control plan 2013–2017, the congestion charge will be a real-time variable pricing scheme based on actual traffic flows and emissions data, and allow the fee to be charged for different vehicles and varying by time of the day and for different districts. The Dongcheng and Xicheng are among the districts that are most likely to firstly implement congestion charge. Vehicle emissions account for 31% of the city's smog sources, according to Beijing Environmental Protection Bureau. The local government has implemented already several policies to address air quality and congestion, such as a driving restriction scheme based upon the last digits on their license plates. Also a vehicle quota system was introduced in 2011, awarding new car licenses through a lottery, with a ceiling of 6 million units set by the city authority for 2017. In May 2016, the Beijing city legislature announced it will consider to start levying traffic congestion charges by 2020 as part of a package of measures to reform the vehicle quota system. As of June 2016, the city's environmental and transport departments are working together on a congestion pricing proposal.

===== Brazil =====
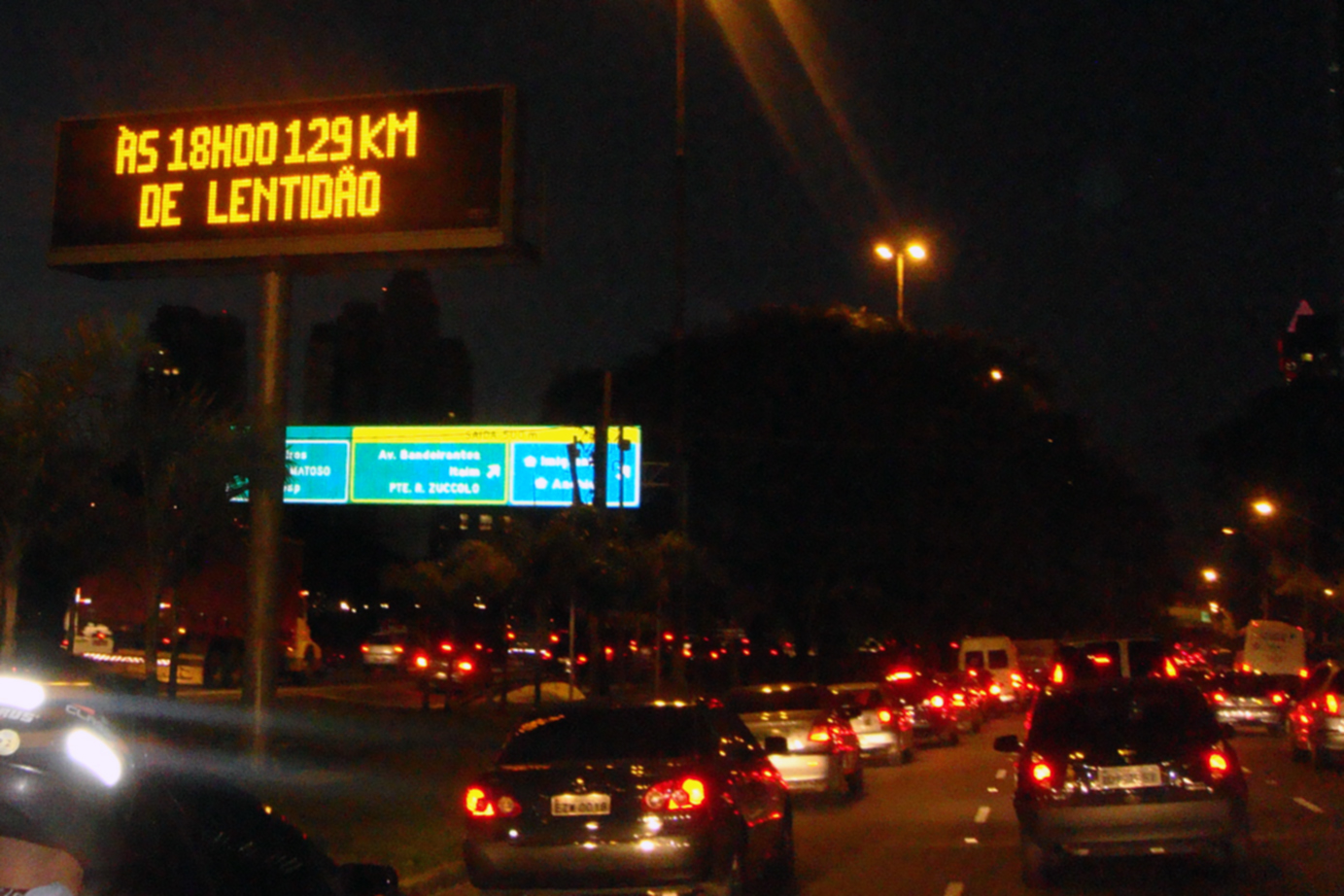
Traffic congestion on Marginal Pinheiros, near downtown São Paulo. According to Time magazine, São Paulo has the world's worst traffic jams. Drivers are informed through variable message signs the prevailing queue length.

In January 2012, the federal government of Brazil enacted the Urban Mobility Law that authorizes municipalities to implement congestion pricing to reduce traffic flows. The law also seeks to encourage the use of public transportation and reduce air pollution. According to the law, revenues from congestion charges should be destined exclusively to urban infrastructure for public transportation and non-motorized modes of locomotion (such as walking and cycling), and to finance public subsidies to transit fares. The law went into effect in April 2013.

In April 2012, one of the committees of the São Paulo city council approved a bill to introduce congestion pricing within the same area as the existing road space rationing (Portuguese: Rodízio veicular) by the last digit of the license plate, which has been in force 1996. The proposed charge is R$4 (~ US$2) per day and it is expected to reduce traffic by 30% and raise about R$2.5 billion (~ US$1.25 billion) per year, most of which will be destined to the expansion of the São Paulo Metro system and bus corridors. The bill still needs approval by two other committees before going for a final vote at the city council. Since 1995, 11 bills have been presented in the city council to introduce congestion pricing. Opinion surveys have shown that the initiative is highly unpopular. A survey by Veja magazine found that 80% of drivers are against congestion pricing, and another survey by Exame magazine found that only 1% of São Paulo's residents support the initiative, while 30% find that extending the metro system is a better solution to reduce traffic congestion. São Paulo's strategic urban development plan "SP 2040", approved in November 2012, proposes the implementation of congestion pricing by 2025, when the density of metro and bus corridors is expected to reach 1.25 km/km^{2}. The Plan also requires ample consultation and even a referendum before beginning implementation.

===== Thailand =====
In October 2024, Thailand's Ministry of Transport announced plans for a 40-50 Baht congestion charge for motorists who enter streets in inner Bangkok. The funds would be used to subsidize a 20 Baht fare for all railway lines in Greater Bangkok. The plans were supported by Governor of Bangkok Chadchart Sittipunt, who advocated for an expansion of Bangkok's transit network, including electric train and bus service along with pedestrian infrastructure.

=== Urban corridors and toll rings ===
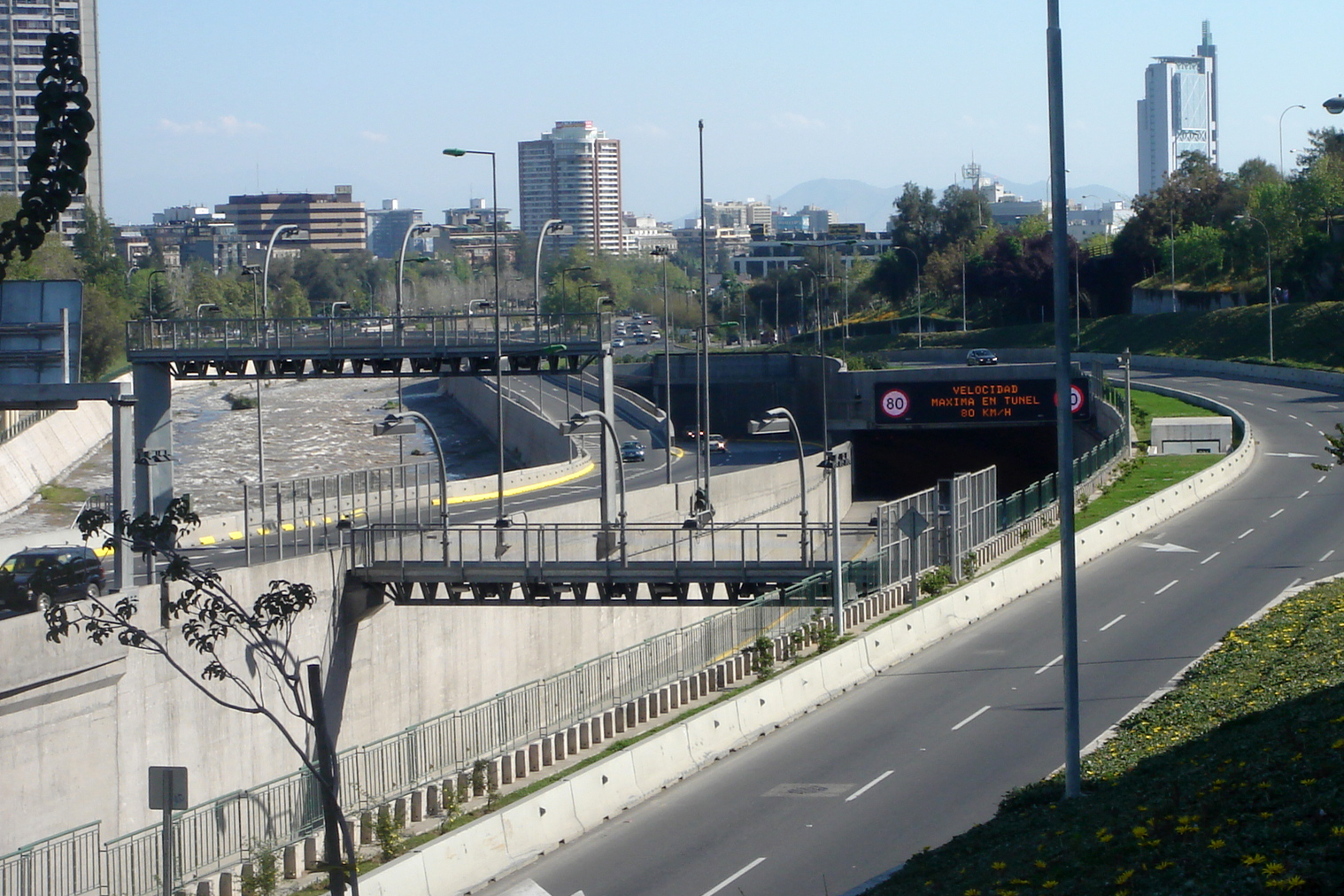
"Costanera Norte" Freeway, crossing downtown with 100% free flow, Santiago, Chile

Congestion pricing has also been implemented in urban freeways. Between 2004 and 2005, Santiago implemented the first 100% non-stop urban toll for a freeway passing through a downtown area, charging by the distance traveled. Congestion pricing has been used since 2007 during rush hours in order to maintain reasonable speeds within the city core.

Norway pioneered the implementation of electronic urban tolling in the main corridors of Norway's three major cities: Bergen (1986), Oslo (1990), and Trondheim (1991). In Bergen cars can only enter the central area using a toll road, so that the effect is similar to a congestion charge. Though initially intended only to raise revenues to finance road infrastructure, the urban toll ring at Oslo created an unintended congestion pricing effect, as traffic decreased by around 5%. The Trondheim Toll Scheme also has congestion pricing effects, as charges vary by time of day. The Norwegian authorities pursued authorization to implement congestion charges in cities, and legislation was approved by Parliament in 2001. In October 2011 the Norwegian government announced the introduction of rules allowing congestion charging in cities. The measure is intended to cut greenhouse gas and air pollutant emissions, and relieve traffic congestion. As of November 2015, Norwegian authorities have implemented urban charging schemes that operates both on the motorways and for access into downtown areas in five additional cities or municipalities: Haugesund, Kristiansand, Namsos, Stavanger, and Tønsberg.

The Norwegian electronic toll collection system is called AutoPASS and is part of the joint venture EasyGo.

=== Single facilities ===
==== Urban ====
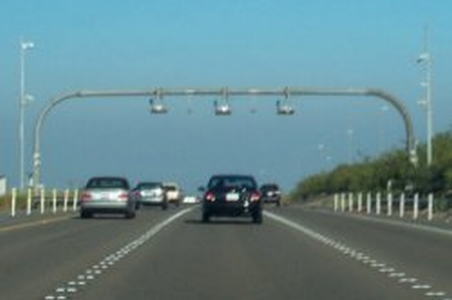
FasTrak HOT lanes at 91 Express Lanes, at Orange County, California

Congestion pricing has also been applied to specific roadways. The first of this kind of specific schemes allowed users of low or single-occupancy vehicles to use a high-occupancy vehicle lanes (HOV) if they pay a toll. This scheme is known as high-occupancy toll lanes (HOT) lanes, and it has been introduced mainly in the United States and Canada. The first practical implementations was California's private toll 91 Express Lanes, in Orange County in 1995, followed in 1996 by Interstate 15 in San Diego. There has been controversy over this concept, and HOT schemes have been called "Lexus" lanes, as critics see this new pricing scheme as a perk to the rich. According to the Texas A&M Transportation Institute, by 2012 there were in the United States 722 corridor-miles of HOV lanes, 294 corridor-miles of HOT/Express lanes and 163 corridor-miles of HOT/Express lanes under construction.

Congestion pricing in the form of variable tolls by time-of-the-day have also been implemented in bridges and tunnels providing access to the central business districts of several major cities. In most cases there was a toll already in existence. Dynamic pricing is relatively rare compared to variable pricing. One example of dynamic tolling is Interstate 66 in the Washington, D.C., metro area, where at times of severe congestion tolls can reach almost US$50. However, on average, round trip prices are much lower: $11.88 (2019), $5.04 (2020), $4.75 (2021).

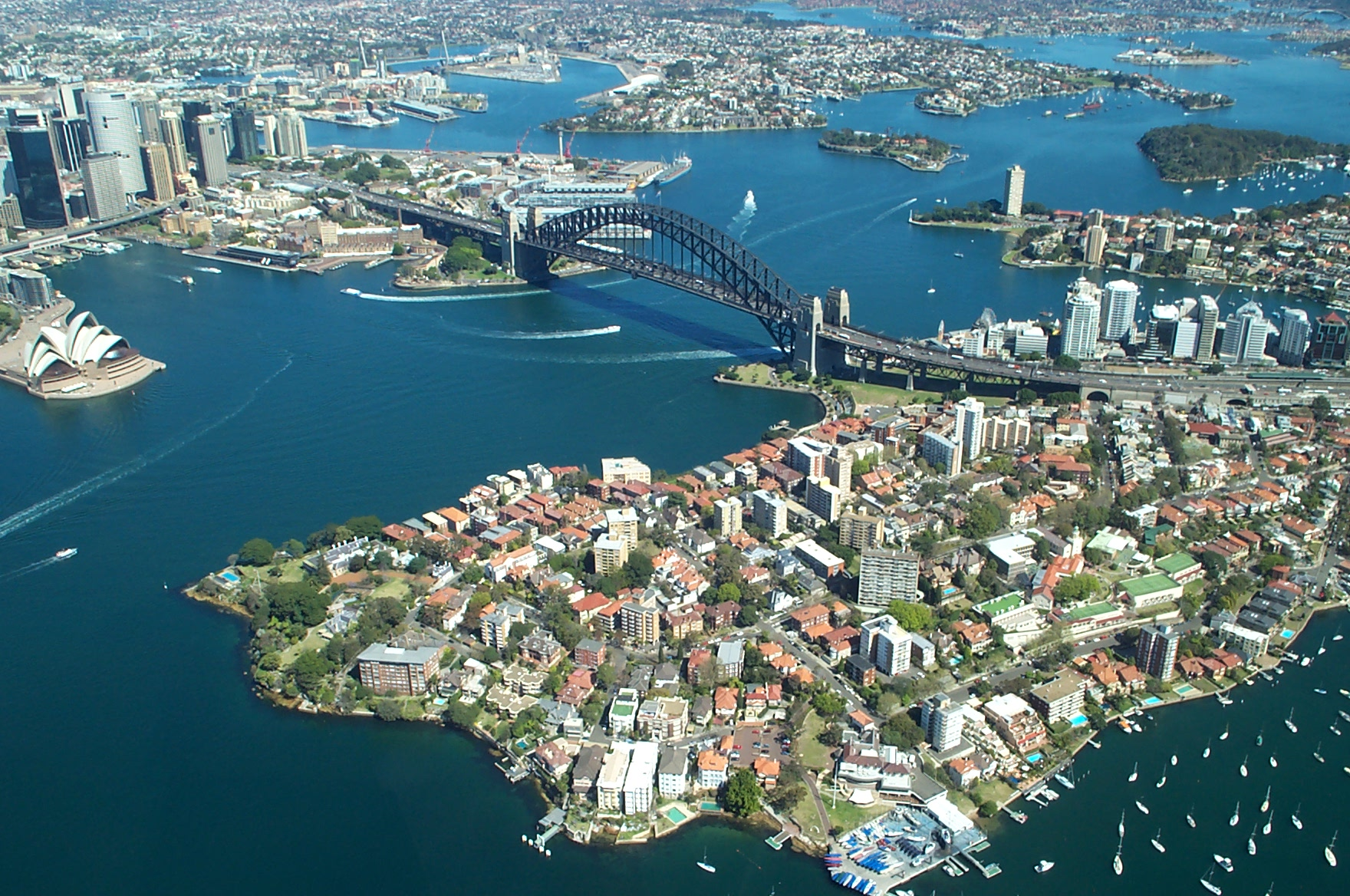
Variable tolls by time-of the-day were implemented on the Sydney Harbour Bridge in January 2009.

In March 2001, the Port Authority of New York and New Jersey (PANYNJ) implemented a discount on regular toll fees during off-peak hours for those vehicles paying electronically with an E-ZPass issued in New York State. These discount toll was implemented at several tunnels and bridges connecting New York City and New Jersey, including the George Washington Bridge, Lincoln Tunnel, and Holland Tunnel, and at some other bridges administered by PANYNJ. Since March 2008, qualified low-emission automobiles with a fuel economy of at least 45 miles per gallon are eligible to receive a Port Authority Green Pass, which allows for a 50% discount during off-peak hours as compared to the regular full toll.

In January 2009, variable tolls were implemented at Sydney Harbour Bridge, two weeks after upgrading to 100% free-flow electronic toll collection. The highest fees are charged during the morning and afternoon peak periods; a toll 25% lower applies for the shoulder periods; and a toll lower than the previously existing is charged at nights, weekends, and public holidays. This is Australia's first road congestion pricing scheme, and has had only a very minor effect on traffic levels, reducing them by 0.19%.

In July 2010 congestion tolls were implemented at the San Francisco–Oakland Bay Bridge. The Bay Bridge congestion pricing scheme charges a US$6 toll from 5 a.m. to 10 a.m. and 3 p.m. to 7 p.m., Monday through Friday. During weekends cars pay US$5. The toll remained at the previous toll of US$4 at all other times on weekdays. According to the Bay Area Toll Authority fewer users are driving during the peak hours and more vehicles are crossing the Bay Bridge before and after the 5–10 a.m. period in which the congestion toll goes into effect. The agency also reported that commute delays in the first six months have dropped by an average of 15 percent compared with 2009. When the congestion tolls were proposed, the agency expected the scheme to produce a 20 to 30 percent drop in commute traffic.

==== Non-urban ====
Autoroute A1 in Northern France is one of the few cases of congestion pricing implemented outside of urban areas. This is an expressway connecting Paris to Lille, and since 1992 congestion prices have been applied during weekends with the objective of spreading demand on the trip back to Paris on Sunday afternoons and evenings.

=== Research ===
==== Measurement of effects ====
In a road network, congestion can be considered a specific measure of the time delay in a journey or time lost through traffic jams. Delays can be caused by some combination of traffic density, road capacity, and the delaying effects of other road users and traffic management schemes such as traffic lights, junctions, and street works. This can be measured as the extra journey time needed to traverse a congested route when compared to the same route with no such interference. However, this technical definition of congestion as a measurement of delay can get confused and used interchangeably with traffic density in the public mind.

To measure the true effects of any traffic management scheme it is normally necessary to establish a baseline, or "do nothing" case, which estimates the effects on the network without any changes other than normal trends and expected local changes. Notably this was not done for the London congestion charging scheme, which has led to claims that it is not possible to determine the extent of the actual influence of the scheme. Regardless of the scheme's impact, in a retrospective analysis Transport for London (TfL) estimated there would have already been a significant reduction in traffic as a consequence of parking policies and increased congestion due to traffic management and other interventions that had the effect of reducing highway capacity. In 2006, the last year before the zone was expanded, TfL observed that traffic flows were lower than in any recent year, while network traffic speeds were also lower than in any recent year.

In 2013, ten years since its implementation, TfL reported that the congestion charging scheme resulted in a 10% reduction in traffic volumes from baseline conditions, and an overall reduction of 11% in vehicle kilometres in London between 2000 and 2012. Despite these gains, traffic speeds have also been getting progressively slower over the past decade, particularly in central London. TfL explains that the historic decline in traffic speeds is most likely due to interventions that have reduced the effective capacity of the road network in order to improve the urban environment, increase road safety and prioritise public transport, pedestrian and cycle traffic, as well as an increase in road works by utilities and general development activity since 2006. TfL concludes that while levels of congestion in central London are close to pre-charging levels, the effectiveness of the congestion charge in reducing traffic volumes means that conditions would be worse without the Congestion Charging scheme.

==== New York City Congestion Pricing Environmental Assessment Study ====
In May 2023, the Metropolitan Transportation Authority (MTA) finalized and published the Environmental Assessment (EA) of the congestion program which included a public comment period of 30 days, ending on June 12, 2023. The EA included a comprehensive regional study of 22 million people taking 28.8 million journeys per average weekday in a 28-county area covering New York, New Jersey and Connecticut. Under the regional study, the MTA along with other sponsoring organizations included data from local studies as well as county data and observed significant patterns if congestion pricing were implemented. By June 22, 2023, the Federal Highway Administration (FHWA) published its Finding of No Significant Impact (FONSI) decision of the project. Under the FONSI decision, the FHWA found that the EA addressed public input, considered the impacts, and appropriately mitigated adverse effects. In the EA, it showed potential improvements on regional air quality as some drivers will shift from vehicle transportation to transit within the New York Metropolitan region.

The EA reports 7 "alternative" scenarios for the congestion pricing project with the outlier differences where congestion pricing is fully implemented (known as "Scenario A") and the scenario where no action is taken from the project. The result of congestion pricing (Scenario A) in relative to the "no action" alternative is a 7.1% to 9.2% reduction in daily vehicle miles traveled, a 15.4% to 19.9% reduction in the number of vehicles entering congestion zone, and would have an estimated $1.02 to $1.48 billion net revenue for the program. Nitrogen oxide emissions would have been estimated to drop by 9.54% within the zone and approximately 5.96% in New York County (Manhattan). Other pollutants such as carbon emissions would have been expected to drop by 11.48% as well as fine particulate matter (PM2.5 & PM10) by 11.37% and 12.16% respectively.

The study also projects an increase in air pollutants in neighboring areas outside of the congestion zone. In particular, Bergen County in New Jersey would have been estimated to observe a 0.63% increase in nitrogen oxide emissions if congestion tolls are placed. Residents of the Bronx would have seen a 0.09% increase in nitrogen oxide emissions. Other areas with similar increasing air pollutant projections include Richmond and Putnam counties. Furthermore, the EA also indicated a slight significance on the number of vehicles on some highways if congestion pricing were implemented but showed a lack of significance in vehicle miles traveled. The EA data for a 2045 projection projected a 10.4% reduction in crossings from Brooklyn to the congestion zone which includes the BQE (Brooklyn-Queens Expressway) and other connected entryways such as the Manhattan and Brooklyn Bridge. Under congestion pricing, there will be a 5.4% decrease in vehicles on FDR Drive. These reductions represent 16,000 to 42,000 fewer people accessing the congestion zone in a private automobile on an average weekday.

The EA reported a lack of significant change in congestion (in vehicle miles traveled). For instance, the highway, FDR Drive would have been projected to experience a 0.2% increase in vehicle miles traveled. Nonetheless, some officials remain optimistic, citing that congestion pricing would have reduced the amount of traffic especially in areas like the BQE by around 7-10%. The study also projects an increase in air pollutants in neighboring areas outside of the congestion zone. In particular, Bergen County in New Jersey would have been estimated to observe a 0.63% increase in nitrogen oxide emissions if congestion tolls are placed. Residents of the Bronx would have seen a 0.09% increase in nitrogen oxide emissions. Other areas with similar increasing air pollutant projections include Richmond and Putnam counties. Furthermore, the EA also indicated a slight significance on the number of vehicles on some highways if congestion pricing were implemented but showed a lack of significance in vehicle miles traveled. The EA data for a 2045 projection projected a 10.4% reduction in crossings from Brooklyn to the congestion zone which includes the BQE (Brooklyn-Queens Expressway) and other connected entryways such as the Manhattan and Brooklyn Bridge. Under congestion pricing, there will be a 5.4% decrease in vehicles on FDR Drive. These reductions represent 16,000 to 42,000 fewer people accessing the congestion zone in a private automobile on an average weekday. The EA reported a lack of significant change in congestion (in vehicle miles traveled). For instance, the highway, FDR Drive would have been projected to experience a 0.2% increase in vehicle miles traveled. Nonetheless, some officials remain optimistic, citing that congestion pricing would have reduced the amount of traffic especially in areas like the BQE by around 7-10%.

==== Academic debate and concerns ====
Even the transport economists who advocate congestion pricing have anticipated several practical limitations, concerns and controversial issues regarding the actual implementation of this policy. As summarized by Cervero:

True social-cost pricing of metropolitan travel has proven to be a theoretical ideal that so far has eluded real-world implementation. The primary obstacle is that except for professors of transportation economics and a cadre of vocal environmentalists, few people are in favor of considerably higher charges for peak-period travel. Middle-class motorists often complain they already pay too much in gasoline taxes and registration fees to drive their cars, and that to pay more during congested periods would add insult to injury. In the United States, few politicians are willing to champion the cause of congestion pricing for fear of reprisal from their constituents. Critics also argue that charging more to drive is elitist policy, pricing the poor off of roads so that the wealthy can move about unencumbered. It is for all these reasons that peak-period pricing remains a pipe dream in the minds of many.

Both Button and Small et al., have identified the following issues:

- The real-world demand functions for urban road travel are more complex than the theoretical functions used in transport economics analysis. Congestion pricing was developed as a first-best solution, based on the assumption that the optimal price of road space equals the marginal cost price if all other goods in the economy are also marginal cost priced. In the real world this is not true, thus, actual implementation of congestion pricing is just a proxy or second-best solution. Based on the economic principles behind congestion pricing, the optimal congestion charge should make up for the difference between the average cost paid by the driver and the marginal cost imposed on other drivers (such as extra delay) and on society as a whole (such as air pollution). The practical challenge of setting optimal link-based tolls is daunting given that neither the demand functions nor the link-specific speed-flow curves can be known precisely. Therefore, transport economists recognize that in practice setting the right price for the congestion charge becomes a trial and error experience.
- Inequality issue: A main concern is the possibility of undesirable distribution repercussions because of the diversity of road users. The use of the tolled road depends on the user's level of income. Where some cannot afford to pay the congestion charge, then this policy is likely to privilege the middle-class and rich. The users who shift to some less-preferred alternative are also worse off. The less wealthy are the more likely to switch to public transit. Road space rationing is another strategy generally viewed as more equitable than congestion pricing. However, high-income users can always avoid the travel restrictions by owning a second car and users with relatively inelastic demand (such as a worker who needs to transport tools to a job site) are relatively more impacted.
- There are difficulties in deciding how to allocate the revenues raised. This is a controversial issue among scholars. The revenues can be used to improve public transport (as is the case in London), or to invest in new road infrastructure (as in Oslo). Some academics make the case that revenues should be disposed as a direct transfer payments to former road users. Congestion pricing is not intended to increase public revenues or to become just another tax, however this is precisely one of the main concerns of road users and taxpayers.

One alternative, aimed at avoiding inequality and revenue allocation issues, is to implement a rationing of peak period travel through mobility rights or revenue-neutral credit-based congestion pricing. This system would be similar to the existing emissions trading of carbon credit. Metropolitan area or city residents, or the taxpayers, would be issued mobility rights or congestion credits, and would have the option of using these for themselves, or trading or selling them to anyone willing to continue traveling by automobile beyond their personal quota. This trading system would allow direct benefits to be accrued by those users shifting to public transportation or by those reducing their peak-hour travel rather than the government.

==== Public controversy ====
Experience from the few cities where congestion pricing has been implemented shows that social and political acceptability is key. Public discontent with congestion pricing, or rejection of congestion pricing proposals, is due mainly to the inequality issues, the economic burden on neighboring communities, the effect on retail businesses and the economic activity in general, and the fears that the revenues will become just another tax.

Congestion pricing remains highly controversial with the public both before and after implementation. This has in part been resolved through referendums, such as after the seven-month trial period in Stockholm; however this creates a debate as to where the border line for the referendum should go, since it is often the people living outside the urban area who have to pay the tax, while the external benefit is granted to those who live within the area. In Stockholm there was a majority in the referendum within the city border (where the votes counted), but not outside.

Some concerns have also been expressed regarding the effects of cordon area congestion pricing on economic activity and land use, as the benefits are usually evaluated from the urban transportation perspective only. However, congestion pricing schemes have been used with the main objective of improving urban quality and to preserve historical heritage in the small cities.

The effects of a charge on business have been disputed; reports have shops and businesses being heavily impacted by the cost of the charge, both in terms of lost sales and increased delivery costs in London, while others show that businesses were then supporting the charge six months after implementation. Reports show business activity within the charge zone had been higher in both productivity and profitability and that the charge had a "broadly neutral impact" on the London wide economy, while others claim an average drop in business of 25% following the 2007 extension.

Other criticism has been raised concerning the environmental effects on neighborhoods bordering the congestion zone, with critics claiming that congestion pricing would create "parking lots" and add more traffic and pollution to those neighborhoods, and the imposition of a regressive tax on some commuters. Stockholm's trial of congestion pricing, however, showed a reduction in traffic in areas outside the congestion zone. Other opponents argue that the pricing could become a tax on middle- and lower-class residents, since those citizens would be affected the most financially. The installation of cameras for tracking purposes may also raise civil liberties concerns.

=== Effects ===
A 2019 study of congestion pricing in Stockholm between 2006 and 2010 found that in the absence of congestion pricing that Stockholm's air would have been 5 to 15 percent more polluted between 2006 and 2010", and that young children would have suffered substantially more asthma attacks. A 2020 study that analyzed driving restrictions in Beijing estimated that the implementation of congestion pricing would reduce total traffic, increase traffic speed, reduce pollution, reduce greenhouse gas emissions, reduce traffic accidents, and increase tax revenues. A 2020 study of London found that congestion pricing (introduced in 2003) led to reductions in pollution and reductions in driving, but it increased pollution from diesel vehicles (which were exempt from the congestion pricing). A 2021 study found that congestion pricing reduced CO_{2} emissions through downsizing commuting distances and housing sizes.

A 2013 study found that after congestion pricing was implemented in Seattle, drivers reported greater satisfaction with the routes covered by congestion pricing and reported lower stress.

A 2016 study found that more people used public transportation due to increases in congestion pricing in Singapore. A 2016 study found that the prices of retail, but not office and residential, real estate dropped by 19% within the cordoned-off areas of Singapore where congestion pricing was in place relative to the areas outside of the area.

== Waterways ==
=== Panama Canal booking system and auction ===
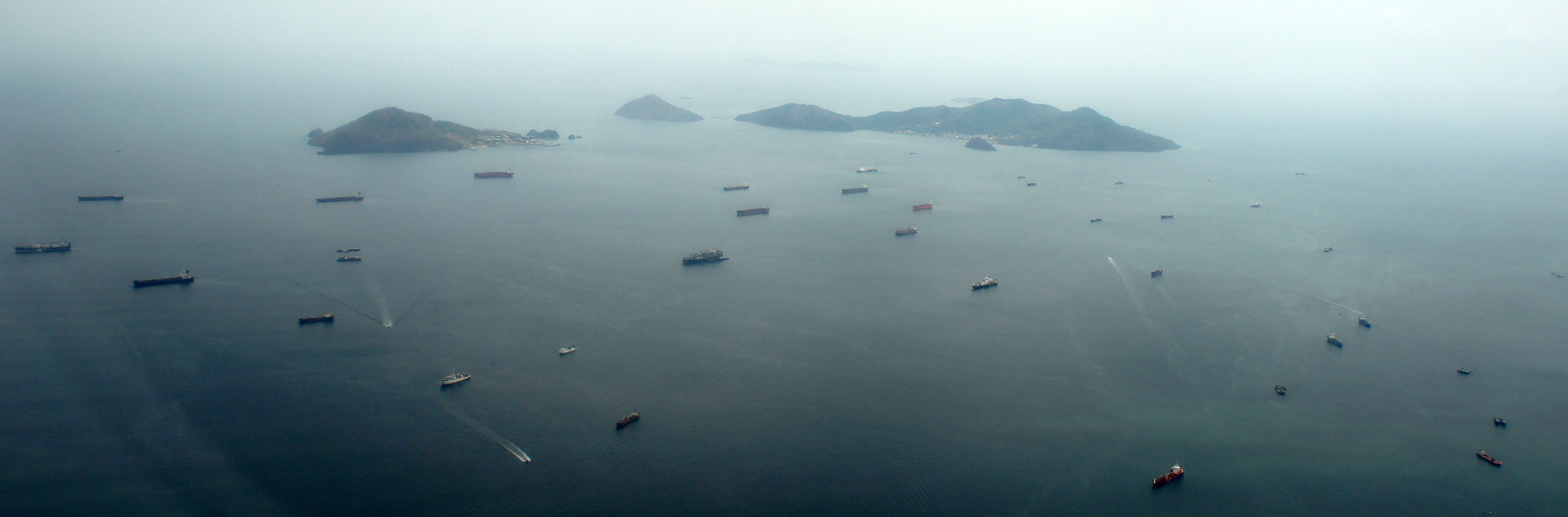
Several dozen vessels queuing at the Pacific Ocean waiting to enter the Panama Canal

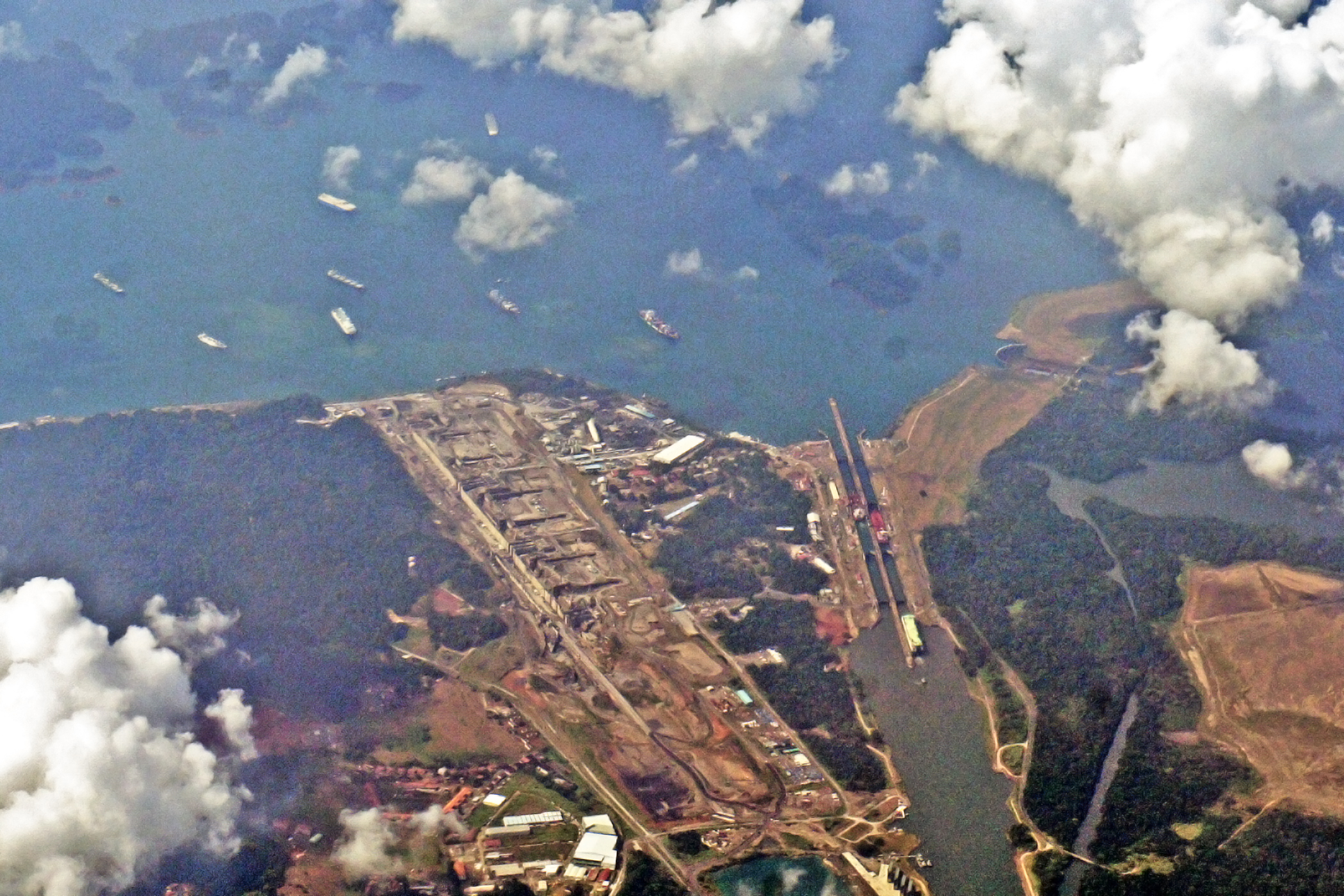
Vessels waiting at the Gatun Lake to cross the Gatun Locks to exit the canal at the Atlantic side

The Panama Canal has a limited capacity determined by operational times and cycles of the existing locks and further constrained by the current trend towards larger (close to Panamax-sized) vessels transiting the canal which take more transit time within the locks and navigational channels, and the need for permanent periodical maintenance works due to the aging canal, which forces periodical shutdowns of this waterway. On the other hand, demand has been growing due to the rapid growth of international trade. Also, many users require a guarantee of certain level of service. Despite the gains which have been made in efficiency, the Panama Canal Authority (ACP) estimates that the canal will reach its maximum sustainable capacity between 2009 and 2012. The long-term solution for the congestion problems was the expansion of the canal through a new third set of locks. Work started in 2007 and the expanded canal enter commercial operation in June 2016. The new locks allow transit of larger, Post-Panamax ships, which have a greater cargo capacity than the current locks are capable of handling.

Considering the high operational costs of the vessels (container ships have daily operational costs of approximately US$40,000), the long queues that occur during the high season (sometimes up to a week's delay), and the high value of some of the cargo transported through the canal, the ACP implemented a congestion pricing scheme to allow a better management of the scarce capacity available and to increase the level of service offered to the shipping companies. The scheme gave users two choices: (1) transit by order of arrival on a first-come first-served basis, as the canal historically has operated or (2) booked service for a fee—a congestion charge.

The booked service allowed two options of fees. The Transit Booking System, available online, allowing customers who do not want to wait in queue to pay an additional 15% over the regular tolls, guaranteeing a specific day for transit and crossing the canal in 18 hours or less. ACP sells 24 of these daily slots up to 365 days in advance. The second choice was high priority transit. Since 2006, ACP has available a 25th slot, sold through the Transit Slot Auction to the highest bidder. The main customers of the Transit Booking System are cruise ships, container ships, vehicle carriers, and non-containerized cargo vessels.

The highest toll for high priority passage paid through the Transit Slot Auction was US$220,300 charged on a tanker in August 2006, bypassing a 90-ship queue awaiting the end of maintenance works on the Gatun locks, thus avoiding a seven-day delay. The normal fee would have been just US$13,430. The average regular toll is around US$54,000.

== Airports ==
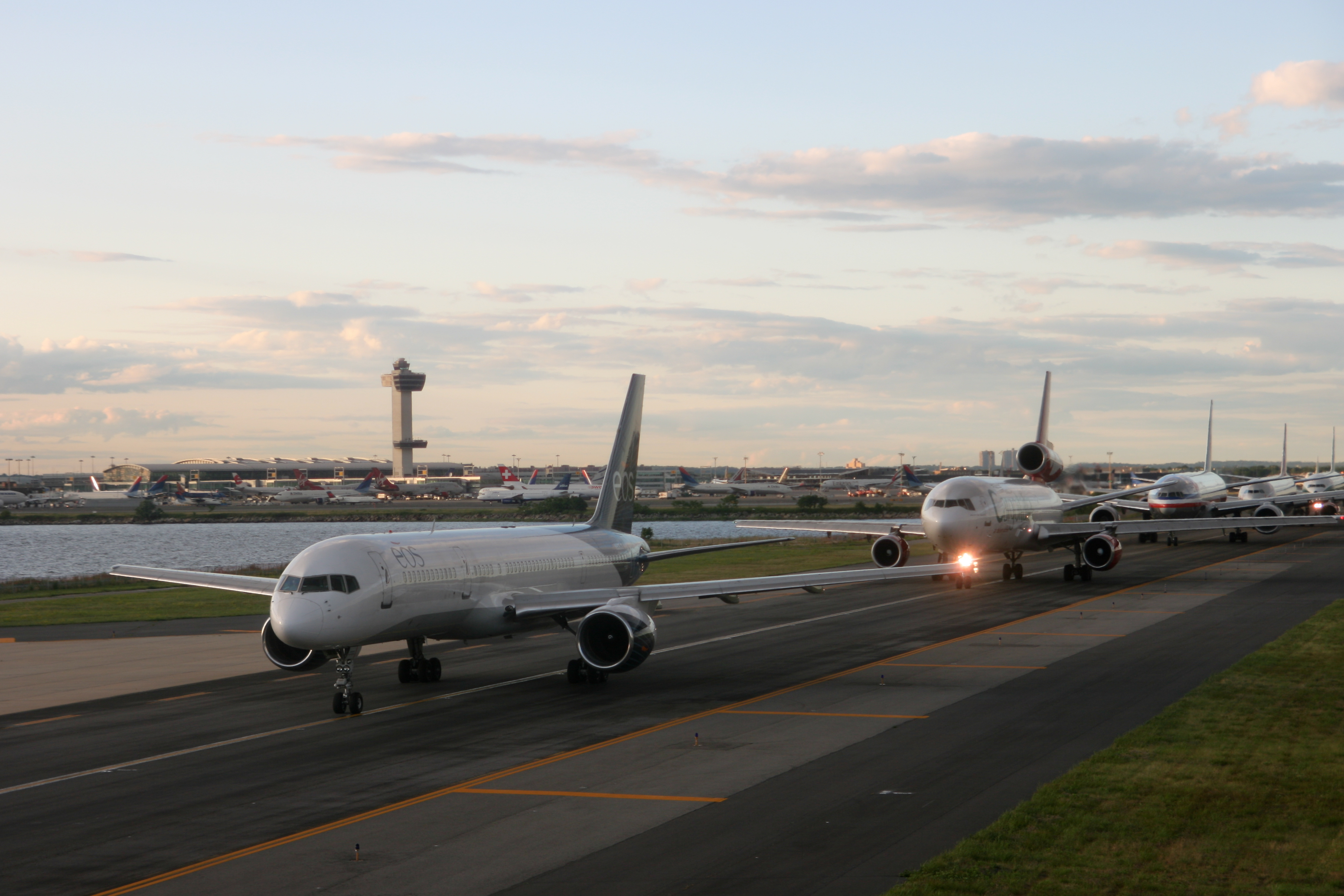
New York's John F. Kennedy International Airport, one of the world's busiest

Many airports are facing extreme congestion, runway capacity being the scarcest resource. Congestion pricing schemes have been proposed to mitigate this problem, including slot auctions, such as with the Panama Canal, but implementation has been piecemeal. The first scheme was started in 1968 when higher landing fees for peak-hour use by aircraft with 25 seats or fewer at Newark, Kennedy, and LaGuardia airports in New York City. As a result of the higher charges, general aviation activity during peak periods decreased by 30%. These fees were applied until deregulation of the industry, but higher fees for general aviation were kept to discourage this type of operations at New York's busiest airports. In 1988 a higher landing fee for smaller aircraft at Boston's Logan Airport was adopted; with this measure much of the general aviation abandoned Logan for secondary airports. In both US cases the pricing scheme was challenged in court. In the case of Boston, the judge ruled in favor of general aviation users due to lack of alternative airports. In the case of New York, the judge dismissed the case because "the fee was a justified means of relieving congestion".

Congestion pricing has also been implemented for scheduled airline services. The British Airports Authority (BAA) has been a pioneer in implementing congestion pricing for all types of commercial aviation. In 1972 implemented the first peak pricing policy, with surcharges varying depending on the season and time of the day, and by 1976 raised these peak charges. London-Heathrow had seven pricing structures between 1976 and 1984. In this case it was the US carriers that went to international arbitration in 1988 and won their case.

In 1991, the Athens Airport charged a 25% higher landing fee for those aircraft arriving between 11:00 and 17:00 during the high tourism season during summer. Hong Kong charges an additional flat fee to the basic weight charge. In 1991–92 peak pricing at London's main airports Heathrow, Gatwick and Stansted was implemented; airlines were charged different landing fees for peak and off-peak operations depending on the weight of aircraft. For example, in the case of a Boeing 757, the peak landing fee was about 2.5 times higher than the off-peak fee in all three airports. For a Boeing 747 the differential was even higher, as the old 747 carries a higher noise charge. Though related to runway congestion, the main objective of these peak charges at the major British airports was to raise revenue for investment.

== See also ==
- Automobile costs
- Braess's paradox
- Deadweight loss
- Downs–Thomson paradox
- Electricity pricing
- Low-emission zone
- Energy demand management (congestion pricing applied to electric utilities)
- GNSS road pricing
- Induced demand
- Jevons paradox
- Lewis–Mogridge position
- Pareto efficiency
- Road pricing
- Road space rationing
- Tax incidence
- Tragedy of the commons
- Transport economics
- Transportation demand management
- Variable pricing
- Vehicle miles traveled tax
- Water pricing

== Bibliography ==
- Button, Kenneth J. (2010). Transport Economics 3rd Edition. Edward Elgar Publishing, Cheltenham, UK. ISBN 978-1-84064-191-2. (See Chapter 9: Optimizing Traffic Congestion)
- Button, Kenneth J. (1993). Transport Economics 2nd Edition. Edward Elgar Publishing, Cheltenham, UK. ISBN 978-1-85278-523-9.
- Cervero, Robert (1998). The Transit Metropolis: A Global Inquiry. Island Press, Washington, D.C. ISBN 978-1-55963-591-2. (See Chapter 6: The Master-Planned Transit Metropolis: Singapore)
- Davis, Alexander; Long, Geoffrey M. (2012). Congestion Pricing - A Primer On Efficient Road Management. Nova Science Publishers, New York. ISBN 978-1-62081-480-2.
- Doganis, R. (1992). The Airport Business. Routledge, London. ISBN 978-0-415-08117-7.
- McDonald, J.F.; d'Ouville, Edmond L.; Nan Liu, Louie (1999). Economics of Urban Highway Congestion and Pricing (Transportation Research, Economics and Policy Volume 9). Springer, New York. ISBN 978-0-7923-8631-5.
- International Transport Forum, Organisation for Economic Co-operation and Development (2010). ITF Round Tables Implementing Congestion Charges. OECD Publishing, Paris. ISBN 978-92-821-0284-8.
- Kockelman, Kara M.; Kalmanje, Sukumar (2005). "Credit-Based Congestion Pricing: A Policy Proposal and the Public's Response". Transportation Research. 39A (7–9): 671–690. Bibcode:2005TRPA...39..671K. doi:10.1016/j.tra.2005.02.014.
- Peterson, Sarah Jo; MacCleery, Rachel (2013). When the Road Price Is Right: Land Use, Tolls, and Congestion Pricing. Urban Land Institute. ISBN 978-0-87420-262-5.
- Richardson, Harry W.; Chang-Hee, Christine Bae (2008). Road Congestion Pricing In Europe: Implications for the United States. Edward Elgar Publishing, Cheltenham, UK; Northampton, MA. ISBN 978-1-84720-380-9.
- Santos, Georgina, ed. (2004). Road Pricing, Volume 9: Theory and Evidence (Research in Transportation Economics). JAI Press. ISBN 978-0-7623-0968-9.
- Schade, Jens; Schlag, Bernhard (2003). Acceptability of Transport Pricing Strategies. Emerald Group Publishing, Bingley, West Yorkshire. ISBN 978-0-08-044199-3.
- Small, Kenneth A.; Verhoef, Erik T. (2007). The Economics of Urban Transportation. Routledge, New York. ISBN 978-0-415-28515-5. (See Chapter 4: Pricing and 4-3: Congestion Pricing in Practice)
- Small, Kenneth A.; Gomez-Ibañez, José A. (1998). Road Pricing for Congestion Management: The Transition from Theory to Policy. The University of California Transportation Center, University of California at Berkeley.
- Smeed, R.J. (1964). Road pricing: the economic and technical possibilities. HMSO.
- Tsekeris, Theodore; Voß, Stefan (2009). "Design and evaluation of road pricing: State-of-the-art and methodological advances". Netnomics. 10: 5–52. doi:10.1007/s11066-008-9024-z. S2CID 153724717.
- Verhoef, Erik T.; Bliemer, Michiel; Steg, Linda; Van Wee, Bert (2008). Pricing in Road Transport: A Multi-Disciplinary Perspective. Edward Elgar Publishing, Cheltenham, UK. ISBN 978-1-84542-860-0.
- Walters, A. A. (1968). The Economics of Road User Charges. World Bank Staff Occasional Papers Number Five, Washington, D.C. ISBN 978-0-8018-0653-7.
