= Congestion pricing in Hong Kong =

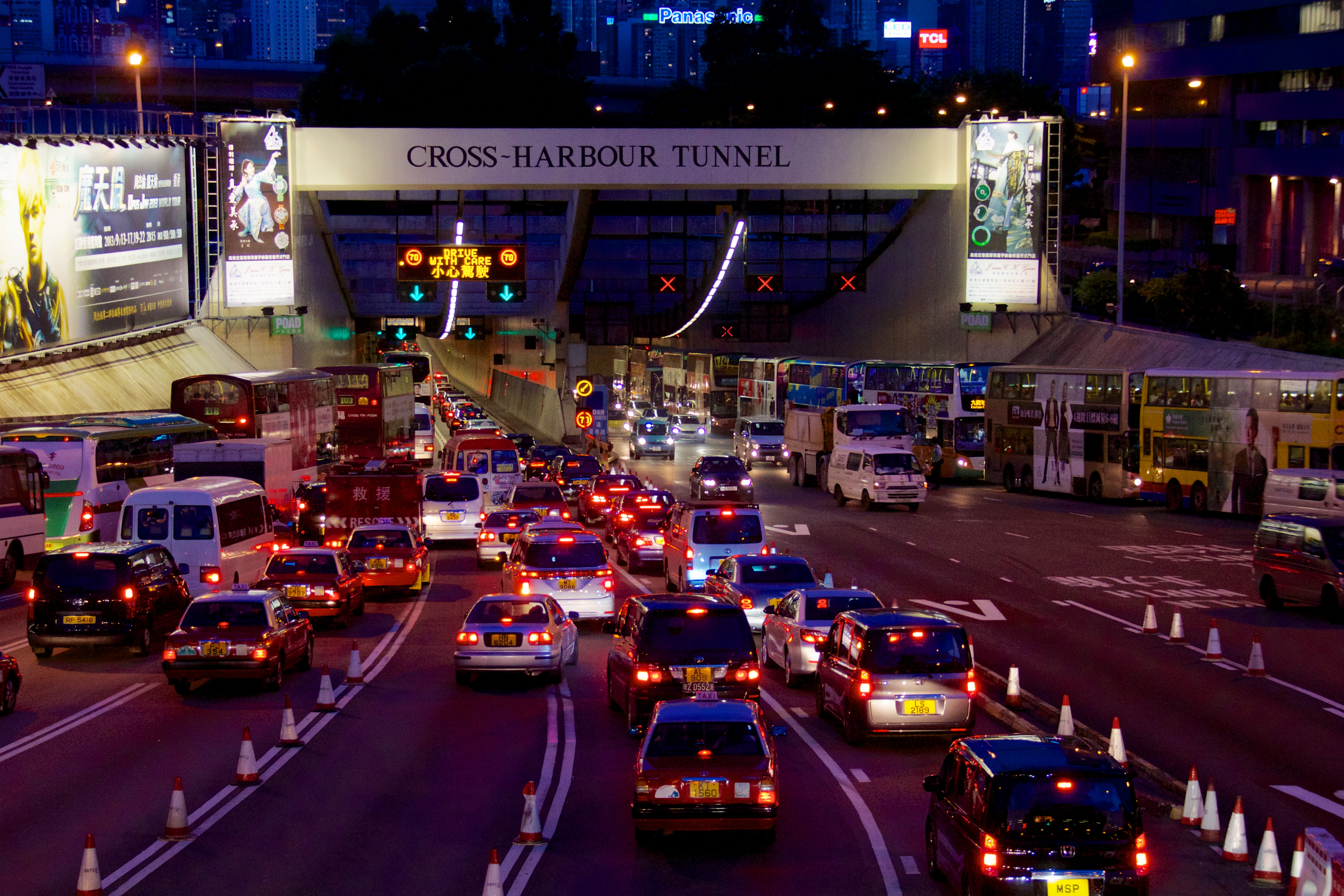
Congestion in the Cross-Harbour Tunnel.

The new toll scheme for Hong Kong's cross-harbour tunnel, also known as the "three-tunnel diversion," is a plan proposed by Hong Kong Chief Executive Carrie Lam in the 2018 Hong Kong Chief Executive's Policy Address to divert traffic from the Cross Harbour Tunnel, Eastern Harbour Crossing and Western Harbour Crossing. It is a form of congestion pricing.

== Background of the policy ==
=== Introduction ===
Traffic congestion has emerged as a significant socioeconomic issue in Hong Kong. In 2021, cross-harbour traffic during peak hours has been confirmed to exceed 26% of the total capacity of the three tunnels, and it takes drivers up to 25 minutes on average to pass through the Cross-Harbour Tunnel during the morning rush hour, a full three times higher than during the smooth traffic periods, indicating that the overall traffic congestion in the three tunnels in Hong Kong has reached its peak.

In recent years, the Hong Kong government has undertaken some efforts to address this challenge by focusing on toll adjustments to redistribute traffic across the three tunnels. Following a tortuous legislative process, the implementation of the three-tunnel diversion policy was officially released in 2023.

=== A timeline of policy development ===
2008:

Legislative Council member Raymond Ho Chung-tai proposed that the government could pay for the Western Harbour Crossing and the Harbour Crossing shares from CITIC PACIFIC. The significance of this proposal is that after the acquisition of shares, the ownership of the three tunnels will return to the Hong Kong government. By then, the Hong Kong government will have a greater initiative to reallocate the traffic flow of the three tunnels without being restricted by third parties, thereby easing traffic congestion. However, the proposal did not receive any direct response from Eva Cheng, then Secretary for Transport and Housing and the chairman of the Hong Kong housing authority. As a result, the proposal was shelved.

2013:

The then Hong Kong government led by Leung Chun-ying formally launched the tunnel consultation to the public and proposed three possible toll adjustment plans to explore the possibility of the first step of traffic diversion through the main objective of increasing the price of the Cross-Harbour Tunnel and reducing the price of the Eastern Harbour Crossing. However, the proposal was subsequently met with massive opposition from the members of the Legislative Council, which eventually led to the policy being shelved after a public consultation.

2016:

In the early morning of 7 August 2016, the Eastern Harbour Crossing 's franchise expired and the EHC was officially taken over by the Hong Kong government. At that time, the Road Tunnels (Government) Ordinance (Cap. 368) and its subsidiary legislation were formally extended to cover the Eastern Harbour Crossing. This means that the government's three tunnel diversion plan has been further pushed forward, because the management of the two main tunnels is already in the hands of the government.

2018:

The Hong Kong government, led by Carrie Lam, has again proposed a "544" scheme to adjust tolls between the three tunnels. The main proposals of the Scheme include reducing the tolls of the Western Harbour Crossing with government funding, so as to provide economic incentives to attract more people to use the less used tunnel, so as to achieve traffic diversion and relieve traffic congestion. However, the plan was eventually shelved after it failed to gain support in the Legislative Council.

2023:

The Western Harbour Crossing franchise will be held by the Western Harbour Tunnel Company Limited until 1 August 2023, and its management will be formally transferred to the Hong Kong government. By then, the three cross-harbour tunnels in Hong Kong will finally be fully managed by the Hong Kong government.

In August 2023, the first phase of the policy officially began, with the introduction of the 633 fixed toll scheme as a transitional plan. In December of the same year, the time-varying toll plan was further implemented in all directions. Until this moment, the Hong Kong Government has been negotiating for more than 10 years, the three tunnel diversion plan finally officially became a reality.

=== Details ===
==== Stage one: "633" fixed toll plan and "HKeToll" in 2023/8/20 ====
To reduce traffic flow around the Harbour Crossing and the Eastern Harbour Crossing by narrowing the difference between private car tolls as follows:

==== HKeToll ====
In Western Harbour Crossing, all manual toll booths and Autotoll lanes will be cancelled.

Private cars （All time periods）	Western Harbour Crossing	Cross-Harbour Tunnel and Eastern Harbour Crossing
Private cars （All time periods）	HK$60	HK$30
Taxi（All time periods）	HK$25	
Other vehicle types	Unchanged	

==== Stage two："Time-varying toll plan" in 2023/12/17 ====
This change was aimed to regulate traffic flow more precisely during peak hours and to encourage citizens to use the three tunnels outside peak hours. This policy also simplifies the toll structure for commercial vehicles in the Western Harbour Crossing. There is transitional tolls between the time slots.

Vehicle type	Date	Period	Western Harbour Crossing	Cross-Harbour Tunnel	Eastern Harbour Crossing
Motor cycles / motor tricycles	Monday to Saturday （Public holidays are not included）	Peak time slot	HK$24	HK$16	
Motor cycles / motor tricycles	Monday to Saturday （Public holidays are not included）	Normal time slot	HK$12		
Motor cycles / motor tricycles	Monday to Saturday （Public holidays are not included）	Off-peak time slot	HK$8		
Motor cycles / motor tricycles	Sunday and public holiday	Normal time slot	HK$10		
Motor cycles / motor tricycles	Sunday and public holiday	Off-peak time slot	HK$8		
Private cars	Monday to Saturday （Public holidays are not included）	Peak time slot	HK$60	HK$40	
Private cars	Monday to Saturday （Public holidays are not included）	Normal time slot	HK$30		
Private cars	Monday to Saturday （Public holidays are not included）	Off-peak time slot	HK$20		
Private cars	Sunday and public holiday	Normal time slot	HK$25		
Private cars	Sunday and public holiday	Off-peak time slot	HK$20		
Taxi	Everyday	All time	HK$25		
Other vehicle	Everyday	All time	HK$50		

== Criticisms and social discussion ==
=== Criticisms ===
==== Inequality ====
The 633 toll proposal introduced a significant change in the charges in a relatively complex adjustment. The proposed congestion charges level was said to have been adjusted severally after hearing opinions from the Legislative council; but despite acknowledging the positive effects that the time-subjected toll difference may help alleviate tunnel congestion, Roundtable legislator Michael Tien criticises that doubling the tolls in Cross-Harbour Tunnel and Eastern Harbour Crossing from its previous price a drop would induce inequality to their public users.

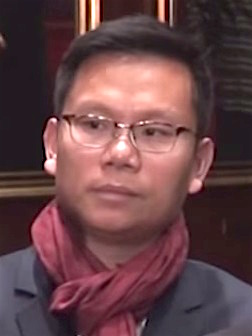
DAB Legislator and Chairperson of Transport sector Ben Chan

DAB Legislator Ben Chan also expressed concern over the increasing costs on taxi and other commercial drivers, arguing the policy should consider fixing taxis' tolls at $20 all-day while compressing tolls in commercial vehicles. He added the raise of Cross-Harbour Tunnel and Eastern Harbour Crossing to diverge traffic towards the Western Harbour Crossing may have neglected the needs of the residents in east-northern districts thus creating forced-inequality; where the residents would have relatively less flexibility and/or incentive to shift due to geographic and habit factors, forcing them to pay higher tolls with few room to hedge.

The new policy suggested a toll of $25 HKD for taxis and $50 HKD for mini buses had sparked dissatisfaction of unfairness among commercial vehicles. The Then-Commissioner for Transport Rosanna Law explains the toll fee for light trucks, licensed bus and minibus had not been adjusted for almost four decades and costs over $75 HKD in average, the new toll fee is expected to alleviate cost burden for these tunnel users in general, but did not directly address the free difference between taxi and minibus.

==== Ambiguity ====
The 2nd phase of the tunnel diversion splits time spans accordingly as "peak hours"and "non-peak hours", with different prices of tunnel tolls. In March 2023, legislator Ben Chan doubted the policy's effectiveness in altering users' traffic habits, when the "peak hours" design exhibits extensive coverage over the clock creating less temporal differences between the three harbour crossings, thus making ambiguity to the effects of time-varying tolls.

Rosanna Law assures the diversion effect of the 633 arrangement would gradually become more visible when entering the time-varying toll (also known as phase 2). She said that the new arrangement is functioning when congestion appears later than usual in the first week (August 6th 2023) of the implementation, but the effect is yet to be as obvious to expectations, while further effects are to be observed when students are added to the equation as they return to school.

==== Externalities ====
The 633 toll arrangement sets different prices to vehicles according to their types, such as private vehicles, minibus, taxis and trucks. Apart from the criticisms of inequalities in toll prices between minibus and taxi, the lower taxi toll $25 HKD compared to private vehicles $20 HKD (non-peak hours) had caught concerns in creating negative externalities in the transport business. Legislator of Functional constituency: Transport Frankie Yick Chi-ming argues the proposed toll charges difference may encourage acts of patronising unlicensed transport means (usually refer to non-commercial vehicles illegally carrying passengers), because the cost to travel across harbour would be relatively cheaper than taking a taxi.

=== Social discussion ===
==== Motorists (private car drivers) ====
Motorists have held diversified views over the latest pricing scheme. A survey conducted by Hong Kong Research Association had revealed that over 40% of local drivers agreed that the government should change the charges among the three harbour crossings to relieve the cross-harbour traffic congestion problem. Some even supported the adoption of the time-based charging system.

Opposing motorists have mainly criticised the drawbacks of the pricing scheme as the charge of Western Harbour Crossing is still too high compared to the two other harbour crossings, which will hence provide insufficient monetary incentives for motorists to change their driving habits. Some also indicated that the time-based charging system might be quite complicated for drivers to understand, resulting in more inconveniences or even opposite effects. Some further expressed their concerns on whether the scheme meets the public needs. Dr. Ringo Lee, President of Hong Kong Automobile Association, claimed that most local employees might not easily change their commuting patterns due to their inflexible working schedules, while traveling earlier would also increase their car-parking costs, these would outweigh the benefits brought by the scheme.

==== Commercial vehicle industries ====
Members from commercial vehicle industries have held different opinions over the standardised charges among the three harbour crossings. Those who support, including some taxi drivers and freight drivers, believe that this measure could motivate them to take less congested cross-harbour tunnels, especially Western Harbour Crossing, which hence helps save traveling time and increase their revenues. Some further indicated that this scheme could avoid their falling-out with passengers on taking which cross-harbour tunnels.

Disagreements mostly focus on the increasing operation costs caused by the scheme. Some taxi drivers claimed that the cancellation of early morning discounts among the harbour crossings would increase their costs to take cross-harbour businesses. Some minibus drivers indicated that due to their specific customer sources and geographical considerations, it would be troublesome for them to change their tunnel choices. The increasing tunnel charges would hence be shifted to passengers, which eventually worsens their businesses. Courier industry also revealed that they had similar concerns as minibus drivers did, while most local courier companies are small-and-medium enterprises, the latest scheme would affect their competitiveness sharply.

==== Experts ====
Most discussions among experts are focusing on the scheme's effectiveness in diverting cross-harbour traffic. Aaron Bok, former President of the Hong Kong Institution of Engineers, once claimed that the latest scheme would be reasonable in principle because it might foster cross-harbour traffic diversions in both geography and time. Some further indicated that the phased implementation could help reduce the negative impacts of the scheme and also social resistance, which hence enhances the implementation effectiveness.

Nevertheless, some local scholars believed that the latest scheme failed to tackle the structural problem of cross-harbour traffic congestion effectively, which is the insufficient provision of tunnels. It is further recommended that the government should refer to foreign examples and deploy corresponding policies including the construction of the fourth harbour crossing etc.

== Controversies ==
=== Adoption of time-based charging ===
Phase II of the New Pricing Scheme involves differential pricing for private vehicles based on their time of crossing, with drivers being charged more during peak hours. However, some legislators have expressed their dissatisfaction with the government's definition of peak hours, which currently extends from 07:30 to 10:15 am and from 4:30 to 7 pm. DAB Legislator Ben Chan has criticised the defined peak hour period as being too long, and called for a redefinition spanning from 8 to 9:30 am.

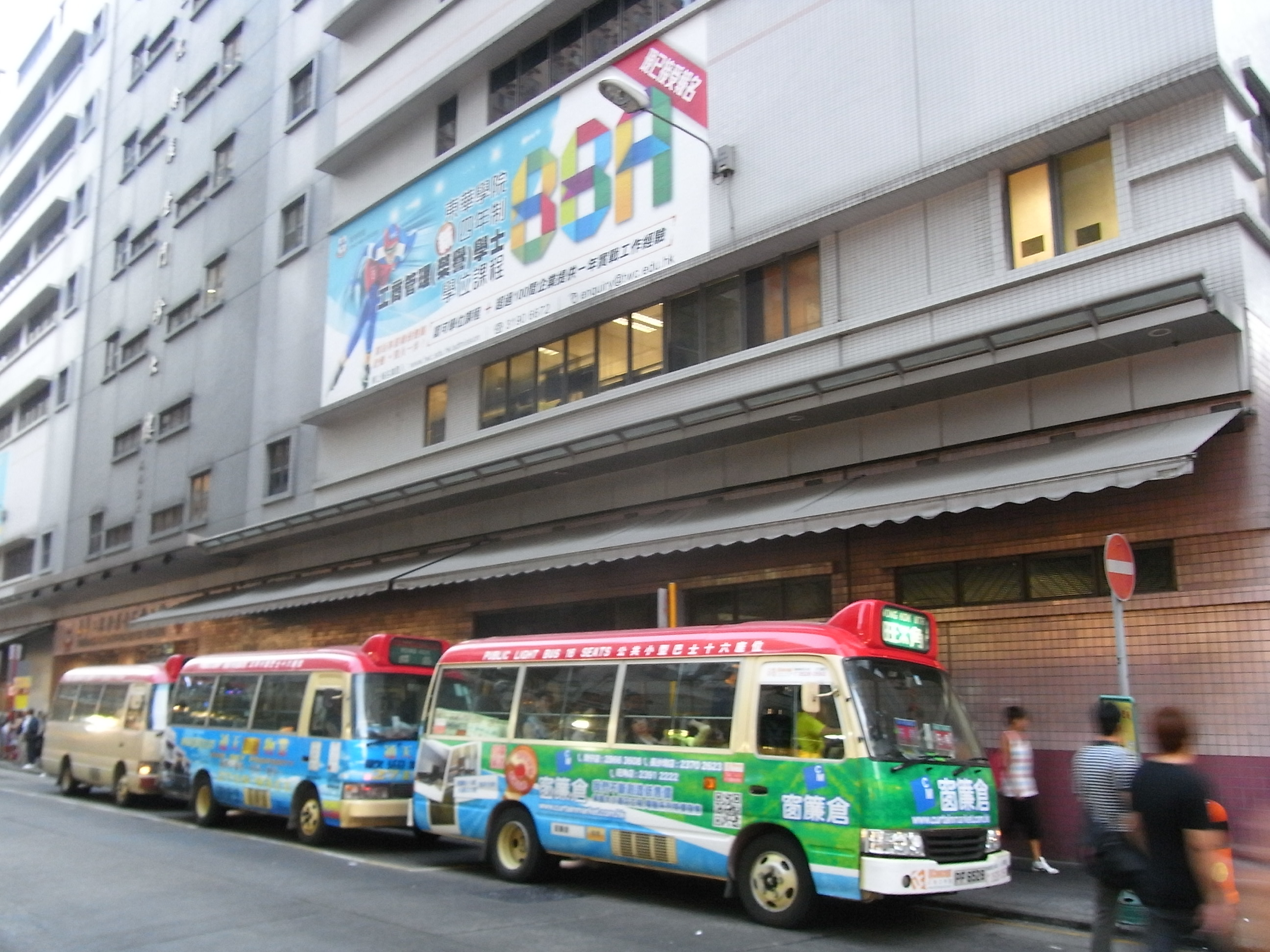
Idle mini buses in Mong Kok.

Similarly, Legislator Kitson Yang questioned the effectiveness of time-based charging on easing tunnel congestion during rush hour. Citing that many citizens would not deliberately go to work early or leave late just to avoid the congestion of peak hours, much less have the flexibility to choose their working hours, Yang argued that reduced tolls would do little to prompt drivers to commute at non-peak hours.

However, Lam Sai-hung, Head of the Transport and Logistics Bureau, proposed a different view. He believed that since commuters could save up to $40 per round trip by opting to travel at an earlier hour, saving up to "the value of a breakfast" in a day, there was a definite economic incentive for citizens to travel at non-peak hours. Moreover, he also suggested that this would not be as hard to accomplish as envisioned by some legislators, such as by arriving earlier at the workplace and having breakfast there instead.

=== Commencement date of Phase II ===
Under the original plan, Phase II of the new Pricing Scheme was set to commence on December 10, which coincided with the first Election Day of the reformed District Councils. Following an announcement that delayed the start of the Scheme to December 17, some public figures have suspected that there was a political motive behind the delay. According to the editorial page of the Hong Kong Economic Journal, some pro-establishment candidates in the District Council elections were worried that there would be traffic confusion on the new pricing scheme's first day of implementation, which could dissuade citizens from traveling to vote. Therefore, they had likely lobbied the government into delaying the launch of the pricing scheme.

Yet both the relevant government departments and pro-establishment politicians denied that this was the case. According to the Transport and Logistics Bureau's official explanation, the delay was to ensure that the government would have sufficient time to promote the new pricing scheme before it came into effect. Meanwhile, Chairperson of the Legislative Council's Panel on Transport Ben Chan refused to make "wild guesses" regarding the true intent behind the delay, though he conceded that the adjustment could be useful in preventing confusion on Election Day.

=== Policy rigidity and impact ===
Although congestion has posed a significant issue for years, some believe that the government should not resort to expediting decision-making processes and imposing unpopular policies. Democratic Party lawmaker Lam Cheuk-ting argued that different toll adjustment plans should be made available for scholars, lawmakers, and the public to choose from before its actual implementation. Assuming a non-negotiable approach to addressing problems, no matter how urgent, has been considered ineffective in an environment where public consultation plays a crucial role in achieving the desired outcome.

DAB lawmaker Ben Chan also raised concerns about congestion in all three tunnels. Because the plan aims to redirect traffic toward the Western Harbour Crossing and consequently take up its maximum capacity, it would eventually regress congestion back to its original state. Both aforementioned Frankie Yick and Michael Tien also agree that the scheme's impact would be minimal since incremental toll changes are not enough to divert traffic or affect driver behavior, risking the return of the exact same traffic patterns a year from implementation.

Some even believe that changing tunnel tolls is ultimately less effective than decreasing the number of private cars in Hong Kong, the main culprit of road congestion. Instead of focusing on electronic road pricing, the government has been urged to consider alternative transport policies like stricter licensing for private cars to discourage overuse. In fact, the number of private cars has increased by almost 40% in the last decade, amounting to approximately 657,000 in total by 2021. Thus, the toll scheme has been widely criticised for its lack of flexibility and long-term effect on the diversion of traffic in Hong Kong.

=== Lack of efficacy of "small-government" principle ===
Ever since the early 2000s, some political parties had been pressuring the government to take strong action to alleviate the traffic congestion. For instance, the Democratic Party suggested in 2003 that the government buy back ownership of the three tunnels and place them under the unified control of a new government department. By doing so, the government could freely dictate the tolls for all three tunnels, and thus share the traffic burden with the under-used Western Harbour Crossing as well. However, these proposals were repeatedly rejected by the government on the grounds that this would conflict with the longstanding principle of "small government," not to mention make the government structure more cumbersome and expensive.
