= Surapong Piyachote =

- สุรพงษ์ ปิยะโชติ
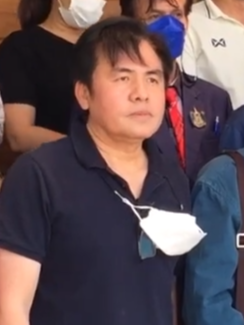

Deputy Minister of Transport
- Incumbent
- Assumed office 1 September 2023 Serving with Monporn Charoensri
- Prime Minister: Srettha Thavisin; Paetongtarn Shinawatra
- Minister: Suriya Juangroongruangkit

Surapong Piyachote (Thai: สุรพงษ์ ปิยะโชติ, RTGS: Suraphong Piyachot) is a Thai politician, serving as Deputy Minister of Transport since 2023.

== 2024 Election Commission complaint ==
Following his September 2024 appointment to the Paetongtarn Cabinet, serial petitioner Ruangkrai Leekitwattana filed a complaint with the Election Commission of Thailand against Prime Minister Paetongtarn Shinawatra for appointing Surapong, alleging he was linked to corruption. Leekitwattana cited Surapong's participation in the Kanchanaburi Provincial Administrative Organisation (PAO) election in 2020, where a person was convicted of vote buying—reportedly on Piyachote's behalf. In 2012, the Election Commission dismissed a previous vote buying complaint against Surapong.

== Congestion pricing in Bangkok ==
Surapong is overseeing the planning for congestion pricing in Bangkok. He has defended the ministry's proposals to ensure the pricing plan is accountable and does not benefit businesses or investors.
