= Electronic road pricing (Hong Kong) =

Proposed toll for vehicles in Hong Kong

Electronic road pricing (ERP, Chinese: 電子道路收費系統) is an electronic toll collection scheme first proposed in Hong Kong as early as in the 1980s to manage traffic by congestion pricing. (Singapore, which first adopted ERP in 1998, was the first city in the world to implement electronic congestion pricing.)

Hong Kong first conducted a pilot test on the electronic road pricing system between 1983 and 1985 with positive results, but when it tried to implement an actual electronic road pricing, it failed because of public opposition. The study also included a simulation of the Singapore Area Licensing Scheme, a 12-hour toll collecting system enforced manually implemented in 1975, and itself also a world pioneering effort as the first practical implementation of congestion pricing ever. However, public opposition against Hong Kong ERP stalled its permanent implementation.

== Current developments ==
Studies conducted in the 1990s and the opposition towards further reclamation of the Victoria Harbour recently has led to advocates of the ERP as a possible alternative for road management. Thomas Chow, Deputy Secretary for the Environment, Transport and Works, noted, however, that the Central-Wan Chai Bypass, to be built on the reclaimed land, is still needed because the ERP works best if an alternative road system is available, citing the Singapore and London experiences whereby the systems were only implemented after bypasses and alternative routes were available.

== See also ==
- Road pricing
- Congestion pricing
- Milan Area C
- Electronic toll collection
- Electronic Road Pricing (Singapore)
- London congestion charge
- Singapore Area Licensing Scheme
- Stockholm congestion tax
