= Congestion pricing in Bangkok =

In October 2024, Thailand's Ministry of Transport announced plans to implement congestion pricing on drivers entering roads in inner Bangkok. Bangkok is among the most congested cities in the world, with navigation-device maker TomTom NV's 2019 global congestion index ranking it 11th. In 2023, Bangkok was ranked 46th on the global congestion index. The city also experiences high levels of air pollution.

== Early plans ==
In 1971, the World Bank-funded Bangkok Transportation Study proposed restriction on vehicle usage and ownership, but was not implemented.

This fee was most recently proposed in 2022, following a pre-feasibility study that lasted from 2019 to 2022 in conjunction with German development agency Deutsche Gesellschaft für Internationale Zusammenarbeit and Thai transport authorities. The study proposed charging fees ranging from 50 to 120 baht across various city zones.

== Current proposal ==
Transport Minister Suriya Juangroongruangkit proposed a 40-50 baht congestion charge to fund a 20 baht maximum flat fare for all electric rail lines in the greater Bangkok region. Juangroongruangkit suggested the pricing scheme would be modeled after successful programs in other cities, including London. Governor of Bangkok Chadchart Sittipunt announced his support for the proposal, and advocated for an expansion of the city's rail and bus network. The Office of Transport and Traffic Policy and Planning (OTP) is analyzing similar schemes in other cities.

The charge is planned for roads with electric rail lines, including Sukhumvit, Silom, and Ratchadaphisek roads. The ministry plans to spend six months to a year to conduct a study of the plan, expected to be completed by mid-2025.

== Opposition ==
The People's Party, Thailand's main opposition party, opposes the government's congestion pricing plan, advocating instead for prioritizing building a comprehensive public transport network. People's Party MP Surachet Praweewongwut argued that argued that the current transport system is not adequate in terms of convincing motorists to switch to transit.

On 24 October 2024, People's Party MP for Bangkok Suphanat Meenchainan suggested the government should prioritize public bus networks, rather than congestion fees that would benefit private train operators. He also questioned if the Ministry of Transport would be able to reform the mass transit system within the promised six months. Deputy Minister of Transport Surapong Piyachote responded that the ministry is working to increase accountability, adding the fee would not benefit investors or businesses.

== See also ==
- Rail transport in Bangkok
- Mass Rapid Transit Master Plan in Bangkok Metropolitan Region
