= Road space rationing in Beijing =

Transport regulation in Beijing, China

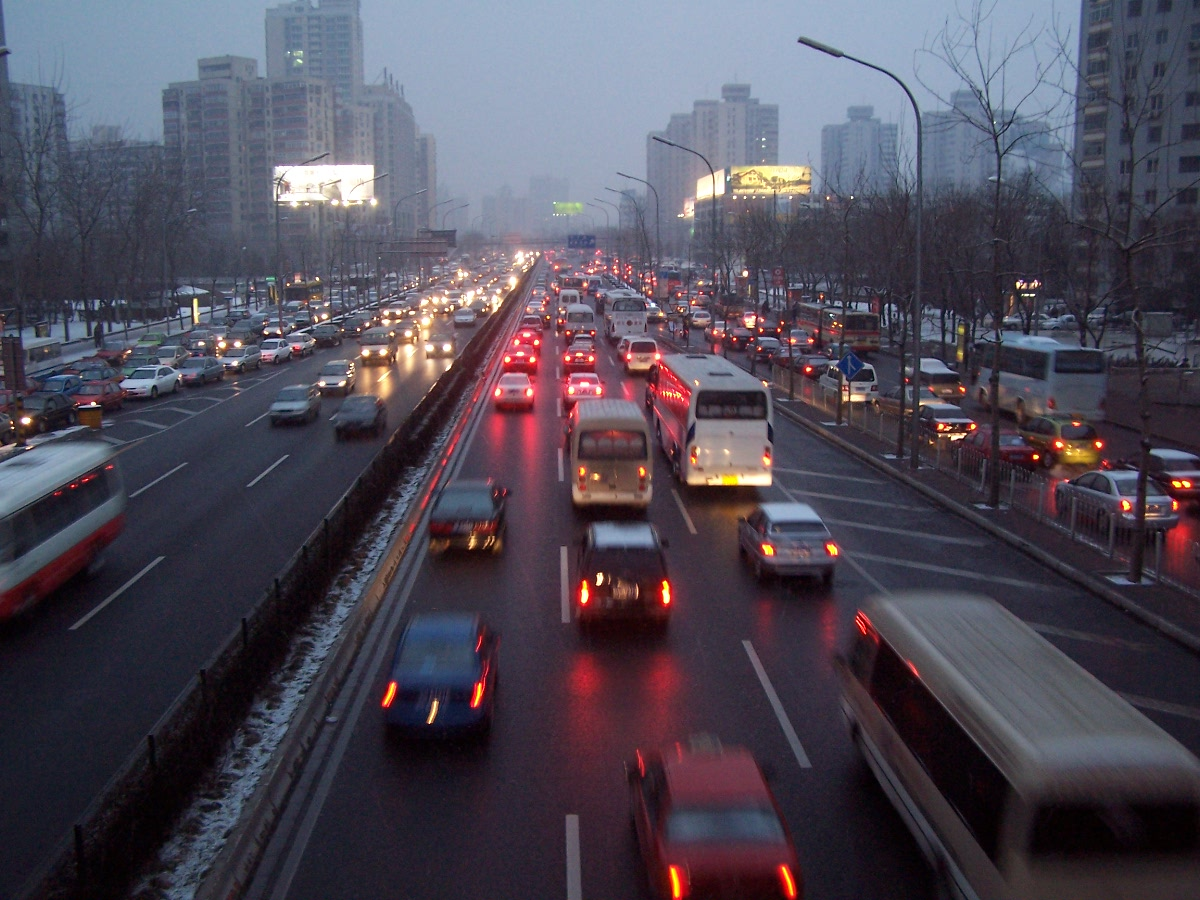
Traffic Jam in Beijing

Road space rationing in Beijing was introduced in the city in a permanent basis after successful results obtained with the policy during the 2008 Summer Olympics. Road space rationing or driving restriction is a transportation demand management regulation aimed to reduce traffic by restricting automobile travel through means such as restriction of cars that could enter common road space based upon the last digits of the license number on certain established days during certain periods in Beijing. The main objective of this restraint policy in Beijing is to reduce the amount of exhaust gas generated by motor vehicles.

Also as part of the smog alert system put in place in the city in 2013, once a red alert is issued, a temporary driving restriction is imposed for the duration of the severe pollution event to reduce the city's cars on the streets by half. Temporary restrictions have been implemented in Beijing twice in December 2015, and one more time in December 2016.

Many road space rationing regulations, such as the even-odd license plate policy, yellow label car policy, end-number policy and passenger car purchase policy have been established in Beijing since the 2008 Summer Olympics. These policies are enforced by traffic enforcement cameras that are able to recognize license plates of automobiles and the police, where the cameras and policemen could recognize license plates of cars that should not be on the road during a certain day, and when found out, the driver of the car would receive certain penalties. Although there have been a significant improvement in the air quality of Beijing and the road space availability, many negative responses of the city's car owners were received.

== 2008 Beijing Olympics road space rationing ==
A 40% daily reduction of vehicle emissions was reported after comparing the data for vehicle emissions before and after the following policy was carried out. These policies successfully lowered the mean surface temperature by 1.5–2.4 °C and reduced heat extent by 820 km2 in Beijing.

=== Odd-even license plate policy ===
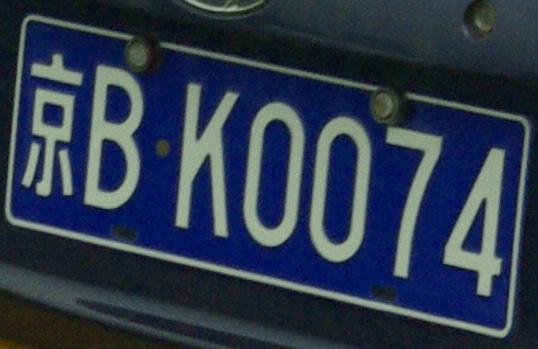
This car has an even end number, therefore it could not go on public road space every other day.

On July 20, 2008, Beijing implemented a temporary road space rationing policy, odd-even rationing policy, by allowing cars that have an even last number of their license plates to be able to drive on roads in one day while the cars that have an odd last number of their license plates could go on the road the next day in order to improve air quality in the city during the 2008 Summer Olympics. This policy does not affect taxis, public buses, yellow-plate vehicles (vehicles with more than 9 seats inclusive), police vehicles and military vehicles.

== Post-Beijing Olympics road space rationing ==
Due to the success in improving Beijing's air quality and the increased road space availability, the Beijing Traffic Management Bureau issued a series of road space rationing policies to maintain road space availability after the 2008 Beijing Olympics.

=== End-number license plate policy ===
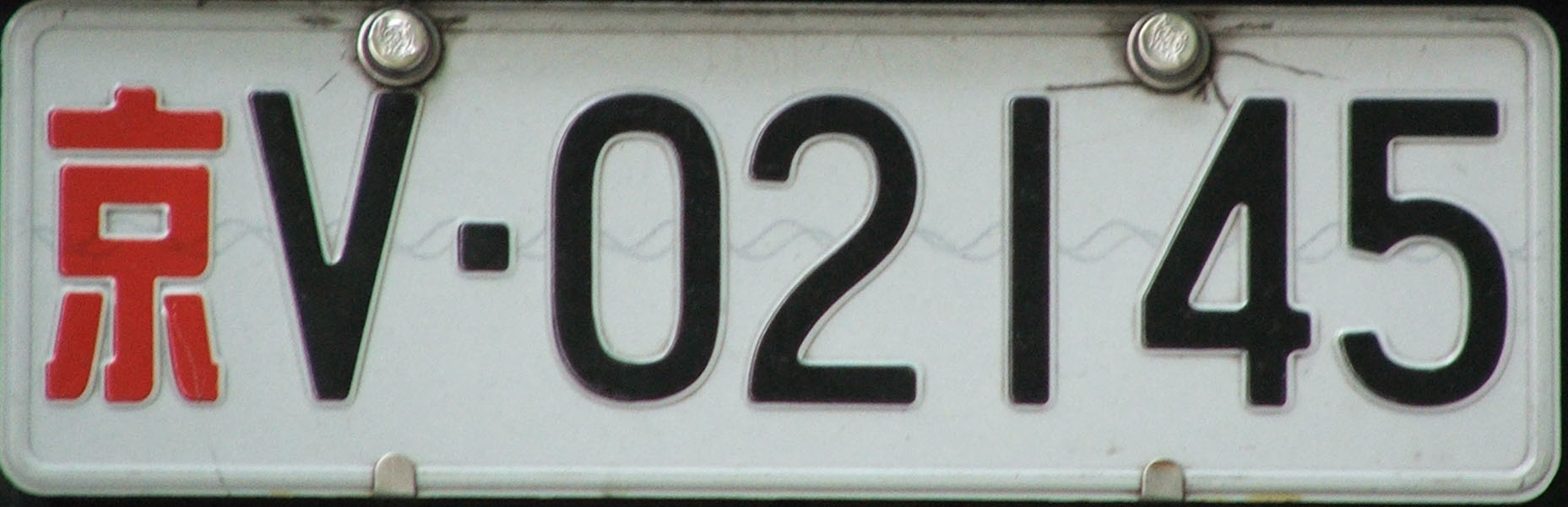
Military vehicles that have white license plates are not ruled by any of the policies.

On September 28, 2008, the Beijing Traffic Management Bureau issued a 'Notice on the Implementation of Traffic Management Measures', which stated that from October 11, 2008 to January 10, 2009, automobiles in Beijing city (inside the 5th Ring Road) shall cease going on public roads for one day per week by means of grouping by the end number of the license plates of automobiles: from Monday to Friday, automobiles with end numbers 1 or 6, 2 or 7, 3 or 8, 4 or 9, 5 or 0 respectively would cease going on public road space. License plates ending with English letters are categorized as 0. The automobiles that are not allowed on public road space during a weekday are not allowed to be inside the 5th ring road (inclusive) from 07:00 to 20:00 Beijing time. If the policy is violated, car owners would be fined ¥200. For every three months, the automobiles that could not go on public road space for a certain weekday would rotate.

=== Yellow-label car policy ===
Yellow-label cars are automobiles that have yellow-stickers that indicate the vehicles are not qualified for the emission levels ‘国I’ for gasoline cars and '国III' for diesel cars on their windshields. Since January 1, 2009, a yellow-label car restriction policy was imposed, which prohibited the entrance of yellow-cars into the 5th Ring Road of Beijing.

=== Pollution red alert ===
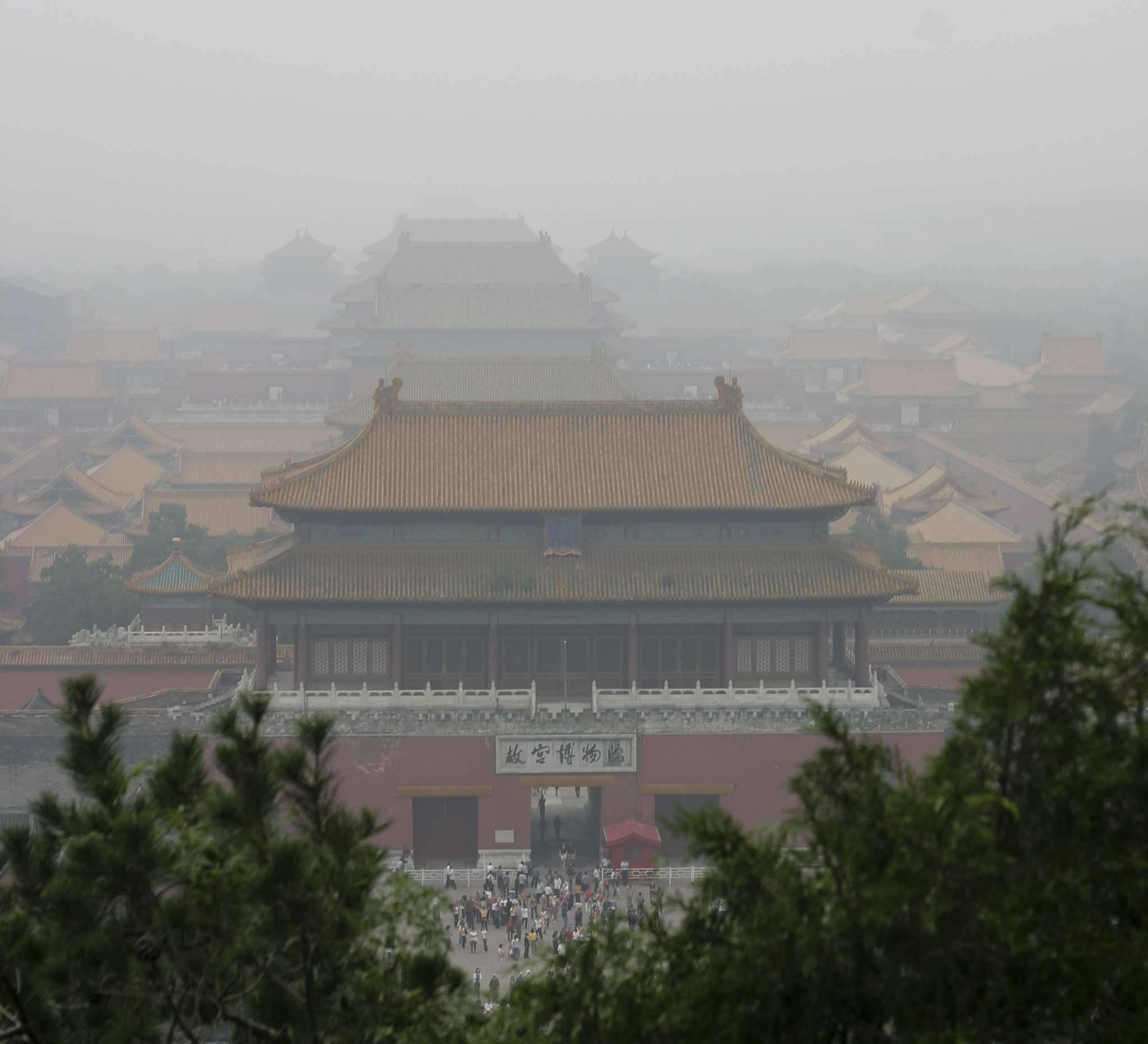
Smog over Beijing's Forbidden City.

Temporary driving restrictions were imposed in Beijing from December 8 to 10, 2015, as part of the smog mitigation measures provided for in Beijing's red alert for hazardous smog, the first such alert issued ever. The smog alert system was put in place in 2013, and a red alert should go into effect if there is a prediction that the air quality index will stay over 200 for more than 72 hours. On the evening of December 7 the index was 253 according to Beijing's authorities. Under a red alert half of the city's cars are ordered off the streets through a temporary alternate-day travel scheme based on the cars license plate numbers. Only cars with even-numbered license plates were allowed on the roads during the first day of the restriction. Electric cars are not subject to the driving restriction, as a government incentive to promote the use of cleaner vehicles.

According to the Ministry of Environmental Protection, the combined effect of all the restrictions imposed reduced pollutant emissions in Beijing by 30% during day one of the city's first red alert for smog. Environmentalist from Beijing University of Technology estimated that without the measures, the density of PM_{2.5} would have risen by 10% during that time period.

A second red alert for pollution was issued on December 18, 2015. Temporary driving restrictions were imposed for four days, beginning at 7 a.m. on December 19 and ending on the 23rd at midnight.

On 16 December 2016, Beijing authorities declared a five-day pollution “red alert” due to a heavy pollution event. Among other measures, about half the cars were restricted through a temporary alternate-day travel scheme, and older and “dirty” high-emissions vehicles were forbidden to circulate. Public transport services in the city were increased, with about 3,600 buses on duty. The Ministry of Environmental Protection reported that 21 other cities across north and central China had also declared pollution red alerts, including Tianjin, Shijiazhuang, Taiyuan, and Zhengzhou. The red alert was lifted on 22 December 2016 as the winds cleared pollution away the night before.

== Small passenger car purchase policy ==
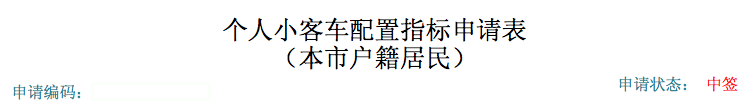
Granted quota of the 'Small Passenger Car Purchase Policy' to small passenger car buyer. Application number is blocked.

Starting from January 1, 2012, Beijing citizens who wish to purchase passenger cars with less than five seats must follow the small passenger car purchase policy to be applicable for purchasing a passenger car. According to the policy, the individual purchaser must not already have a passenger car registered under his or her name, and must fulfill various requirements such as having a driving license and living in Beijing; if the purchaser fulfills all of the requirements, he or she could apply for a quota for a passenger by entering the information pertaining to being applicable at the 'Beijing Small Passenger Car Passenger Quota Management' website, and then wait for the monthly license plate 'lottery' (摇号), where during the 26th of every month the Traffic Management Bureau would take all of the eligible quotas and select a certain amount of them randomly similar to the way of lottery where numbers are drawn randomly. Companies are also applicable to following the policy, but under a different set of rules. Car owners who scrapped their cars could produce evidence and receive a quota without going through the process of license plate 'lottery'.

== Effects of the policies ==
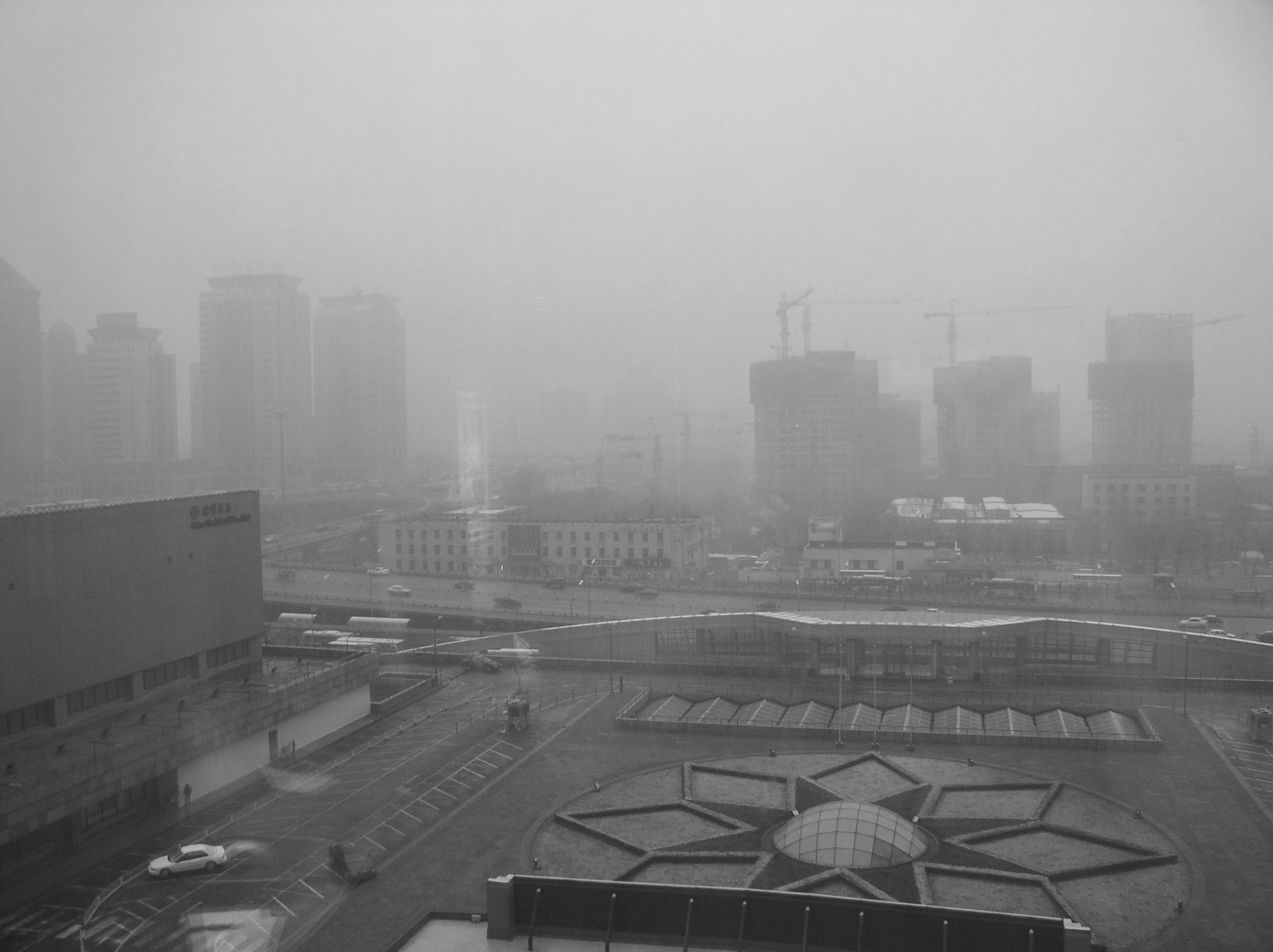
High pollution day in Beijing

According to a third party test, the policies issued were effective in reducing the car emissions: a 40% daily reduction of vehicle emissions was reported after comparing the data for vehicle emissions before and after the following policy was carried out. Also, according to a professor in the Beijing University of Technology, the End-number License Plate Policy has reduced the number of cars on the public road-space of Beijing by 700,000, but with the rapidly increasing number of cars purchased, the effects of the policy would be negated within three years.

== Reception of policies ==
According to a survey ordered by the officials conducted by a third party institute in 2010, 90.4% of the surveyed people are in favor of end-number license plate policy and would like to continue practicing the policy, but according to a similar survey conducted by Sina.com 82.9% of the interviewed opposed the End-number License Plate Policy, with only 14% in favor, having a 76% difference from the official survey.

== Other Chinese cities ==
As of June 2016, in addition to Beijing, another 11 Chinese cities have similar restriction schemes in place.

In Guangzhou, vehicles with plates not bearing the prefix 粤A(vehicles registered in Guangzhou) are allowed to drive for 4 days consecutively. Vehicles caught operating beyond the allowed 4 days are subject to fines.

== See also ==
- Congestion pricing
- Low-emission zone
- New energy vehicles in China
- Odd-even rationing
- Road pricing
- Road space rationing
- Vehicle registration plates of China
