= Road space rationing =

Travel demand management strategy

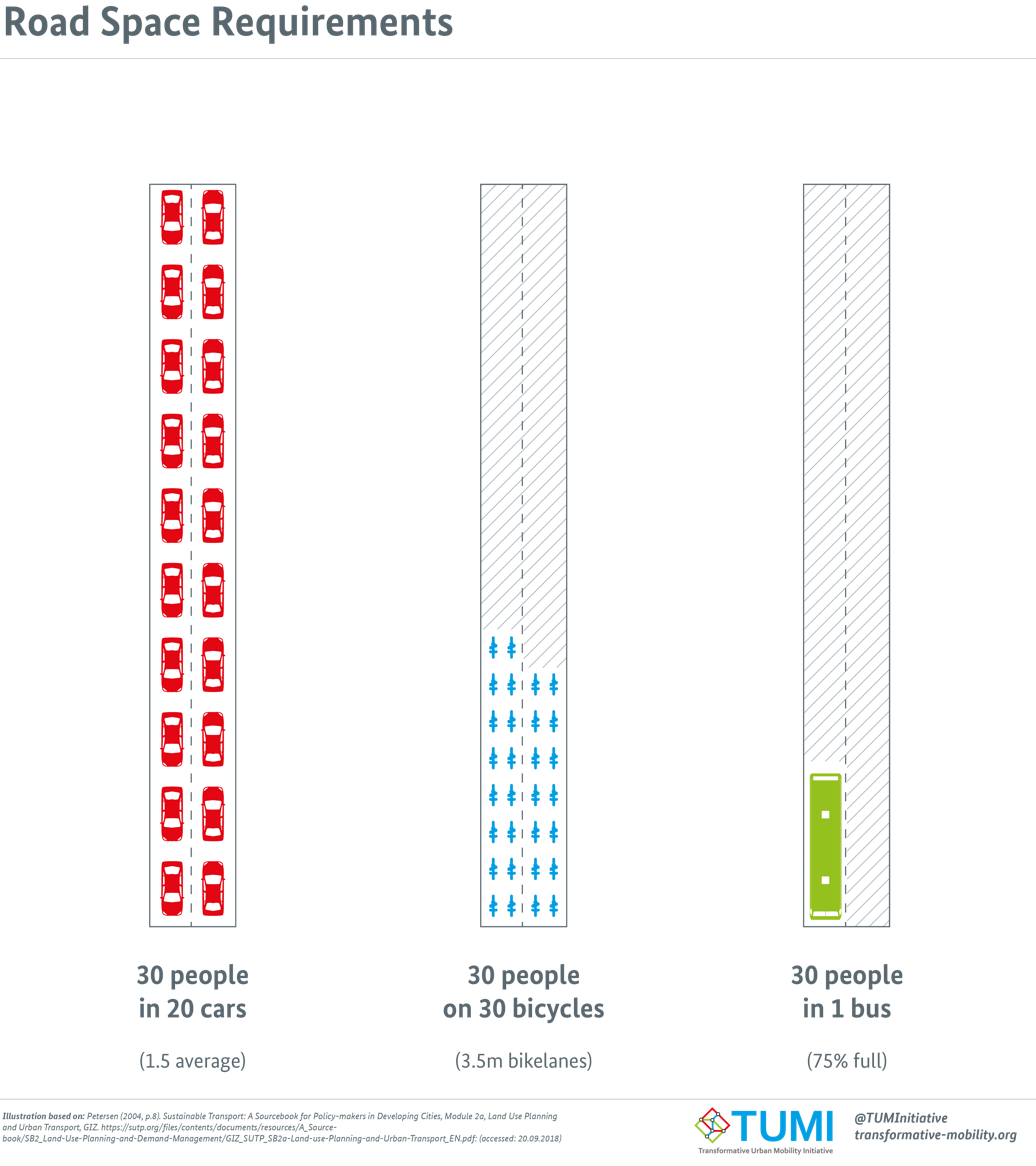
Road space requirements for 30 people in 20 cars (left) compared to 30 people on bicycles (middle) and 30 people in a single bus (right)

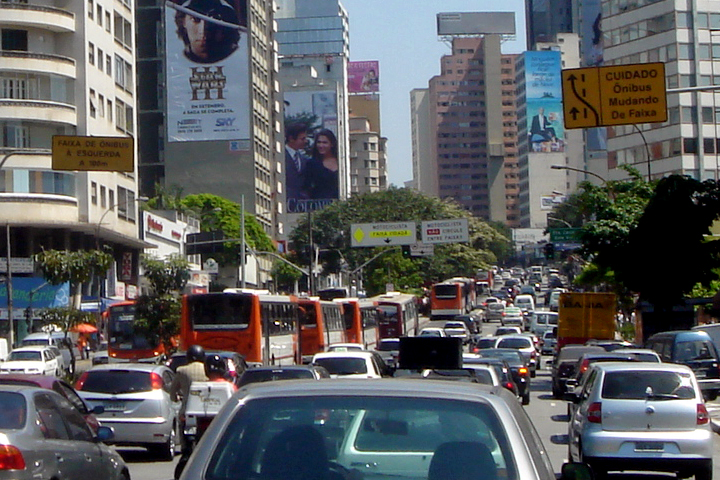
Traffic congestion persists despite São Paulo's municipal no-drive days based on license numbers, implemented since 1997. São Paulo downtown, Brazil.

Road space rationing, also known as alternate-day travel, driving restriction, no-drive days and number coding (Spanish: restricción vehicular; Portuguese: rodízio veicular; French: circulation alternée), is a travel demand management strategy aimed to reduce the negative externalities generated by urban air pollution or peak urban travel demand in excess of available supply or road capacity, through artificially restricting demand (vehicle travel) by rationing the scarce common good road capacity, especially during the peak periods or during peak pollution events. This objective is achieved by restricting traffic access into an urban cordon area, city center (central business district), or district based upon the last digits of the vehicle registration plate on pre-established days and during certain periods, usually the peak hours.

The practical implementation of this traffic restraint policy is common in Latin America. The main goal of road space rationing is often reduced air pollution, such as the cases of México City, and Santiago, Chile. São Paulo, with a fleet of 6 million vehicles in 2007, is the largest metropolis in the world with such a travel restriction, implemented first in 1996 as measured to mitigate air pollution, and thereafter made permanent in 1997 to relieve traffic congestion. More recent implementations in Costa Rica and Honduras have had the objective of reducing oil consumption, due to the high impact this import has on the economy of small countries, and considering the steep increases in oil prices that began in 2003. Bogotá, Quito, and La Paz, Bolivia also have similar driving restriction schemes in place.

After a temporary implementation of road space rationing to reduce air pollution in Beijing during the 2008 Summer Olympics, local officials put in place several permanent rationing schemes to improve the city's air quality. As of June 2016, another 11 Chinese cities have similar restriction schemes in place. Also, temporary driving restrictions to reduce cars on the streets by half during severe pollution events have been implemented in Paris and surrounding suburbs in March 2014, March 2015, and December 2016; in Beijing twice in December 2015, and one more time in December 2016; and also in Rome and Milan for several days in December 2015. A similar alternate-day travel temporary scheme was implemented in New Delhi as a two-week trial in January 2016. A temporary ban on diesel cars was implemented in Oslo on municipal roads in January 2017.

== Historical background ==
The earliest known implementation of road space rationing took place in Ancient Rome, as carriages and carts pulled by horses created serious congestion problems in several Roman cities. In 45 B.C. Julius Caesar declared the center of Rome off-limits between 6 a.m. and 4 p.m. to all vehicles except for carriages transporting priests, officials, visitors, and high-ranking citizens.

== Effectiveness ==
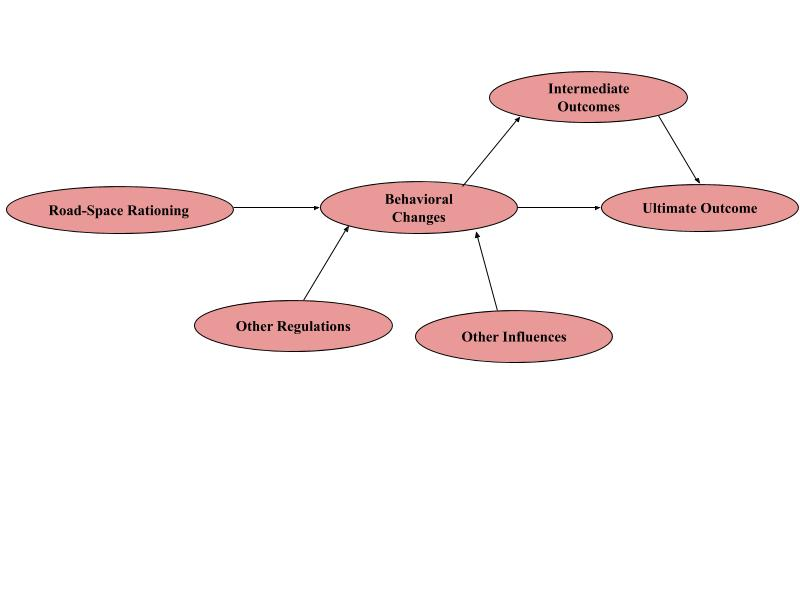
Road Space Rationing impacts behavioral changes and may lead to the ultimate outcome, i.e. end traffic congestion. Other factors impacting these changes make it hard to isolate the singular effects of Road Space Rationing regulations.

Schemes rationing access based on number plate have mixed results. If used infrequently or temporarily the alternate-day travel policy can have some impact. However, if used as a long term measure, inequality issues might arise, as wealthier people can afford to own two cars with opposite-parity number plates, to circumvent any restrictions, with the second vehicle being often older and therefore more polluting. Cities such as Tehran which have used such schemes are now looking to more sustainable methods of traffic and emissions control, such as low emission zone or traffic limited zones as used in Europe. Access regulations have often been found to be effective, in reducing congestion, traffic and pollution.

The program's impact on moving behavior to more sustainable transport methods is also unclear. Evaluations on the effectiveness of road space rationing regulations focus mainly on whether there is a decrease in the usage of the less sustainable vehicles for which the schemes were implemented in the first place. They do not focus on whether there is a change in the pattern in which such vehicles are used. For example, evaluations examine how many people stop using a polluting car. They do not evaluate how many people start riding bicycles or carpool as a result of such schemes.

=== Evaluating effectiveness ===
It is important to better understand the effectiveness of the regulatory policies intended to reduce traffic congestion to improve their implementation in the future. Some factors that hinder the effective program evaluation of policies like road space rationing are that transportation demand management strategies are often implemented as a part of other broader policies. It is difficult to separate the effects of such methods from the other methods they are associated with. Most measures are taken at the beginning and during the implementation of a strategy. Not enough evaluation is conducted after strategy implementation. In developing countries, data insufficiency hinders the formation of generalizable conclusions on the effectiveness of a strategy. It is hard to outline a cause and effect relationship between the regulation that is implemented and the change in behavior it creates or general effect it has. Many factors could cause a change in the behavior of individuals affected by the regulation at hand. It could be the direct result of that regulation or the result of other existing regulations, and societal effects. Given that such programs are not usually implemented in isolation, singular conclusions on the effectiveness of regulations impacting traffic congestion are difficult to form.

Three methods can be employed to measure the effectiveness of regulatory policies. The first measure, administration evaluation, examines how road space rationing is delivered and enforced to the target audience. The second measure, behavioral evaluation, focuses on the extent to which the regulation changes the behavior of the target audience. The third measure, outcome performance, analyzes the outcomes of the regulation. To collect information on these measures, direct observation, stated preferences surveys, and revealed preference surveys can be conducted. These methods can be conducted in isolation or simultaneously to procure rich data. The problems associated with these methods are observer bias in direct observation, the spread of misinformation when respondents are untruthful, and excess time consumption.

== Applications of road space rationing ==
=== Permanent alternate-day travel schemes ===
Road space rationing based on license numbers has been implemented in cities such as Athens (1982), Santiago, Chile (1986 and extended 2001), México City (1989), Metro Manila (1995), São Paulo (1997), Bogotá, Colombia (1998), La Paz, Bolivia (2003), San José, Costa Rica, (2005) countrywide in Honduras (2008), and Quito, Ecuador (2010). All these cities restrain a percentage of vehicles every weekday during rush hours or for the entire day. When the restriction is based in two digits a theoretical 20% reduction of traffic is expected. Cities with serious air quality problems, such as México City and Santiago use more digits to achieve greater reductions in air pollution, and even the prohibition can be for more than one day a week. In Bogotá, Colombia from 2009 the plate restriction was extended from peak periods to the whole day (from 06:00 to 20:00 hours) in the whole city.

Bertrand Delanoë, the mayor of Paris, proposed to impose a complete ban on motor vehicles in the city's inner districts, with exemptions only for residents, businesses, and the disabled, as a three-part plan to implement during a seven-year period. This proposal was made in 2005, in the context of Paris' bid to host the 2012 Summer Olympics which ended up being won by London.

During the discussions regarding the proposal to introduce congestion pricing in New York, the commission created in 2007 by the New York State Legislature to evaluate other traffic relief options, considered road space rationing based on license plates as an alternative to congestion pricing. The proposal stalled in April 2008 as the legislature decided not to vote the proposed plan.

==== Athens ====
Rising traffic in Athens during the 1990s led to the development of the Dactylius (Greek: Δακτύλιος, romanized: Daktýlios, lit. 'ring') around central Athens. The Dactylius does not require drivers to pay in order to enter the areas subjected to the Dactylius' restrictions. Instead, the scheme depends on the parity of the date and of the vehicle's registration plate, the vehicle type as well as the time of the week/month. There are three Dactylius areas: The Inner, the Outer and the Green, each one with its own policies.

==== Bogotá ====
Then mayor Enrique Peñalosa, introduced in Bogotá, Colombia in 1998 a driving restriction program, "Pico y placa" (literally in Spanish: "peak and license plate") to reduce traffic congestion during rush hours. The system restricts traffic access into a pre-established urban area for vehicles with license plate numbers ending in certain digits on pre-established days and during certain hours based on the last digit of the licence plate numbers. Initially the system restricted traffic between 7:00 and 9:00 a.m. and between 5:30 and 7:30 p.m., Monday through Friday, for two days for each registered vehicle.

Then mayor Antanas Mockus extended the restriction for one hour in 2001. A complementary program called "El Pico y Placa Ambiental" (literally in Spanish: "environmental peak and license plate") was implemented by then mayor Luis Eduardo Garzón in 2006, expanding the restriction to public transportation vehicles, including both bus and taxi services. Four numbers were restricted every day for private use vehicles, and two for public transportation vehicles. Since 2002 Bogotá's scheme switched the combinations of days and numbers every year, making it harder to circumvent the restriction by buying another car.

Starting in February 2009, then mayor Samuel Moreno Rojas extended the restriction from 6 a.m. to 8 p.m., Monday through Friday. This extension was issued as a temporary measure until public works related with the Transmilenio BRT were completed. In July 2012, then mayor Gustavo Petro reduced the hours of the restriction from 14 to 7 hours per day, to restrict access only between 6:00 and 8:30 a.m. and between 3:00 and 7:30 p.m. In addition, five neighborhoods were released from the restriction, Usme, Rafael Uribe Uribe, Tunjuelito, San Cristóbal and Ciudad Bolívar. Also, under the modified scheme five ending numbers are restricted every day between Monday and Friday, license plated ending on odd-numbers are restricted on odd-days of the month, and even-numbers on even-days.

Since December 2014, exempted vehicles include passenger cars with three or more passengers including the driver; properly registered vehicles for use by people with disabilities; all-electric vehicles; emergency vehicles, such police cars, ambulances, and fire trucks; properly identified public utilities vehicles, traffic control and towing vehicles; school buses; motorcycles; cash-in-transit armored vehicles; funeral vehicles; and press, judiciary, diplomatic, presidential motorcade, and security escort vehicles.

Similar schemes with the same name have been implemented in several Colombian cities, including Armenia, Barranquilla, Bucaramanga, Cali, Cartagena, Manizales, Medellín, and Pereira.

==== Jakarta ====
Road space rationing in Jakarta is known as Ganjil Genap (meaning "even and odd" in Indonesian). This policy imitates what has been done in Beijing during the Olympics. Police enforce rationing at the entrances of designated avenues and expressways. A car with an even license plate (for example, "B 1000 LA", the obsolete plate of Idris Sardi car) is allowed to pass on "even days", but will be fined when they enter that road on "odd days". Drivers might get even/odd days information from social media or radio stations. The Ganjil Genap policy was first implemented on Sudirman Avenue on 27 July 2016, taking the place of the previous "3-in-1 policy" (high vehicle occupancy), terminated by former Jakarta Governor Basuki Tjahaja Purnama (or Ahok) on 16 May 2016.

In 2018, Ganjil Genap was expanded to expressways bound to suburban areas (Jabodetabek), being enforced at Bekasi, Cibubur (at the border of Jakarta and Depok) and Tangerang toll booths. Only overcrowded toll booths apply this ban. Existing Ganjil Genap in Jakarta was extended from 6 am starts from 23 April 2018.

"3-in-1" was in force for 12 1/2 years (23 December 2003 – 16 May 2016), prohibiting vehicles with less than 3 passengers from certain roads. Basuki opted for this policy's removal citing car jockeys that plagued the policy's success, as well as how jockeying often led to exploitation of children. Police authorities also admitted that enforcement of 3-in-1 was harder than checking license plates, especially given the prevalence of car jockeying.

==== Mexico City ====
Mexico City started in November 1989 its driving restriction program, "Hoy no Circula" (literally in Spanish: "today [your car] does not circulate", known as "No-drive days"), which consisted of prohibiting the circulation of 20% of vehicles from Monday to Friday depending on the last digit of their license plates. Record levels of ozone and other airborne pollutants led the city government to implement the scheme. The program was planned to apply only during the winter, when air pollution is at its worst. Winter follows the rainy season when thermal inversion, an atmospheric condition which traps smog and pollution close to the ground, increases air pollution noticeably. However, the program was made permanent at the end of the 1990 winter season.

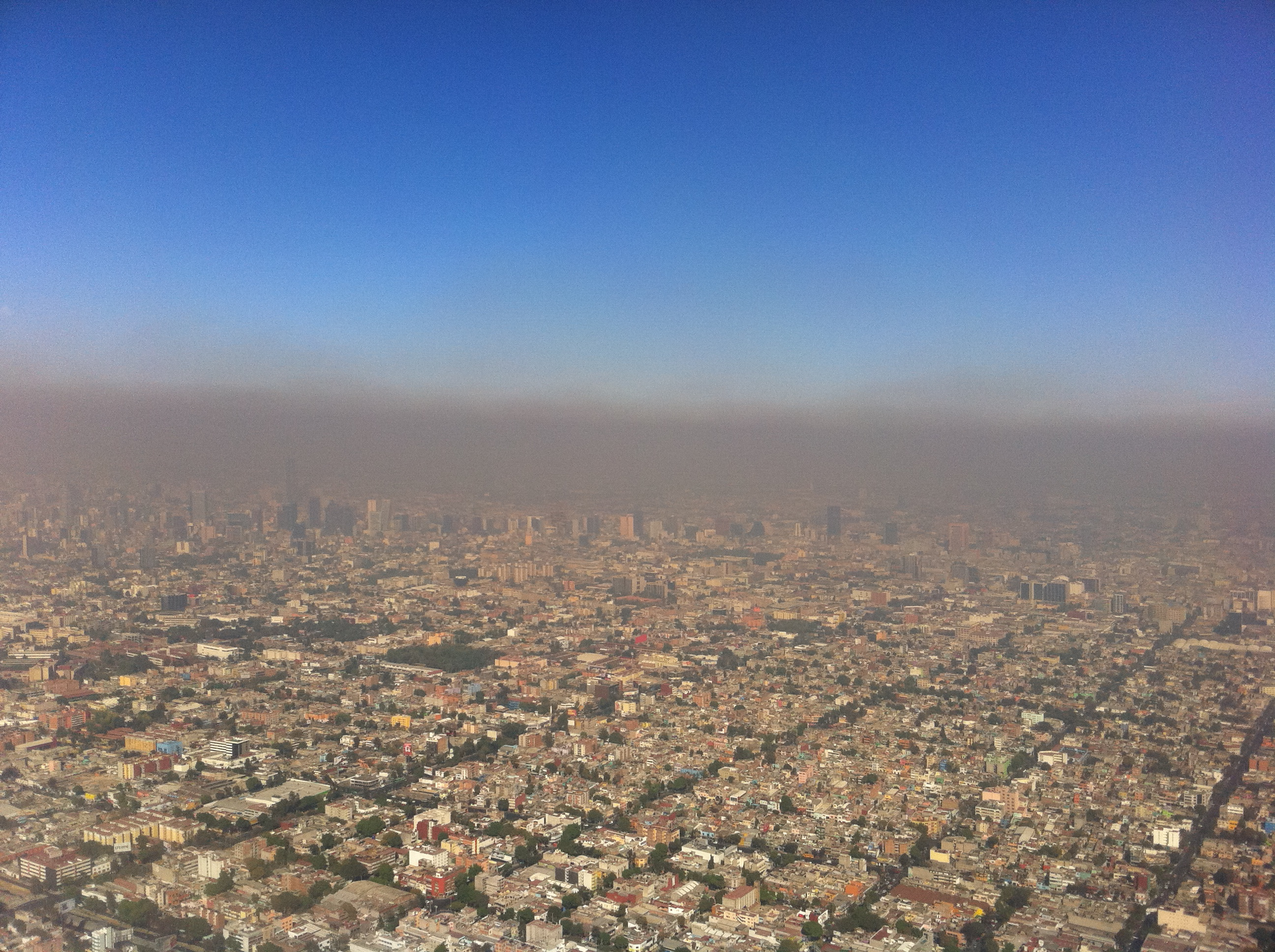
Severe smog over Mexico City.

The program is intended to improve the air quality of Mexico City. The restriction is based on the last digit of the license plate. Two numbers are restricted to travel every day from 5 a.m. to 10 p.m. The restrictions apply to the entire Mexico City metropolitan area, therefore, a similar coordinated program operates within the State of México, including the 18 neighboring municipalities which surrounds Mexico City on three sides: Atizapán de Zaragoza, Coacalco de Berriozabal, Cuautitlán, Cuautitlán Izcalli, Chalco, Chimalhuacan, Chicoloapan, Ecatepec de Morelos, Huixquilucan, Ixtapaluca, La Paz, Naucalpan de Juárez, Nezahualcóyotl, Nicolás Romero, Tecámac, Tlalnepantla de Baz, Tultitlán and Valle de Chalco Solidaridad.

Hoy No Circula is coupled with an exhaust monitoring program, known as "Verificación" in Spanish (verification), whereby a car's pollutant emissions are analyzed every six months. A colored sticker based on a vehicle's license plate number is affixed to each vehicle following an emissions test, indicating whether a vehicle is exempt from the program or not. Hybrid electric vehicles and electric vehicles are exempted. There are other restrictions that are applicable to non-local vehicles and foreigners. In June 2015, the Supreme Court of Justice of the Nation ruled in favor a constitutional challenge, and ordered that passenger cars with model year older than 2007 shall be restricted based on their actual tailpipe emissions, and not on how old the car is.

Taxis, buses, police cars, ambulances, fire trucks, commercial vehicles operating with liquid propane gas, and commercial vehicles transporting perishable goods are exempt. In 2008 the scheme in Mexico City was extended to limit driving into the city one Saturday every month, but only applies to cars that are more than 10-years old (sticker 2). Foreign-plated vehicles without emissions stickers are restricted all day every Saturday. Similar alternate-day travel restriction programs have been implemented in Pachuca, Puebla and Toluca.

The driving restriction program was initially successful in reducing pollution levels, as carbon monoxide (CO) fell by 11%. Compliance with the program is near universal. However, as the restriction was made permanent residents began buying second cars to get around the ban, usually used and old polluting cars. A 2008 study from the University of Michigan found that there is no evidence that the restrictions have improved air quality. Evidence from additional sources indicates that the restrictions led to an increase in the total number of vehicles in circulation and the long-term impact of the scheme on CO levels has been a 13% rise.

==== San José ====
An alternate-day travel scheme was introduced in San José, Costa Rica, in August 2005. The goal of the restriction program was to reduced oil consumption with the purpose of mitigating the negative effects of high international oil prices in the Costa Rican economy. The program was implemented when the price of an oil barrel was at US$65 up from US$20 in early 2003. Fuel and oil imports represented in 2007 a 5.6% of the country's GDP, up from 2% ten years earlier.

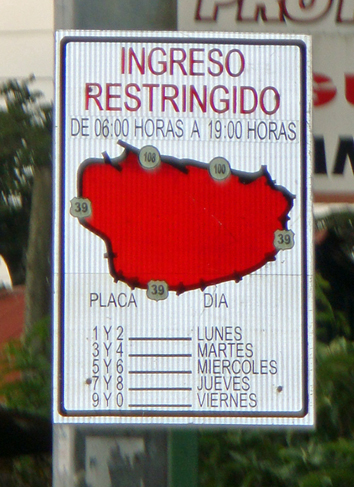
Traffic sign used in San José, Costa Rica, to warn drivers of the prevailing access restriction into the CBD according to license plate number by day of the week. An example is that 1 and 2 are banned on Mondays

Initially the driving restriction was applied to enter the capital's central business district and the scheme is based on the last number of the license plate, restricting two numbers per day, Monday through Friday. The travel restrictions were issued initially only during the rush hours, from 7:00 to 8:30 a.m. and 4:00-5:30 p.m.

In June 2008 the restricted cordon area was expanded until San José's Boulevard Circunvalación peripheral ring. The expansion aim was to attain further reductions in oil consumption, as oil prices continued to rise and reached US$130 per barrel in June 2008. Government official estimated that at this price, oil imports will reach US$2.85 billion, representing about a third of the country's export earnings and about 9% of the country's GDP estimated for 2008. As the implemented scheme only reduced fuel consumption by 5%, the government decided to expand the restriction hours beginning in July 2008. The road space rationing was expanded to 13 hours for passenger cars and light-duty commercial vehicles, from 6 a.m. through 7 p.m. Heavy-duty commercial vehicles were included in the restriction program but only during rush hours.

The alternate-day driving program was suspended in June 2009 as a result of a Constitutional Court ruling in favor a constitutional challenge. The court ruled that the policy infringed the constitutional freedom of movement right, and also that the economic sanctions for this violation were not supported by the existing legal framework. The temporary end of the program resulted in heavy traffic jams all over the city, as traffic volumes within the restricted cordon area increased by 20% to 25%. The driving restriction scheme was restored one month later by an Executive Decree based on amendments included in the Traffic Law passed by Congress in 2008. Nevertheless, this time the program was justified on San José's worsening traffic congestion levels instead of the economic impact of high oil prices.

Since October 2012 hybrid electric vehicles and all-electric cars are exempted from the driving restriction as part of Costa Rica's government policy to promote the use of clean energy in the country. As a result of multiple legal challenges, traffic engineering authorities decided to conduct periodic effectiveness evaluations of the program. Traffic authorities announced in October 2014 that the results of six studies found that the alternate-day travel restriction reduced the number of vehicles entering downtown San José every working day between 14% and 16%.

==== Santiago ====
Driving restrictions were introduced in Santiago in 1986, as a measure to mitigate Chile's capital high levels of air pollution. The scheme was based on the last number of the license plate. Two numbers are banned from entering the city between Monday and Friday. In 1992, Santiago reformed its program to adopt vintage-specific restrictions. These restrictions placed higher limits on old, more polluting cars and lower limits on new, less polluting cars. The 1992 reform led to a significant impact on the emissions created by local pollutants in Santiago. A price effect that favored less polluting car models was also seen. Households in localities facing restrictions owned more 1992 or older built vehicles without catalytic converter than households in localities that did not face restrictions. This reform highlights the effect of vintage-specific restrictions on fleet-composition. It does not provide information on how such a policy can be designed and how welfare is impacted by its implementation. It does not provide information on how such a policy can be designed and how welfare is impacted by its implementation.

Initially the restriction applied only to passenger vehicles without a catalytic converter with the aim to reduced particulate matter emissions. As of March 2018, the restriction applies to all cars built before 2012. During critical air pollution events, classified as alert, pre-emergency or emergency, the number of cars restricted to travel are increased by adding additional last number plates. Beginning with pre-emergency state, the restriction might include vehicles with catalytic converter. As the number of registered vehicles with the emission control device surpassed those without it, authorities decided in 2008 to increase the number of vehicles restricted to enter every day to the city, by increasing the restriction to the four last digits instead of the initial two. This scheme produces a theoretical reduction of 40% of vehicles entering the city on a work day.

==== São Paulo ====
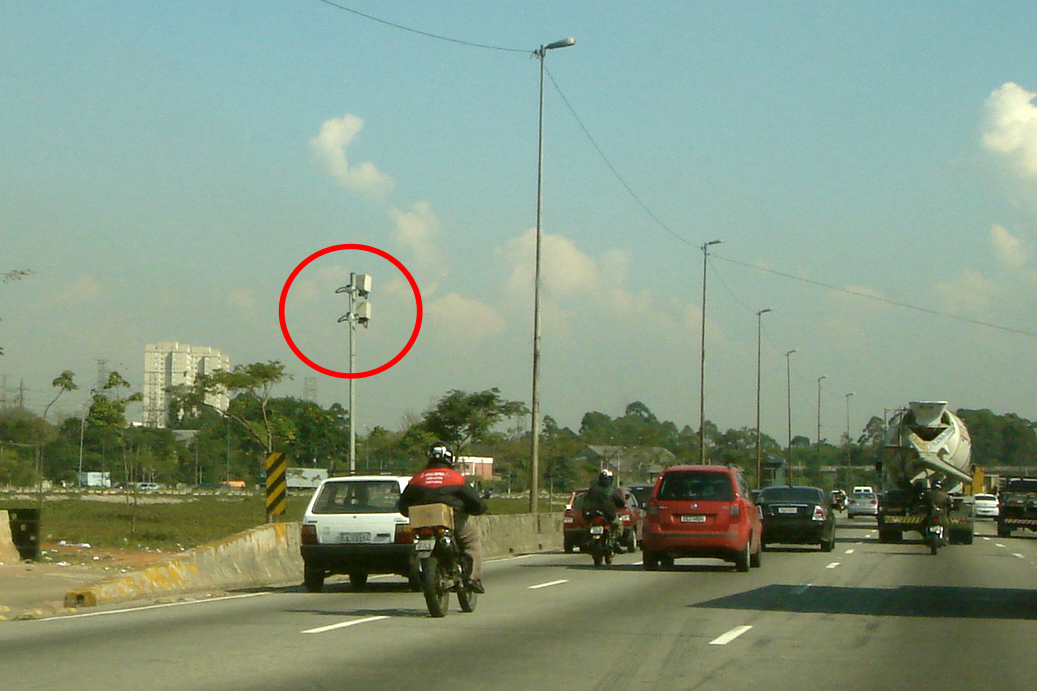
Automatic speed limit surveillance devices are used in São Paulo to enforce alternate-day travel restrictions based on license plate numbers.

São Paulo is the largest metropolis in the world with a permanent alternate-day travel restriction (Portuguese: rodízio veicular). The scheme was first implemented in 1995 as a trial on a voluntary basis, and then as a mandatory restriction implemented in August 1996 to mitigate air pollution, and thereafter made permanent in June 1997 to relieve traffic congestion. The driving restriction applies to passenger cars and commercial vehicles, and it is based on the last digit of the license plate. Two numbers are restricted to travel every day from 7 a.m. to 10 a.m. and 5 p.m. to 8 p.m. from Monday through Friday.

Vehicles exempted from the restriction include buses and other urban transportation vehicles, school buses, ambulances and other medical services vehicles, mail and fire cars and trucks, police and military vehicles, cash-in-transit armored vehicles, vehicles delivering perishable food products, properly registered vehicles for use by people with disabilities, and other public utility vehicles. In May 2014 the City Council approved a law to exempt from the restriction plug-in electric vehicles, hybrid electric vehicles and fuel-cell vehicles with a license plate registered in the city. The benefits for electric-drive vehicles went into effect in September 2015.

=== Temporary restrictions ===
==== Beijing ====
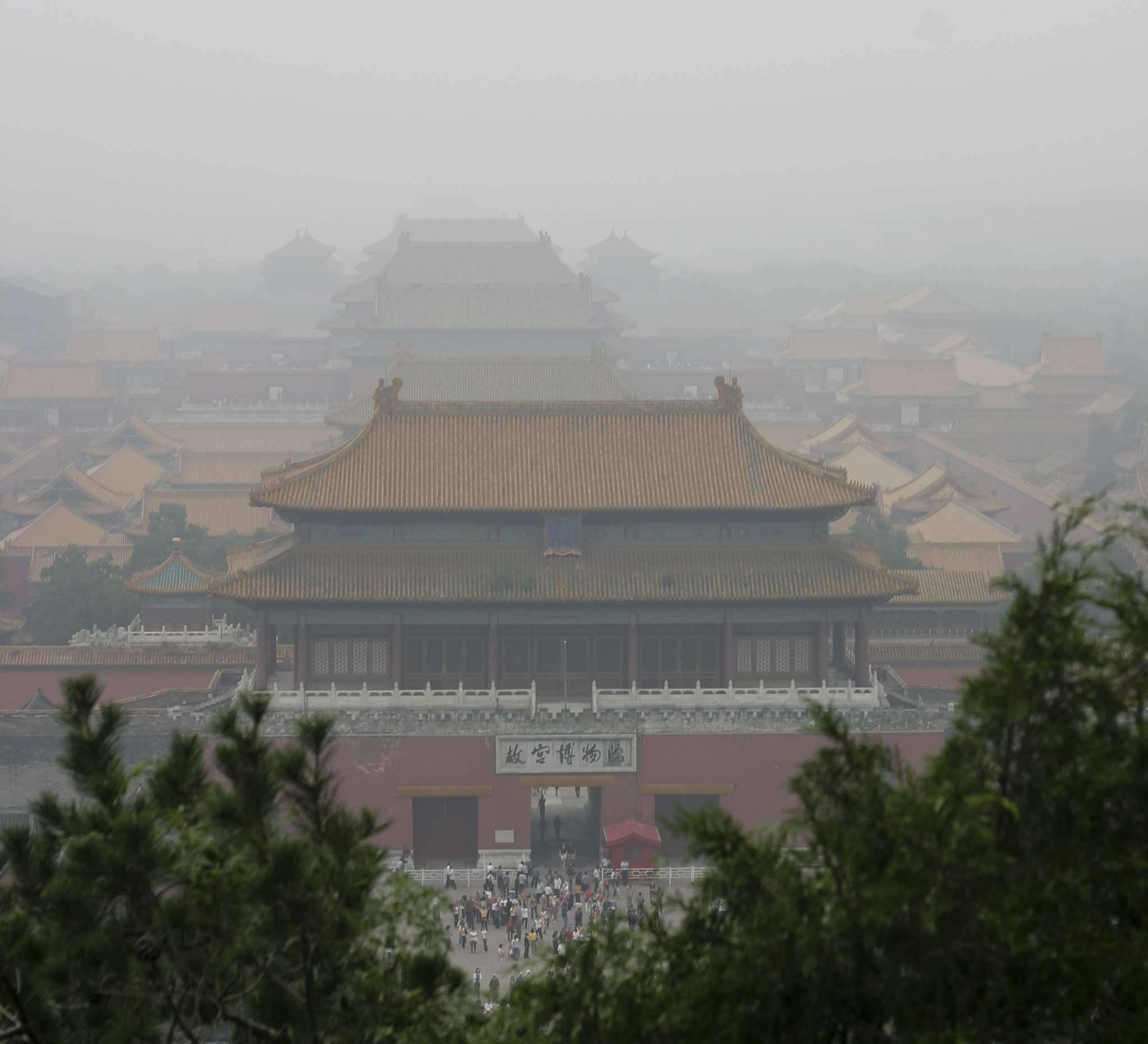
Smog over Beijing's Forbidden City.

Temporary driving restrictions were imposed in Beijing from December 8 to 10, 2015, as part of the smog mitigation measures provided for in Beijing's red alert for hazardous smog, the first such alert issued ever. The smog alert system was put in place in 2013, and a red alert should go into effect if there is a prediction that the air quality index will stay over 200 for more than 72 hours. On the evening of December 7 the index was 253 according to Beijing's authorities. Under a red alert half of the city's cars are ordered off the streets through a temporary alternate-day travel scheme based on the cars' license plate numbers. Only cars with even-numbered license plates were allowed on the roads during the first day of the restriction. Electric cars are not subject to the driving restriction, as a government incentive to promote the use of cleaner vehicles.

According to the Ministry of Environmental Protection, the combined effect of all the restrictions imposed reduced pollutant emissions in Beijing by 30% during day one of the city's first red alert for smog. Environmentalist from Beijing University of Technology estimated that without the measures, the density of PM_{2.5} would have risen by 10% in that period. A second red alert for pollution was issued on December 18, 2015. Temporary driving restrictions were imposed for four days, beginning at 7 a.m. on December 19 and ending on the 23rd at midnight.

On 16 December 2016, Beijing authorities declared a five-day pollution “red alert” due to a heavy pollution event. Among other measures, about half the cars were restricted through a temporary alternate-day travel scheme, and older and “dirty” high-emissions vehicles were forbidden to circulate. Public transport services in the city were increased, with about 3,600 buses on duty. The Ministry of Environmental Protection reported that 21 other cities across north and central China had also declared pollution red alerts, including Tianjin, Shijiazhuang, Taiyuan, and Zhengzhou. The red alert was lifted on 22 December 2016 as the winds cleared pollution away the night before.

==== Italy ====
In December 2015, several Italian cities implemented temporary driving restrictions due to severe air pollution levels. The restrictions were issued in Rome, Milan and other cities in the Lombardy region, including Pavia, Buccinasco, Cesano Boscone, Cernusco sul Naviglio, Bresso, Cinisello Balsamo, Cormano, Corsico, Cusano Milanino, Paderno Dugnano and Sesto San Giovanni. Italy had the most pollution-related deaths in Europe in 2012. Over 84,000 people in the country died prematurely owing to bad air quality, according to the European Environment Agency (EEA).

===== Milan =====
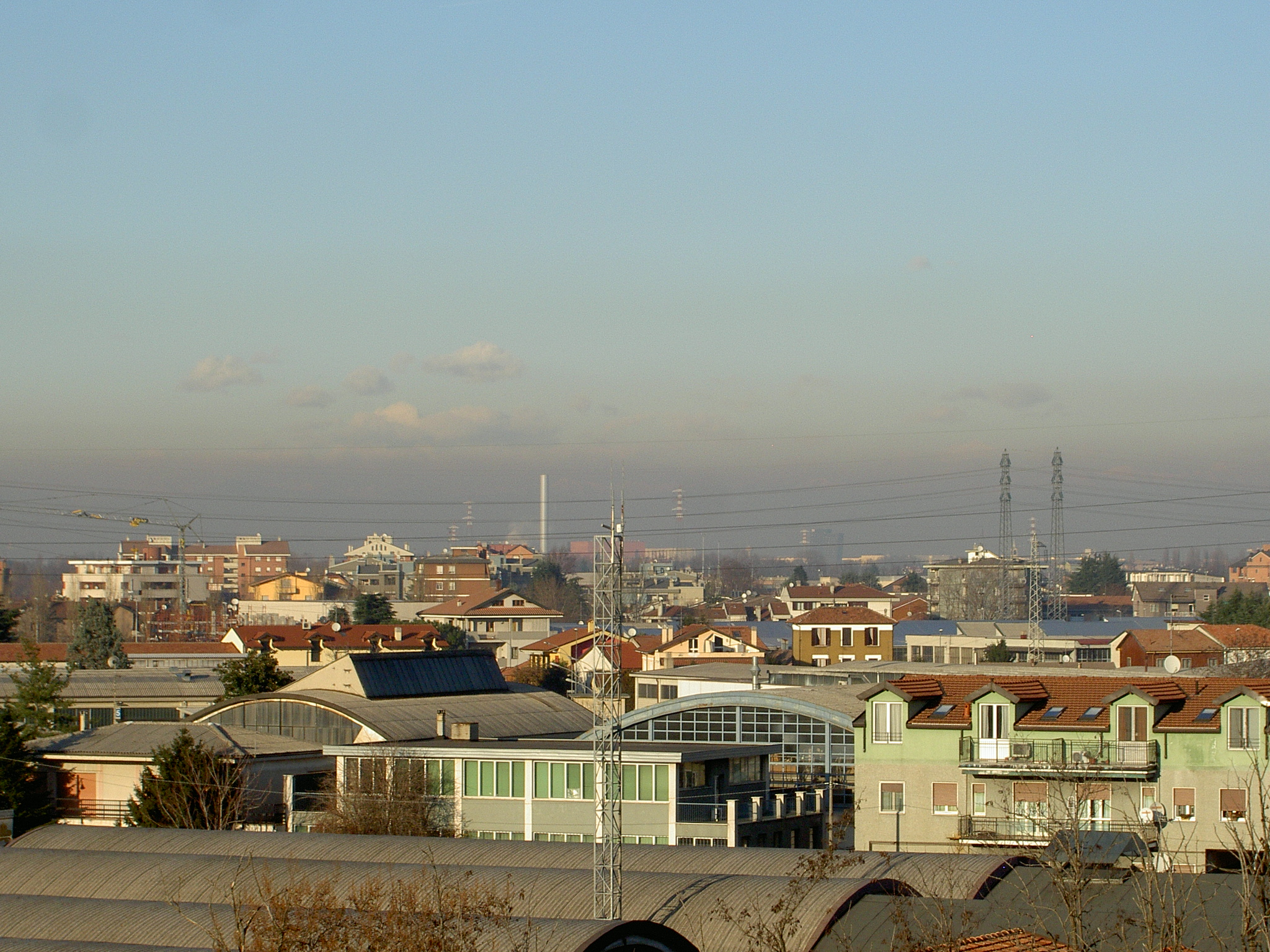
Severe smog over Milan seem from a neighboring town.

Milan was named as Europe's most polluted city in 2008 and remains among the worst on the continent. City officials have limited traffic on several occasions since 2007 to curb bad air quality. Due to record high air pollution levels, Milanese authorities ban cars, motorcycles and scooters for six hours a day, between 10 a.m. and 4 p.m. for three days during the last week of December 2015. Local authorities introduced a special "anti-smog" all-day public transport ticket for €1.50 (~US$1.65). Neighboring towns and municipalities in the Lombardy region, including Pavia, Cinisello Balsamo, Paderno Dugnano, and Sesto San Giovanni, also implemented the temporary driving restriction. Electric vehicles and carsharing cars are exempted from the ban.

===== Rome =====
An alternate-day travel scheme was implemented in Rome to curb severe air pollution in the city, which has high concentrations of particulate matter and nitrogen dioxide. The scheme was in force for several days during the last two weeks of December 2015. The driving restriction is based on the last digits of license plate numbers and was implemented for a total of nine hours, from 7:30 to 12:30 and 16:30 until 20:30. To promote ridership by public transportation, €1.50 (~US$1.65) single-ride transit tickets became passes valid all day. Environmentally friendly vehicles, such as hybrids and natural gas vehicles are exempt from the restriction. The most polluting vehicles, such as gasoline-powered cars compliant with Euro 0 and 1 standards, and diesel cars up to Euro 2, can not enter the city independently of the number plate. Rome authorities resorted to limit traffic in the city on several occasions during the fall of 2015 due to high air pollution.

==== Oslo ====
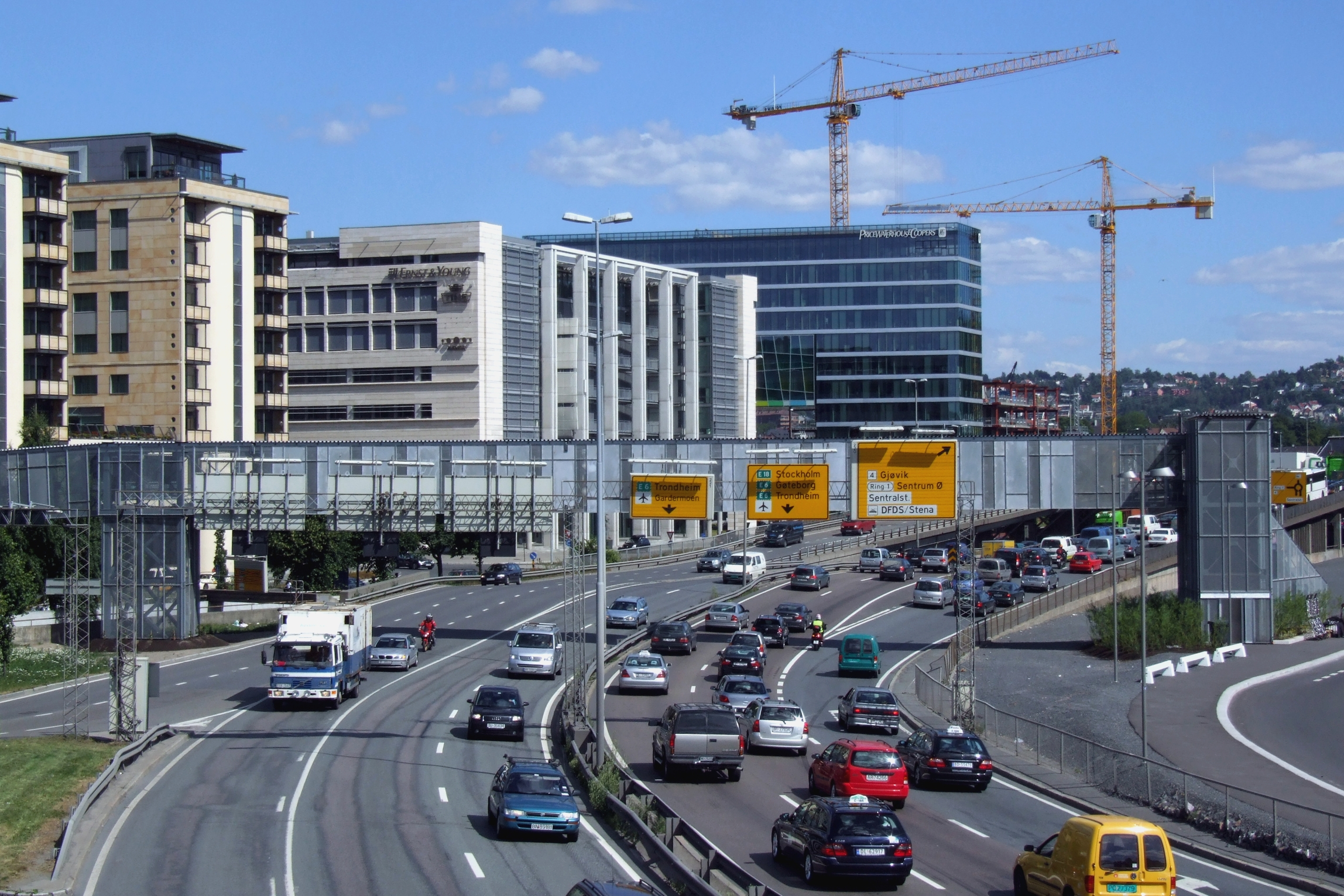
A ban on diesel-powered cars from municipal roads was implemented in Oslo on 17 January 2017.

In January 2017 a combination of cold, still winter weather and poor air quality prompted Oslo city authorities to ban diesel-powered cars from municipal roads to combat rising air pollution for at least two days. The ban did not apply on the national motorways. This was the first time ever Oslo implemented a ban of this type after the city council agreed on the use of such a measure in February 2016. The diesel ban went into effect from 6 a.m. until 10 p.m on 17 January 2017, and motorists violating the ban were fined 1,500 kroner (~ US$180). The temporary ban scheduled for 18 January was lifted after officials said the weather forecast indicated that higher altitude winds would clear the air.

The restriction did not apply to heavy vehicles with Euro VI technology, gasoline-powered cars, electric cars and plug-in hybrid vehicles, emergency vehicles, goods transport, diplomatic vehicles, handicap transport, public service vehicles, and cars carrying a patient to a doctor appointment. The restriction angered some motorists, who were encouraged by Norwegian authorities in 2006 to opt for diesel vehicles, which at the time were considered a better environmental choice than gasoline-powered cars.

==== Paris ====
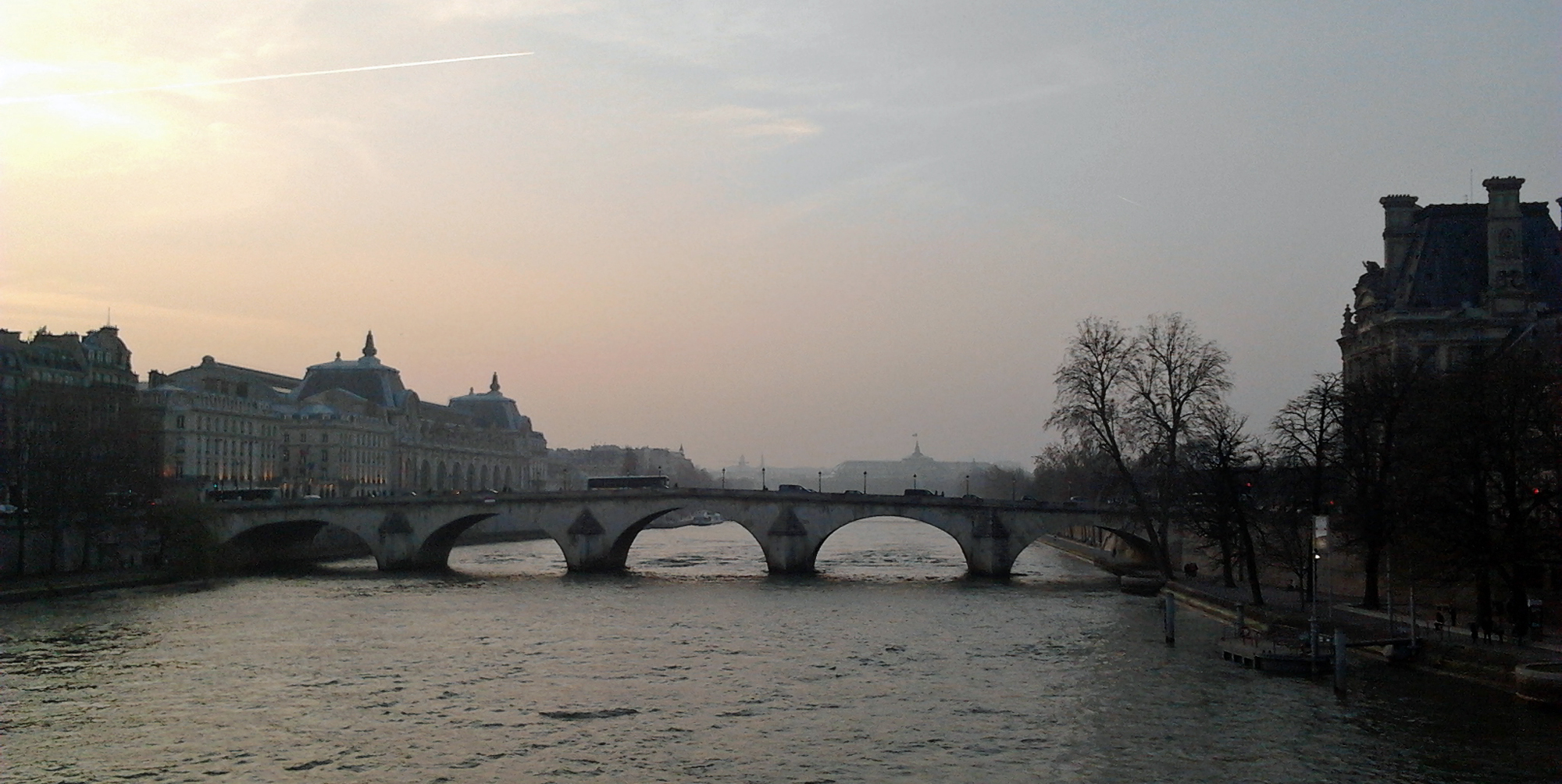
Traffic was restricted in Paris in March 2014 due to a peak in the levels of particulate matter.

On March 17, 2014, a partial driving restriction was imposed in Paris and its inner suburbs based on license plate numbers. The measure was issued by the city government in order to mitigate a peak in air pollution, caused by particulate matter (PM 10) attributable to vehicle emissions. Cars with even-numbered license plates and commercial vehicles over 3.5 tons were banned from entering the city from 5:30 a.m. until midnight. Electric and hybrid cars, natural gas-powered vehicles and carpools with three or more passengers were exempted. Only once before this type of restriction had been implemented in the city for one day in 1997. The week before the traffic restriction was imposed, the government also reduced speed limits around Paris by 20 km (12 mi) per hour, provided all public transportation for free, and the short-term subscriptions of the Vélib bikesharing program, and the first hour of the Autolib' carsharing service were free. The measure was not extended to the following day due to the improvement of air quality.

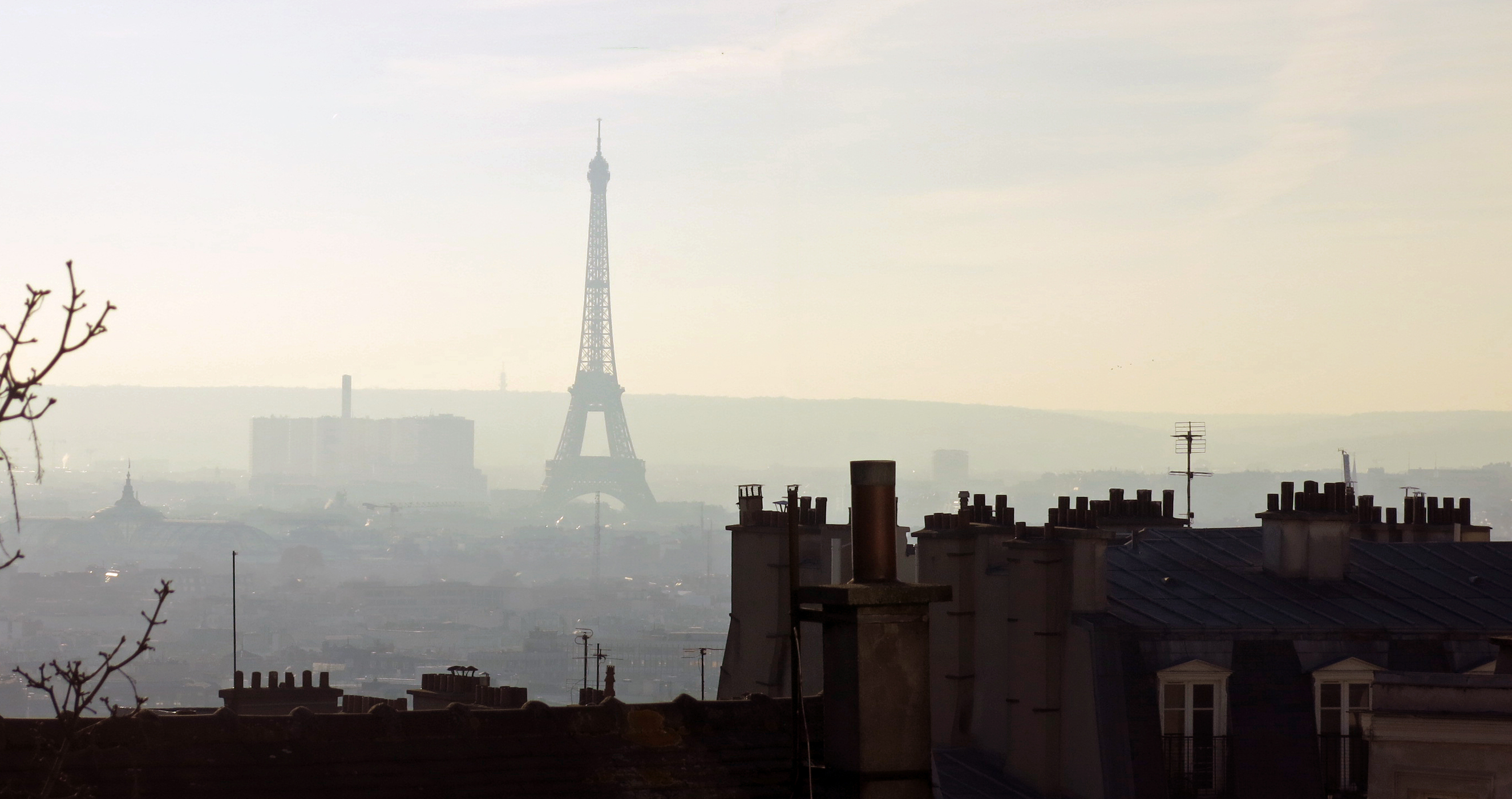
A driving restriction of four days took effect in December 2016 due to the persistence of pollution of fine particles and nitrogen dioxide.

Another peak in air pollution affected Paris and Northern France in mid March 2015. The Mayor of Paris, Anne Hidalgo, requested the central government to implement a driving restriction to mitigate the problem. The pollution index in Paris at 93 micrograms per cubic meter (mcg/m3) on Friday 20, 2015, due to increase amounts of pollutant PM10. The accepted limit for PM10 is set at 50 mcg/m3, and the safe limit or alert threshold is set at 80 mcg/m3. As the pollution episode continued on Saturday 21 according to Airparif measurements, the central government imposed a driving restriction on Monday 23 affecting cars with even-numbered license plates and commercial vehicles over 3.5 tons. Taxis, ambulances, carpools with three or more passengers, electric cars and other environmentally friendly vehicles were exempted. As in the 2014 episode, complementary measures were implemented including reduced speed limits in the city, free public transportation, free residential parking, and free short-term use for subscribers of bike and carsharing services. The restriction was implemented in Paris and 22 towns located in the administrative region of Île-de-France.

In early December 2016, Paris and its surrounding region suffered for a week the longest and most intense winter pollution episode in 10 years. A driving restriction went into effect in Paris and 22 surrounding towns for four days, from Tuesday 6 to Friday 9, due to the persistence of pollution of fine particles and nitrogen dioxide. The restriction was extended for the first time in the cities of Villeurbanne and Lyon on Friday December 9. This was the fourth time in twenty years that alternating traffic is implemented in the capital, but the first time it is maintained for several days in a row.

In May 2016, the city of Paris launched a scheme called "Paris Respire" (literally "Paris breathes") as part of which certain areas of the city are closed to vehicular traffic on Sundays and public holidays.

==== New Delhi ====
According to the World Health Organization, in 2014, New Delhi had the most polluted air of about 1,600 cities the organization tracked around the world. According to India's Central Pollution Control Board, the city's air pollution had been in the severe category on nearly three-quarter of the days in November 2015. The Delhi High Court asked the government to take action to curb air pollution on 30 November 2015.

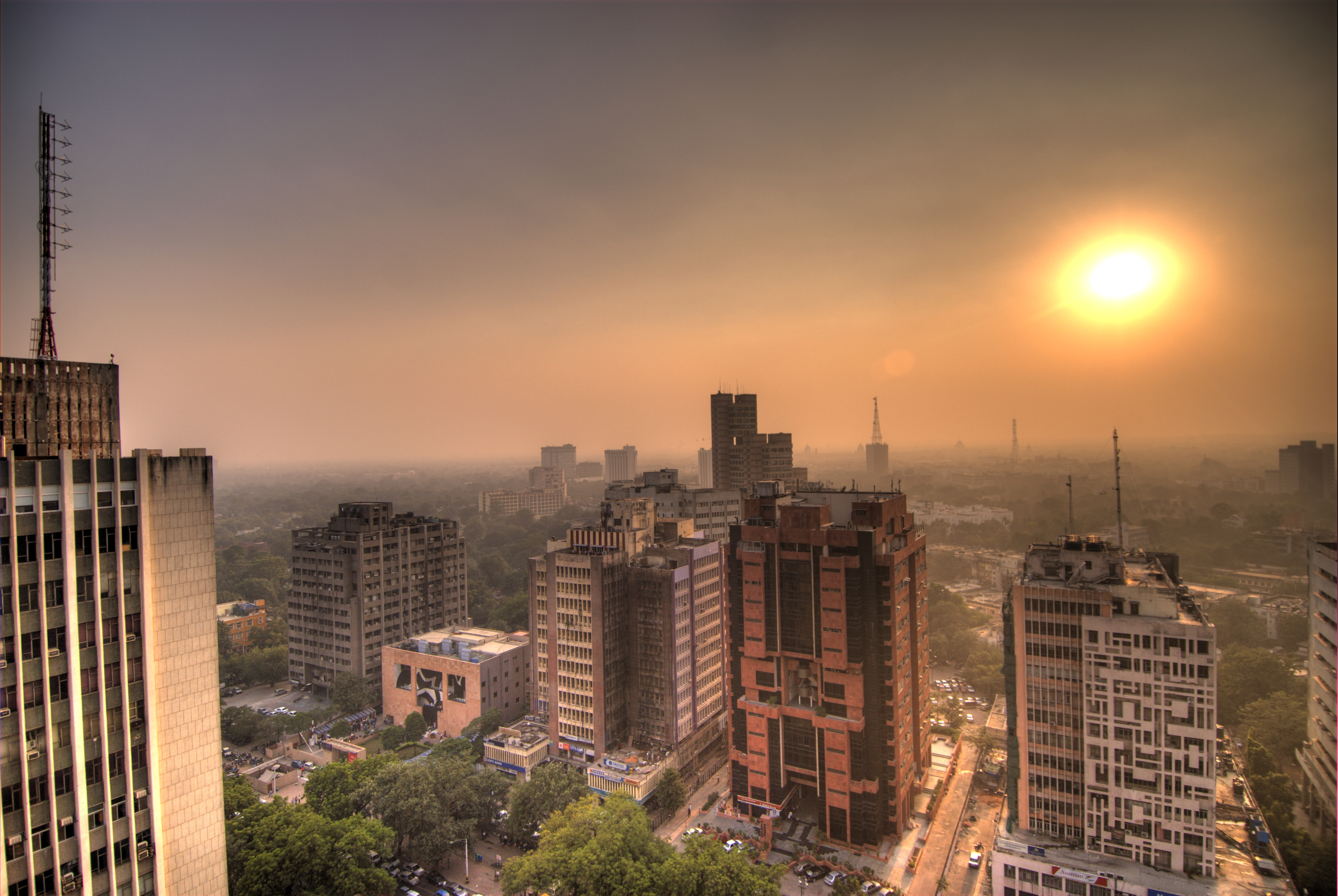
Dense smog at Connaught Place, New Delhi.

In an attempt to mitigate severe air pollution in New Delhi, which gets worst during the winter, a temporary alternate-day travel scheme for cars using the odd- and even-numbered license plates system was announced by Delhi government in December 2015. In addition, trucks were allowed to enter India's capital only after 11 p.m., two hours later than the existing restriction. Almost 9 million vehicles are registered in Delhi. The driving restriction scheme went into effect as a trial for an initial period of 15 days, from 1 to 15 January 2016. The restriction was in force from 8 a.m. till 8 p.m., and traffic was not restricted on Sundays. The scheme was expected to take more than a million private cars off the road every day.

Public transportation service was increased during the restriction period. A total of 27 exemptions to the restriction were allowed by the government, including all motorcycles, benefiting more than 5 million motorcyclists, all female drivers traveling alone, to ensure women's security, and several categories of official vehicles, including those of high-ranking officials. During the first day of the restriction there was acceptance by the general population.

A petition was filed in the Delhi High Court against the government in order to stop the implementation of the restriction driving scheme. On 9 December 2015, the Court decided to put on hold the analysis of the petition until more details of the scheme are defined by the government, and considering that no official notification has been issued by a public agency. A hearing was scheduled for December 23 for further analysis. The most contested exemption is the one for female drivers, and a legal petition was filed. A court had to decide whether it is discriminatory to allow women to drive around Delhi while some of males will be forced to leave their vehicles at home.

On 16 December 2015, the Supreme Court of India mandated several restrictions to curb pollution. Among the measures, the court banned the sale of new cars that have diesel engines and sport utility vehicles with an engine greater than 2000 cc until 31 March 2016. The court also ordered all taxis in the Delhi region to switch to compressed natural gas by 1 March 2016. Transportation vehicles than are more than 10 years old were banned from entering the capital.

== Summer Olympics ==
=== Beijing 2008 ===
On July 20, 2008, Beijing implemented a temporary road space rationing scheme based on plate numbers in order to significantly improve air quality in the city during the 2008 Summer Olympics. Enforcement was carried out through an automated traffic surveillance network. The rationing was in effect for two months, between July 20 and September 20, as the Olympics were followed by the Paralympics from September 6 until 17. The restrictions on car use was implemented on alternate days depending on the plates ending in odd or even numbers. This measure was expected to take 45% of the 3.3 million car fleet off the streets. In addition, 300,000 heavy polluting vehicles were banned from July 1, and the measure also prohibited access to most vehicles coming from outside Beijing. Authorities decided to compensate car owners for the inconvenience, by exempting them from payment of vehicle taxes for three months.

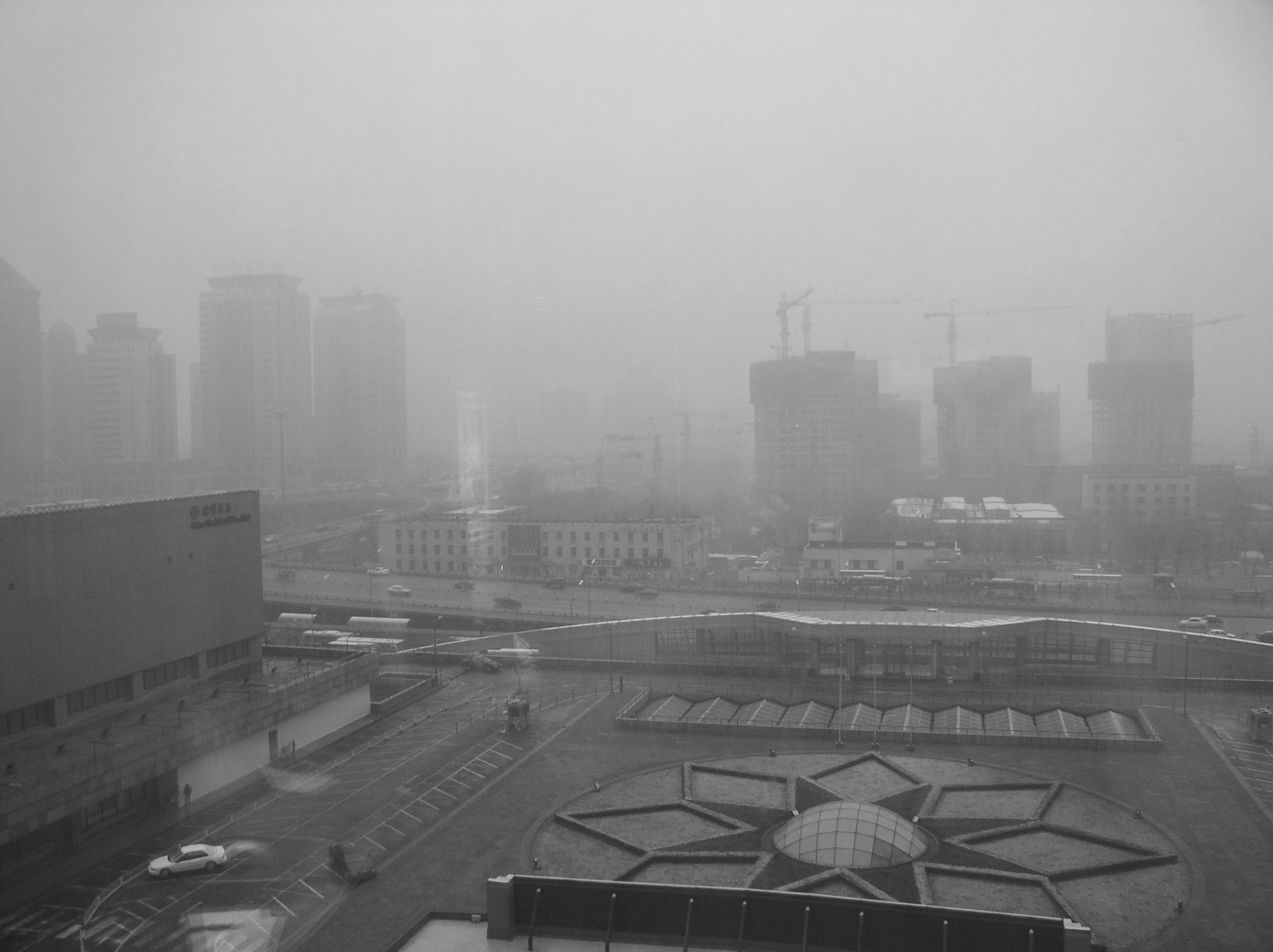
Typical severe air pollution day in Beijing

A pilot test was conducted in August 2007 for four days, restricting driving for a third of Beijing's fleet, some 1.3 million vehicles. A 40% daily reduction of vehicle emissions was reported. A previous test carried out in November 2006 during the Sino-African Summit show reductions of 40% in NOx auto emissions.

==== Post-Olympics permanent rule ====
The driving restriction during the Olympics was so successful in cleaning the air and relieving traffic congestion, that a modified version of the scheme was made permanent afterward in October 2008, now banning 20% of the vehicles on a given weekday instead of half the vehicles as implemented during the Olympics. Also a ban on heavy trucks from entering the city during the day was implemented, and the oldest most polluting automobiles, called "yellow-label" cars, after the sticker fixed to their windshields, are banned from entering the city center. In July 2009 a nationwide car scrappage program was implemented offering rebates for trade in old heavy polluting cars and trucks for new ones. As of June 2016, in addition to Beijing, another 11 Chinese cities have similar restriction schemes in place.

=== London 2012 ===
The 2012 Summer Olympics organization, with support from the Mayor of London office, announced in 2007 that they were planning auto exclusion zones around all venues, including London, Birmingham, Manchester, Newcastle upon Tyne, Glasgow and Cardiff. London authorities hoped this measure would work as an experiment to change the public's travel behavior, allowing thereafter a shift from automobile to mass transit or bicycling. This severe policy has been publicized as the "First Car-free Olympics". During the peak events, the Olympics expected a crowd of 800,000 people. Those attending had to travel by public transport, mainly through the Underground, or by bicycle or on foot.

This strategy was deemed effective and successful by Transport for London. Over 60 million passengers used the tube, which was 30% more than usual usage. Road Traffic was reduced by 15% and only 30% of designated game lanes were in operation each day of the Olympics. Regular transport users altered their travel methods and times to avoid hotspots during the games. The success of the strategy was largely due to the cooperation of the residents of London and visitors attending the games.

== Similar management and rationing policies ==
=== Congestion pricing ===
Transport economists consider road space rationing a variation of road pricing, and an alternative to congestion pricing, but road space rationing is considered more equitable by some, as the restrictions force all drivers to reduce auto travel, while congestion pricing restrains less those who can afford paying the congestion charge. Nevertheless, high-income users can often avoid the restrictions by owning a second car. Moreover, congestion pricing (unlike rationing) acts "to allocate a scarce resource to its most valuable use, as evinced by users' willingness to pay for the resource". While some "opponents of congestion pricing fear that tolled roads will be used only by people with high income. But preliminary evidence suggests that the new toll lanes in California are used by people of all income groups. The ability to get somewhere fast and reliably is valued in a variety of circumstances. Not everyone will need or want to incur a toll on a daily basis, but on occasions when getting somewhere quickly is necessary, the option of paying to save time is valuable to people at all income levels."

=== Mobility rights or congestion credits ===
A more recent idea for automobile travel restrictions, proposed by some transport economists to avoid inequality and revenue allocation issues, is to implement a rationing of peak period travel but through revenue-neutral credit-based congestion pricing. This concept is similar to the existing system of emissions trading of carbon credits, proposed by the Kyoto Protocol to curb greenhouse emissions. Metropolitan area or city residents, or the taxpayers, will have the option to use the local government-issued mobility rights or congestion credits for themselves, or to trade or sell them to anyone willing to continue traveling by automobile beyond the personal quota. This trading system will allow direct benefits to be accrued by those users shifting to public transportation or by those reducing their peak-hour travel rather than the government.

== See also ==
- Car-Free Days
- Common good (economics)
- Commons dilemma
- Congestion pricing
- Downs–Thomson paradox
- Externalities
- Induced demand
- Jevons paradox
- Lewis–Mogridge position
- Low-emission zone
- Odd-even rationing
- Public good
- Rationing
- Right to mobility
- Road pricing
- Traffic calming
- Tragedy of the Commons
