= Paris Breathes =

French car-free scheme

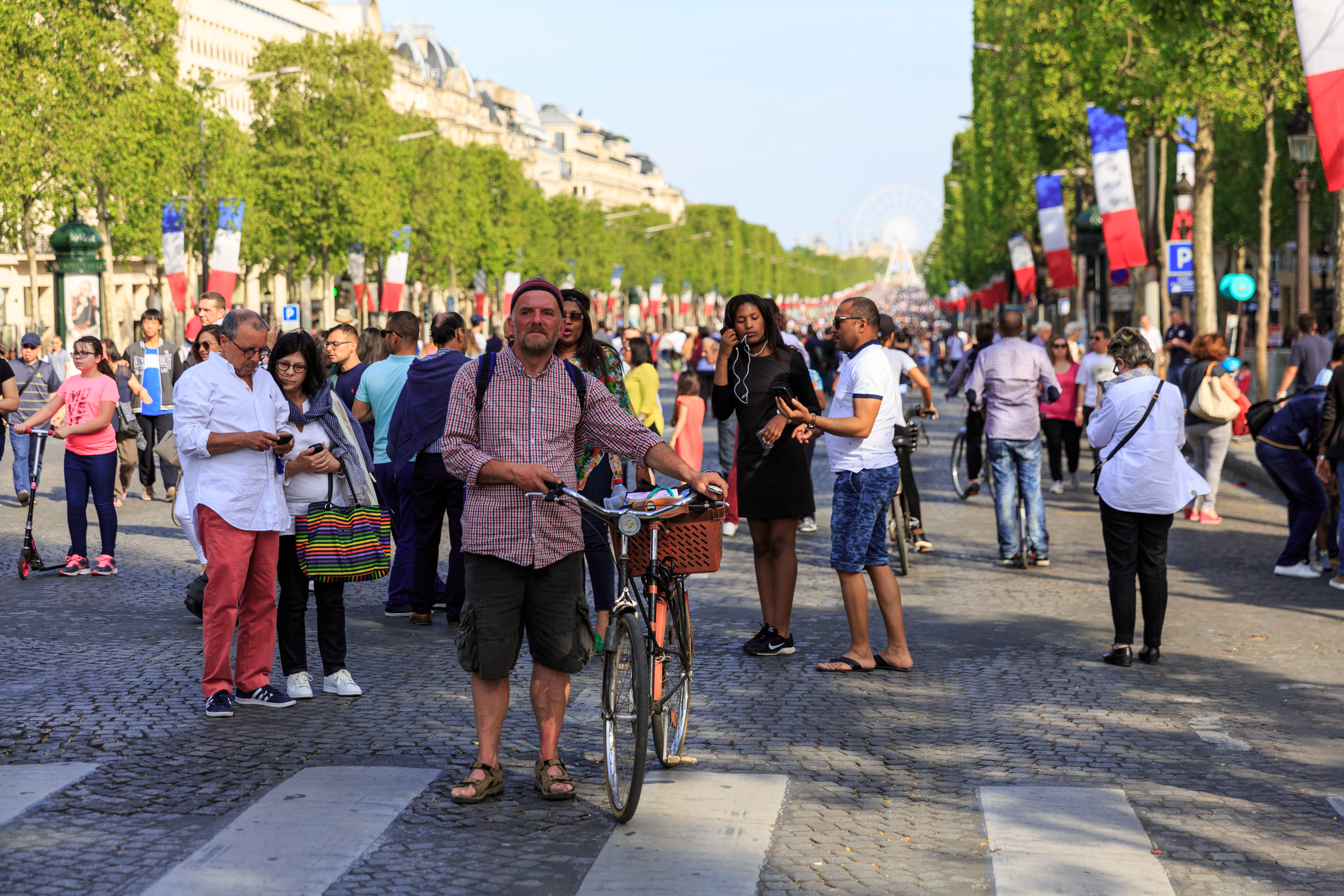
Pedestrians and cyclists on the Champs-Elysées during the first Paris Breathes day in 2016

Paris Breathes (in French: Paris Respire) is the name of a car-free scheme begun in May 2016 where certain districts, or quartiers, are closed to motorized traffic on Sundays and public holidays between the hours of 10am and 6pm. Some districts are closed every Sunday. Four arrondissements—the 1st, 2nd, 3rd, and 4th—are closed to motorized traffic the first Sunday of every month. The roads closed include those by the River Seine, in the Marais, the Canal Saint Martin, Montmartre as well as roads elsewhere in the city.

There are exceptions, however, to the prohibitions to motorized traffics. Taxis, buses, and delivery vehicles are allowed limited access to these areas provided that they do not exceed a maximum speed of 20 kilometers per hour (about 12.4 miles per hour). There is unlimited access to those who are walking, cycling, or skating.

== See also ==
- Cycling in Paris
- Pedestrian zone
- Hoy No Circula
- Road space rationing
- Anne Hidalgo
