= Hoy No Circula =

Plan to reduce vehicle emissions based on license plate number

Weekday	Plate's last digit	Sticker color
Monday	5 or 6	yellow
Tuesday	7 or 8	pink
Wednesday	3 or 4	red
Thursday	1 or 2	green
Friday	9 or 0 or letters only or temporary plates	blue

Hoy No Circula (In Spanish: "today [your car] does not circulate", known as No-drive days) is the name of an environmental program intended to improve the air quality of Mexico City. A similar coordinated program operates within the State of México, which surrounds Mexico City on three sides. Mexico City and Mexico State have reciprocal agreements with surrounding states that also have emissions testing programs to permit their residents to travel freely without restriction.

The restriction does not apply to vehicles that have other than 0 or 00 sticker (permits driving every day without restriction) and are plated in Mexico City, Mexico State and surrounding states that have an agreement with Mexico City and Mexico State. It is based on the last digit of their license plate. There are other restrictions that are applicable to non-local vehicles and foreigners, which are presented in the remainder of this article.

The hours of the program are from 5 A.M. to 10 P.M.

Emissions testing is conducted every 6 months.

== History ==
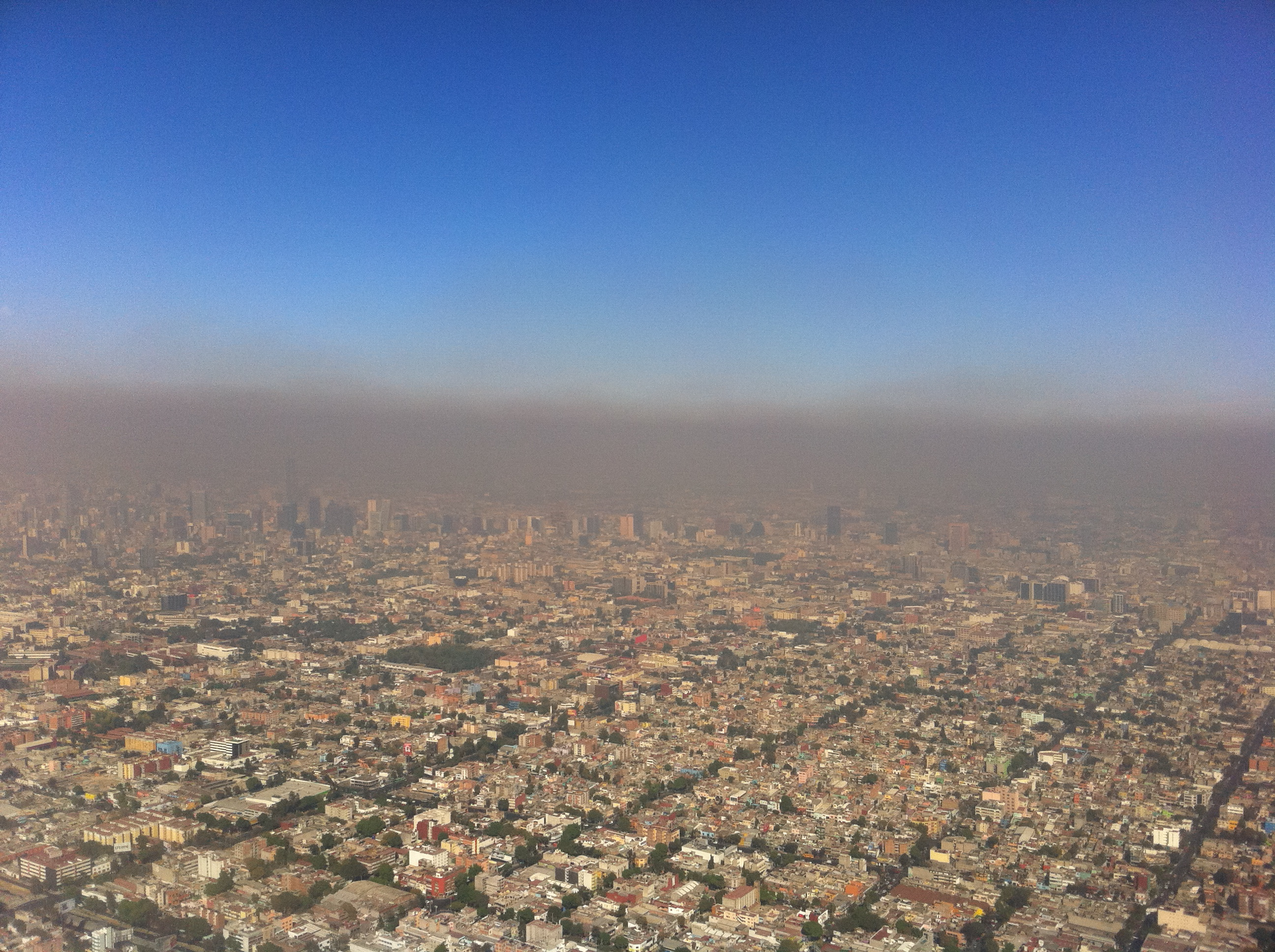
Smog over Mexico City in December 2010

The "Hoy no Circula" program was started in late 1989, and consisted of prohibiting the circulation of 20% of vehicles from Monday to Friday depending on the last digit of their license plates.

The program was planned to apply only during the winter, when air pollution is at its worst. Winter follows the rainy season when thermal inversion, an atmospheric condition which traps smog and pollution close to the ground, increases air pollution noticeably.

The program was made permanent at the end of the 1990 winter season.

== Emissions testing ==
Hoy No Circula is coupled with an exhaust monitoring program, known as verificación in Spanish, whereby a car's pollutant emissions are analyzed every six months. A sticker is affixed to each vehicle following an emissions test, indicating whether a vehicle is exempt from the program or not. Based on the result of their emissions test, vehicles are assigned to four classes. Class "00" (for certain new vehicles that exempt from emissions testing for up to 2, 4 or 6 years depending on gas mileage and the amount of emissions they put out, the local environmental authorities keep a list of which vehicles are eligible). For 2008, this includes certain 2009, 2008 and 2007 model year vehicles. Class "0" (generally, cars less than 9 years old and meeting more stringent emissions requirements) are exempt from the Hoy no Circula program. Class "1" vehicles are subject to the Hoy no Circula program. Class "1" vehicles as of 2008 are now grouped under Class "2" vehicles. Class "2" vehicles (including all pre-1991 passenger cars) meet weaker emissions requirements, but are subject to both Hoy no Circula and an environmental contingency program. Class 2 vehicles also include all vehicles that are older than 8 years old and that do not have an extension as permitted under the Class 00 program. No foreign plated vehicle or vehicle from a state other than the State of Mexico or Mexico City is eligible to receive a 2 sticker per Class 2 regulations. Those vehicles must obey the hoy no circula program.

== Property tax ==
If a Mexican vehicle's property tax (known in Spanish as tenencia) is not paid, or lapses, the vehicle will not be permitted to have the obligatory emissions testing performed. Such vehicles are then not allowed on the road, and their owners are fined if the property tax hologram is absent after the expiration date. Foreign-plated vehicles that test in a voluntary manner are not subject to this requirement.

They are not allowed to circulate on the average weekday, down from 20% when the program was launched. As of 2008, only vehicles under 9 years old are allowed to receive the 0 or 00 sticker. Only locally plated vehicles may receive a 2 sticker. Emergency services, solar or electric vehicles, government and school buses are also exempt. There is under the law a special exemption for vehicles, regardless of model year, for handicapped individuals. This also includes handicapped individuals with handicapped plates not from the Federal District or the State of Mexico. Diplomatic vehicles are also exempt. Vehicles that are 30 years or older can apply for an auto antiguo (antique) license plate, that exempts them from emissions testing and hoy no circula restrictions. This requires an inspection of the vehicle by local authorities and a large fee to be paid (currently around US$1000) in order to receive these plates. Motorcycles are currently exempt. However, those traveling by motorcycle through the metropolitan area should keep in mind that traffic laws (unrelated to hoy no circula) prohibit motorcycles to travel on expressways and therefore they must use side roads, streets, avenues, etc.

Note that on certain holidays, the local authorities will permit, depending on environmental conditions, for any vehicle to circulate without restriction. This is usually noted through local media.

== Vehicles with license plates from outside Mexico City ==
Foreign-plated automobiles (e.g., from Belize, Canada, Guatemala, and the United States) and those from Mexican states that do not have a reciprocal agreement with Mexico City and the State of Mexico are subject to the vehicle restriction regulations. To be exempted from driving restrictions, a vehicle must be of a model year not more than 8 years old and must pass emissions-testing in Mexico City. If the vehicle passes and receives a "0" or "00" hologram sticker (the "00" sticker is for new automobiles), it will be allowed to travel freely though Mexico City and Mexico State, even in the case of an environmental contingency. Like locally plated vehicles, it must continue to be tested every 6 months until the vehicle's model year is 9 years old, after which it is subject to the rules described below.

A visitor who desires to drive their foreign-plated car in Mexico City may obtain a special two-week pass once every six months if their car was manufactured in or after 1994. The pass must be applied for online before the visit.

If a vehicle-owner from outside Mexico City or the State of Mexico chooses not to test (the test is voluntary) or is no longer eligible for a "0" or "00" hologram sticker, they are subject to a set of rules separate from those of locally plated vehicles. The first restriction, is a prohibition on operation from 5 a.m. to 11 a.m., Monday through Friday. The second restriction is like that of locally plated vehicles—prohibition on operation from 5 a.m. to 10 p.m. on one of the five days from Monday through Friday, depending on the last digit of the license plate. Since July 1, 2014, foreign plated vehicles are prohibited from operating on Saturdays.

Example: The last license-plate digit of a vehicle from Illinois is 3. From Monday to Friday, it may not be driven between 5 a.m. and 11 a.m. On Wednesday, it may not be driven between 5 a.m. and 10 p.m.

Automobiles registered in the states of Guanajuato, Hidalgo, México, Michoacán, Morelos, Puebla, Querétaro and Tlaxcala are not eligible for a "00" hologram sticker.

Currently, Mexico City and Mexico State have reciprocal agreements that recognize emissions stickers from the Mexican states of Guanajuato, Hidalgo, Michoacan, Morelos, Puebla, Querétaro and Tlaxcala.

Additionally, there are restrictions that apply on Saturday.

== Saturday restrictions ==
A new restriction that began on July 5, 2008, applies only to locally plated vehicles with a 2 sticker and non-local vehicles that do not have a 0 or 00 sticker.

Depending on the last digit of one's license plate, vehicles are not permitted to circulate in Mexico City or Mexico State on Saturday between the hours of 5 a.m. to 10 p.m. on one Saturday a month.

Saturday	Plate's last digit	Sticker color
1st & 3rd of the month	odd numbers	yellow
2nd & 4th of the month	even numbers	pink

Example: A vehicle from the US State of Illinois has their last digit being a 3. Thus under the rules above from Monday to Friday, they cannot drive between 5 a.m. to 11 a.m. However, on Wednesday, they have the additional restriction that they cannot drive between 5 a.m. to 10 p.m. And on the third Saturday of the month they cannot circulate between 5 a.m. to 10 p.m. The only way they can get around this is to obtain a 0 or 00 sticker should their vehicle be 8 years old or newer.

Example: A vehicle from Mexico City has a 2 sticker and the last digit of their license plate is a 3. Thus under the rules they cannot drive on Wednesday from 5 a.m. to 10 p.m. and the third Saturday of the month from 5 a.m. to 10 p.m.

== Environmental contingency ==
Under certain conditions, an environmental contingency is declared. This affects vehicles that do not have a 0 or 00 sticker or are subject to some other exemption. Although rarer in previous years, it is important to check with local authorities and pay attention to local news outlets to understand what restrictions (hours) and to whom it affects. Such restrictions are often changed every six months and are related to the levels of ozone and particulate matter in the air, which are measured hourly.

== Special pass for tourists ==
Drivers of Vehicles from Mexican states or foreign countries without a reciprocity agreement with either Mexico City or Mexico State can obtain a tourist pass known as Pase Turístico, that allows one to drive in Mexico City and Mexico State for up to two weeks and be exempt from the Hoy No Circula program. Eligible drivers do not need to pass an emissions test. However, one can only receive this pass if theirs vehicle is a 2008 model year or newer, http://www.paseturistico.cdmx.gob.mx/pasetur/ . During part of early December to early January, Mexico City and Mexico State participate in a special program with the federal government called the Programa Paisano. One part of this program permits, without any special pass, for foreign-plated vehicles regardless of model year (those with plates from other than states in Mexico) to pass freely through the metropolitan area without regard to the Hoy No Circula program.

== See also ==
- Car Free Days
- Congestion pricing
- Road pricing
- Road space rationing (traffic restraint by license plate number)
- Paris Breathes
