= Odd–even rationing =

Resource management method

Odd–even rationing is a method of rationing in which access to some resource is restricted to some of the population on any given day. In a common example, drivers of private vehicles may be allowed to drive, park, or purchase gasoline on alternating days, according to whether the last digit in their license plate is even or odd. Similarly, during a drought, houses can be restricted from using water outdoors according to the parity of the house number.

Typically a day is "odd" or "even" depending on the day of the month. An issue with this approach is that two "odd" days in a row occur whenever a month ends on an odd-numbered day. Sometimes odd or even may be based on day of the week, with Sundays excluded or included for everyone.

== Effectiveness ==
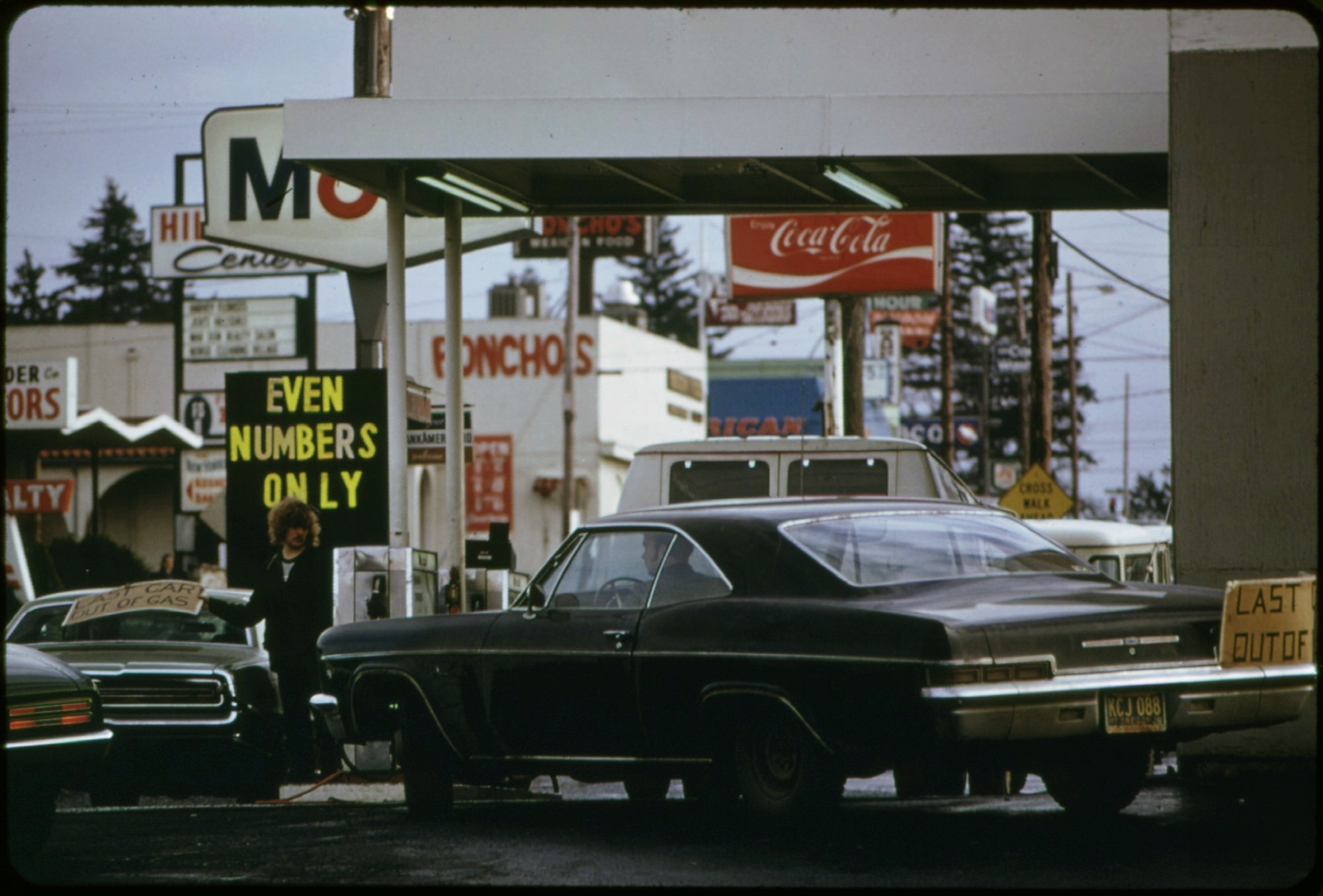
Motorists with even-numbered licenses line up for gasoline on an even-numbered day, Portland, OR, 1973.

The efficacy of odd–even rationing is debated. For gasoline, it does not actually reduce consumption much, since people prevented from filling up one day will just fill up the day before or the day after; the total number of people in line on each day is roughly unchanged. Some propose that it has psychological effects like reducing panic buying, discouraging people from making small purchases on a daily basis, or emphasizing the shortage and further discouraging unnecessary trips.

Rationing access, rather than gasoline, based on number plate parity can reduce traffic congestion. In some areas, wealthier people purposely own two cars with opposite-parity number plates, to circumvent any restrictions.

Vanity plates which do not contain any digits may be arbitrarily classed as odd or even, likely using the last plate letter's numerical equivalent from 1 to 26.

== Dealing with 0 ==
Mathematically, zero is an even number; half of the numbers in a given range end in 0, 2, 4, 6, 8 and the other half in 1, 3, 5, 7, 9, so it makes sense to include 0 with the other even digits for rationing. However, the general public is not always aware of the mathematical principle and think that zero is odd, or both even and odd, or neither. The relevant law sometimes stipulates that zero is even. In fact, an odd–even restriction on driving in Paris in 1977 did lead to confusion when the rules were unclear. On an odd-only day, the police avoided fining drivers whose plates ended in 0, because they did not know whether 0 was even.

== U.S. gasoline rationing ==
Odd–even rationing was instituted in the U.S. as part of the response to the second gasoline crisis in 1979, when turbulent conditions in Iraq and Iran led to worldwide oil price increases, even though a supply shortage did not materialize in the U.S.

After Hurricane Sandy hit the eastern coast in late October 2012, gasoline became scarce and caused lines to extend miles past stations and people to wait for hours to fill cars or gasoline tanks for generators powering houses without electricity. Panic buying and fuel hoarding began within days of the storm. On November 3, 2012, New Jersey governor Chris Christie issued a gas rationing system to follow the odd–even rule to ease lines in 12 counties. A few days later on November 8, New York City Mayor Michael Bloomberg, along with Nassau County Executive Ed Mangano and Suffolk County Executive Steve Bellone, instituted an odd–even rationing system due to gasoline shortages from Hurricane Sandy. In New York City, such rationing lasted through November 23 due to the increased travel and gasoline demand during the Thanksgiving week, while it ended more than a week earlier in the other counties. License plates without numbers, such as vanity plates, were considered odd.

== India ==
In Delhi, during the ministry of Arvind Kejriwal, private vehicles could be on the road only on certain days, depending on their license plate number, from January 1, 2016. The scheme aimed to reduce pollution and smog in Delhi. The scheme was ended on November 11, 2017.

The scheme came into force for the third time on November 4, 2019, after the success of first two times. The results were visible from the very first day as people of Delhi welcomed the move.

== Indonesia ==
On August 30, 2016, the Jakarta city government replaced the "3-in-1" system (high-occupancy vehicle lanes), which have attracted car jockeys trying to beat the system, with a system called ganjil-genap (odd/even rule). Odd plate numbers can enter former "3-in-1" areas on odd days and even plate numbers on even ones.

== See also ==
- Road space rationing
