= Bunker Hill =

Bunker Hill, Bunkers Hill or Bunker's Hill may refer to:

== Massachusetts, U.S. ==
- Bunker Hill, after which the Battle of Bunker Hill was named, a hill in the Boston neighborhood of Charlestown
  - Battle of Bunker Hill, a 1775 American Revolutionary War battle fought near the hill
    - USS Bunker Hill (CV-17), an Essex-class aircraft carrier
    - USS Bunker Hill (CG-52), a Ticonderoga-class cruiser
  - Bunker Hill Community College, a college in Charlestown, Boston
  - Bunker Hill Monument, an obelisk in Charlestown, Boston

== Other places in the U.S. ==
- Bunker Hill, Los Angeles, California, a district in downtown Los Angeles
- Bunker Hill (Waterbury), a neighborhood of the city of Waterbury, Connecticut
- Bunker Hill, Illinois
- Bunker Hill Township, Macoupin County, Illinois
- Bunker Hill, Indiana, a town in Miami County
  - Bunker Hill Air Force Base, now Grissom Air Reserve Base
- Bunker Hill, Fayette County, Indiana
- Bunker Hill, Kansas
- Bunker Hill (Millersville, Maryland)
- Bunker Hill Township, Michigan
- Bunker Hill, Howard County, Missouri
- Bunker Hill, Lewis County, Missouri
- Bunker Hill, Stoddard County, Missouri
- Bunker Hill (Nevada), a mountain in the Toiyabe Range
- Bunker Hill, Oregon
- Bunker Hill, Tennessee
- Bunker Hill, Washington
- Bunker Hill, West Virginia
- Bunker Hill, Wisconsin

== Places in Australia ==
- Bunkers Hill, Victoria, location near Ballarat, Australia

== Places in Jamaica ==
- Bunkers Hill, Jamaica, location in Trelawny Parish

== Places in England ==
- Bunkers Hill, Cambridgeshire, a location in England
- Bunkers Hill, Greater Manchester, a location in England
- Bunkers Hill, Lincolnshire, a location in England
- Bunkers Hill, Norfolk, a location in England
- Bunker's Hill, Nottingham, location of St Stephen's Church, Bunker's Hill
- Bunkers Hill, Oxfordshire, a location in England
- Bunkers Hill, Suffolk, a location in England
- Bunker's Hill, Wolverhampton, an area of Wolverhampton

== Other uses ==
- Bunker Hill (film), a film by Kevin Willmott
- Bunker Hill (musician), American R&B and gospel singer
- Bunker Hill (song), a 2003 song by the Red Hot Chili Peppers
- Bunker Hill Historic District
- "Bunker Hill" (Supergirl), an episode of Supergirl
- The Death of General Warren at the Battle of Bunker's Hill, June 17, 1775, painting

== See also ==
- Bunker Hill Covered Bridge
- Bunker Hill Military Academy
- Bunker Hill Mine and Smelting Complex
- Bunker Hill School
- Bunker Hill House, a National Register of Historic Places listing in Preble County, Ohio
- Pure Genius, an American medical drama television series originally titled Bunker Hill
