= Bunker (disambiguation) =

A bunker is a protective fortification.

Bunker and its variants may also refer to:

== Places ==
- Bunker, Missouri, U.S.
- Bunker (Berlin), an air raid shelter in Germany
- Bunker Creek (New Hampshire), a stream in New Hampshire, U.S.
- Bunker Hill (disambiguation)

== People ==
- Bunker (surname)
- Bunker Roy (born 1945), Indian social activist

== Arts, entertainment, and media ==
=== Film and television ===
- The Bunker (1981 film), a film based on the 1975 book
- The Bunker (2001 film), horror film featuring Jason Flemying
- Der Bunker, a 2015 German comedy-horror film
- Bunker (2022 film), American horror film
- The Bunker (2024 film), an American film starring Tony Todd and Tobin Bell
- Bunker (2026 film), a psychological thriller film by Florian Zeller
- "The Bunker", a 2016 episode of the American television series Documentary Now!

=== Other arts, entertainment, and media ===
- Bunker (character), a DC comics superhero
- The Bunker (book), a 1975 history book about the last days of Adolf Hitler in the Führerbunker
- The Bunker (comics), a comic book published by Oni Press
- The Bunker (theatre), a fringe theatre in London 2016-2020
- The Bunker (video game), a 2016 video game
- "Bunkers", a song by The Vapors on their album New Clear Days
- Los Bunkers, Chilean alternative rock band

== Government and politics ==
- Búnker, a faction of far-right Francoists in the period of Spanish democratic transition
- International Convention on Civil Liability for Bunker Oil Pollution Damage (BUNKER), an International treaty signed in 2001

== Science and technology ==
=== Biology ===
- Bunker (fish) or Mossbunker, a species of fish also known as Menhaden

=== Transport ===
- Bunker fuel or Bunkers, fuel oil for maritime vessels
- Bunkering, the storage and supply of fuel oil for maritime vessels
- Fuel bunker often simply known as Bunker, the container for fuel (usually coal) on a steam tank locomotive or ship, or a chamber in a building for furnace coal
- Bunkers (energy in transport), international aviation and maritime greenhouse gas emissions are sometimes referred to as emissions from 'bunkers'

== Other uses ==
- Bunker (golf), a depression near a green or fairway that is usually filled with sand
- Bunker (rugby league), central location used to accommodate video referees in national rugby league matches in Australia
- Supply Depot (Toronto), a warehouse nicknamed "The Bunker"
- Führer bunker, Hitler's air raid shelter and Berlin HQ, particularly in the last months of World War II
