= Vehicles Emissions Regulation 2007 =

The Vehicles Emissions Regulation 2007 (EC) No 715/2007 is an EU Regulation that sets maximum levels of toxic emissions from motor vehicles. Since the introduction of the Euro 1 emission standard, the law has been tightened towards the EU's phase-out of fossil fuel vehicles by 2035. Member states may act sooner, as may the EU.

== Contents ==
Article 2 defines the categories of vehicle to which the limits apply, up to those under 2,610 kg.

Article 4 states manufacturers must ‘demonstrate that all new vehicles sold, registered or put into service in the Community are type approved in accordance with this Regulation’.

Article 6 requires manufacturers to ‘provide unrestricted and standardised access to vehicle repair and maintenance information’ should there be any non-compliance.

Article 13 requires penalties imposed by member states for breach are ‘effective, proportionate and dissuasive’, and breaches include any ‘false declarations’ as well as ‘use of defeat devices’.

== Related legislation ==
The Heavy Vehicle Emission Regulation (EU) 2019/1242, arts. 4–5 applies to heavier vehicles and has limits for CO_{2}.

== See also ==
- EU law
- UK enterprise law
