= Emission Performance Regulation 2019 =

The Emission Reduction Regulation 2019 (EU) 2019/631 is an EU regulation that requires progressive reduction in emissions by petrol or diesel vehicles.

It has been frequently updated, and is a step towards the EU's phase-out of fossil fuel vehicles by 2035, although many member states plan to act sooner, as may the EU.

== Contents ==
The Regulation sets overall goals for reducing emissions on vehicle manufacturer production, although not individual vehicles.

Article 1 sets "an EU fleet-wide target of 95 g CO2/km for the average emissions of new passenger cars and an EU fleet-wide target of 147 g CO2/km for the average emissions of new light commercial vehicles registered in the Union". Article 1(4) requires a further 15% reduction by 2025, and article 1(5) requires a 55% reduction by 2030.

Article 2 defines the scope of passenger cars and light commercial vehicles.

Article 6 enables manufacturers can form a pool to meet their targets.

Article 8 enables the commission to impose an "excess premium emission" on manufacturers that exceed a target, which goes into the EU's budget, of €95 per gram per kilometre of excess emissions.

Article 9 requires that manufacturer performance is published. Article 10 allows derogations for certain manufacturers.

== See also ==
- EU law
- UK enterprise law
