= Phase-out of fossil fuel vehicles =

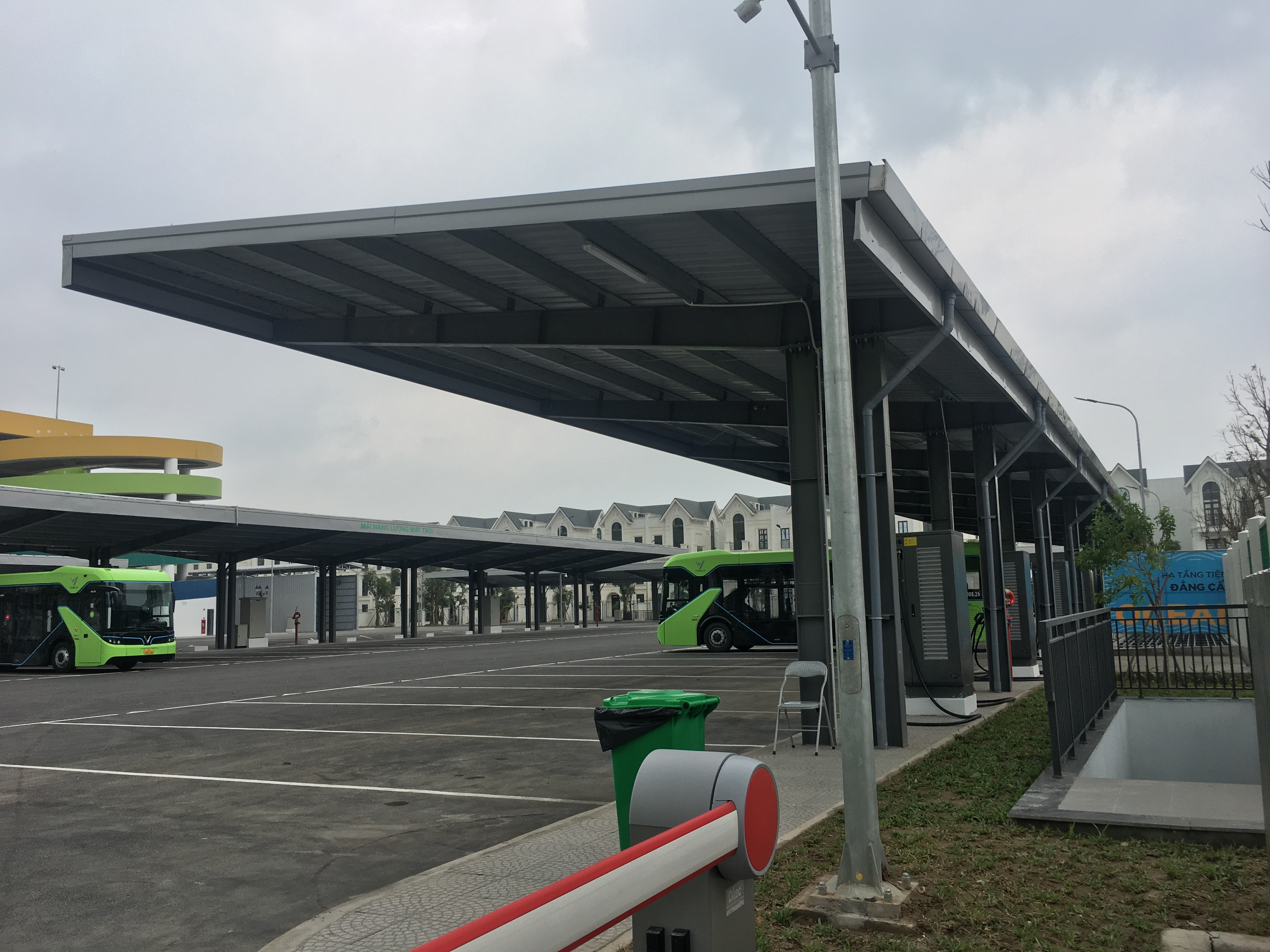
VinBus electric bus charging at VF station. Solar cells are on top of the roof.

A phase-out of fossil fuel vehicles refers to bans or discouragement (for example via taxes) on the sale of new fossil-fuel powered vehicles or use of existing fossil-fuel powered vehicles, as well the encouragement of using other forms of transportation. Vehicles that are powered by fossil fuels, such as gasoline (petrol), diesel, kerosene, and fuel oil have been phased out in some countries and are scheduled to be phased out by a number of other countries. It is one of the three most important parts of the general fossil fuel phase-out process, the others being the phase-out of fossil fuel power plants for electricity generation and decarbonisation of industry.

Many countries and cities around the world have stated they will ban the sale of passenger vehicles (primarily cars and buses) powered by fossil fuels such as petrol, liquefied petroleum gas, and diesel at some specific time in the future. A few have actually implemented this change. Synonyms for the bans include phrases like "banning gas cars", "banning petrol cars", "the petrol and diesel car ban", or simply "the diesel ban". Another method of phase-out is the use of zero-emission zones in cities.

== Background ==
Reasons for banning the further sale of fossil fuel vehicles include: reducing health risks from pollution particulates, notably diesel PM10s, and other emissions, notably nitrogen oxides; meeting national greenhouse gas, such as CO_{2}, targets under international agreements such as the Kyoto Protocol and the Paris Agreement; or energy independence. The intent to ban vehicles powered by fossil fuels is attractive to governments as it offers a simpler compliance target, compared with a carbon tax or phase-out of fossil fuels.

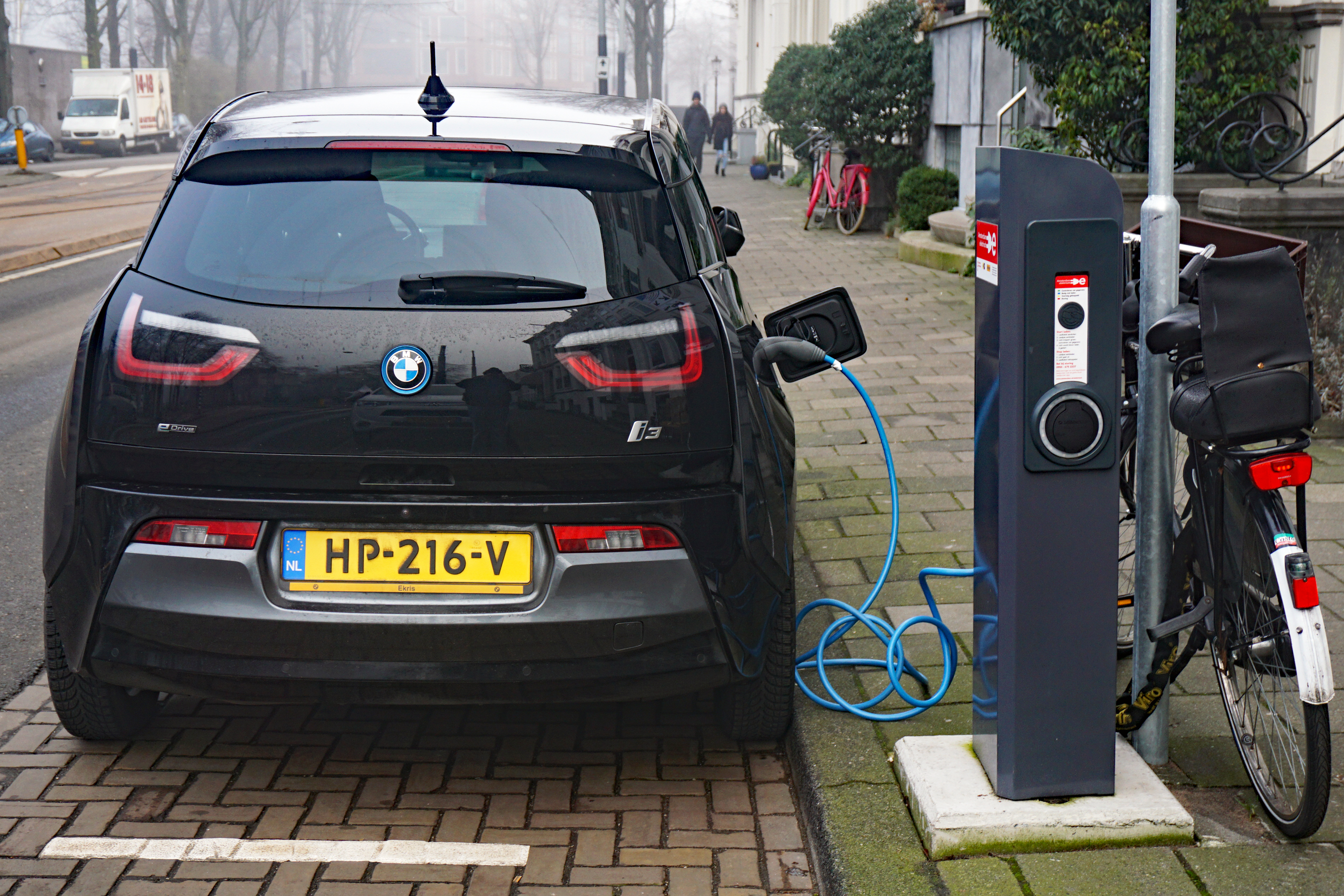
A BMW i3 being charged in Amsterdam. Electric cars had a world market share of around 5% in 2021.

The automotive industry is working to introduce electric vehicles to adapt to bans with varying success and it is seen by some in the industry as a possible source of money in a declining market. A 2020 study from the Eindhoven University of Technology showed that the manufacturing emissions of batteries of new electric cars are much smaller than what was assumed in the 2017 IVL study (Note: Romare, M. & Dahllöf, L. The Life Cycle Energy Consumption and Greenhouse Gas Emissions from Lithium-Ion Batteries. 58 (2017). "IVL" stands for Institutet för Vatten- och Luftvårdsforskning (Institute of Water and Air Navigation Research).) (around 75 kg CO_{2}/kWh) and that the lifespan of lithium batteries is also much longer than previously thought (at least 12 years with a mileage of 15,000 km annually): they are cleaner than internal combustion cars powered by diesel or petrol.

There is some opposition to simply moving from fossil-fuel-powered cars to electric cars, as they would still require a large proportion of urban land. On the other hand, there are many types of (electric) vehicles that take up little space, such as (cargo) bicycles and electric motorcycles and scooters. Making cycling and walking over short distances, especially in urban areas, more attractive and feasible with measures such as removing roads and parking spaces and improving cycling infrastructure and footpaths (including pavements), provides a partial alternative to replacing all fossil-fuelled vehicles with electric vehicles. Although there are as yet very few completely carfree cities (such as Venice), several are banning all cars in parts of the city, such as city centers.

== Methods ==
The banning of fossil-fuelled vehicles of a defined scope requires authorities to enact legislation that restricts them in a certain way. Proposed methods include:

- A prohibition on further sales or registration of new vehicles powered with specific fuels from a certain date in a certain area. At the date of implementation, existing vehicles would remain legal to drive on public highways.
- A prohibition on the importation of new vehicles powered with specific fuels from a certain date into a certain area. This is planned in countries such as Denmark and Israel; however, some countries, such as Israel, have no legislation on the subject.
- A prohibition on any use of certain vehicles powered with specific fuels from a certain date within a certain area. Restrictions such as these are already in place in many European cities, usually in the context of their low-emission zones (LEZs).

Fuel cell (electric) vehicles (FCVs or FCEVs) also allow running on (some) non-fossil fuels (i.e., hydrogen, ethanol, methanol, ).

Cities generally use the introduction of low-emission zones (LEZs) or zero-emission zones (ZEZs), sometimes with an accompanying air quality certificate sticker such as Crit'air (France), to restrict the use of fossil-fuelled cars in some or all of its territory. These zones are growing in number, size, and strictness. Some city bans in countries such as Italy, Germany, and Switzerland are only temporarily activated during particular times of the day, during winter, or when there is a smog alert (for example, in Italy in January 2020); these do not directly contribute to the phase-out of fossil fuel vehicles, but they make owning and using such vehicles less attractive as their utility is restricted and the cost of driving them increases.

Some countries have given consumers various incentives such as subsidies or tax breaks to stimulate the purchase of electric vehicles, while fossil-fuelled vehicles are taxed increasingly heavily.

== Places with existing phase-out ==
Helped by government incentives, Norway became the first country to have the majority of new vehicles sold be electric. In 2017, Norway set a target of ending sales of new Internal Combustion Engined cars by 2025. Measures included tax incentives and access to bus lanes and reduced tolls. In January 2022, 88 per cent of new vehicles sold in the country were electric. In January 2026, only seven new petrol cars were sold in Norway, with 29 hybrid, 98 diesel and more than 2000 battery electric cars. However, contrary to many false reports on the matter, this was a collection of incentives rather than an outright ban on new fossil fuel vehicles sales. EV sales reached 50% of new car sales by September 2018 and 98% of new sales in December 2025. By 2024, the majority of cars on the road were electric.

In 2024, Ethiopia announced a ban on the import of Internal Combustion Engined vehicles, leading to a boom in electric vehicle sales.

== Places with planned fossil-fuel vehicle restrictions ==
=== International ===
At the 2021 United Nations Climate Change Conference held in Glasgow multiple governments and companies signed a non-legally-binding declaration to accelerate the transition to 100% zero emission cars and vans (the Glasgow Declaration). They wanted all new cars and vans to not emit any greenhouse gas at the tailpipe by 2035 in leading markets and by 2040 globally. The United States and China (the biggest car markets) did not sign and neither did Germany (the biggest car market in the EU). Also absent from the list of signatories were major car manufacturers Volkswagen, Toyota, Renault-Nissan and Hyundai-Kia.

=== European Union ===
In 2018, Denmark proposed an EU-wide prohibition on petrol and diesel cars, but that turned out to be contrary to EU regulations. In October 2019, Denmark made a proposal for phasing out fossil fuel vehicles on the member state level by 2030 which was supported by 10 other EU member states. In July 2021, France opposed a ban on combustion-powered cars and in particular on hybrid vehicles. In July 2021, the European Commission proposed a 100% reduction of emissions for new sales of cars and vans as of 2035. On 8 June 2022, the European Parliament voted in favour of the proposal of the European Commission, but agreement with the European Union member states was necessary before a final law could be passed.

On 22 June 2022, German Finance Minister Christian Lindner stated that his government would refuse to agree on the ban. But on 29 June 2022, after 16 hours of negotiations, all climate ministers of the 27 EU member states agreed to the commission's proposal (part of the 'Fit for 55' package) to effectively ban the sale of new internal combustion vehicles by 2035 (through '[introducing] a 100% CO_{2} emissions reduction target by 2035 for new cars and vans'). Germany backed the 2035 target, asking the Commission whether hybrid vehicles or CO_{2}-neutral fuels could also comply with the proposal; Frans Timmermans responded that the Commission kept an "open mind", but at the time 'hybrids did not deliver sufficient emissions cuts and alternative fuels were prohibitively expensive.' The law for "zero CO_{2} emissions for new cars and vans in 2035" was approved by the European Parliament on 14 February 2023.

In September 2024, Italy's industry minister called on the EU to reassess its 2035 ban on petrol and diesel cars, suggesting an earlier review for clarity. The Italian government pushed for greater flexibility in achieving decarbonization goals and a more gradual transition from combustion engines.

=== Countries ===
Countries with proposed bans or implementing 100% sales of zero-emissions vehicles include China (including Hong Kong and Macau), Japan, Singapore, the UK, South Korea, Iceland, Denmark, Sweden, Slovenia, Germany, Italy, France, Belgium, the Netherlands, Portugal, Canada, the 12 US states that adhered to California's Zero-Emission Vehicle (ZEV) Program, Sri Lanka, Cabo Verde, and Costa Rica.

Countries that have already reached near 100% zero-emissions vehicles are Norway and Ethiopia.

Map of proposed and implemented bans: 2020s 2030s 2040s 2050s

Country	Start year	Status	Scope	Details
Armenia	2040	Signatory of the Glasgow Declaration	Emitting	New vehicle sales by 2040 at latest.
Austria	2035	EU regulation	Emitting	New vehicle sales by 2035.
Azerbaijan	2040	Signatory of the Glasgow Declaration	Emitting	New vehicle sales by 2040 at latest.
Belgium	2035	EU regulation	Emitting	New vehicle sales by 2035.
Cambodia	2040	Signatory of the Glasgow Declaration	Emitting	New vehicle sales by 2040 at latest.
Canada	2035 (Note: brought forward 5 years since 2017 announcement)	Climate plan	Diesel, petrol, non-electric	New light-duty vehicle sales.
Cape Verde	2040	Signatory of the Glasgow Declaration	Emitting	New vehicle sales by 2040 at latest.
Chile	2035	Chilean government Green New Deal	Diesel, petrol	New vehicle sales.
People's Republic of China	2035	Government climate plan	Diesel, petrol	New private vehicle sales and registration.
Costa Rica	2050	Proposed by Costa Rica President Carlos Alvarado as a "roadway" in 2019.	Diesel, petrol	New light vehicle sales.
Croatia	2035	EU regulation	Emitting	New vehicle sales by 2035.
Cyprus	2035	EU regulation	Emitting	New vehicle sales by 2035.
Denmark	2035	EU regulation	Diesel, petrol	New vehicle sales by 2035.
Dominican Republic	2040	Signatory of the Glasgow Declaration	Emitting	New vehicle sales by 2040 at latest.
Egypt	2040	Government plan	Diesel, petrol, non-electric	New car sales.
El Salvador	2040	Signatory of the Glasgow Declaration	Emitting	New vehicle sales by 2040 at latest.
Ethiopia	2024	Ethiopia's Transport and Logistics Ministries announcement	Non-electric	New imported vehicles by 2024.
Finland	2035	EU regulation	Emitting	New vehicle sales by 2035.
Germany	2035	EU regulation	Emitting	New vehicle sales by 2035.
Ghana	2040	Signatory of the Glasgow Declaration	Emitting	New vehicle sales by 2040 at latest.
Greece	2035	EU regulation	Emitting	New vehicle sales by 2035.
Holy See	2040	Signatory of the Glasgow Declaration	Emitting	New vehicle sales by 2040 at latest.
Hong Kong (PRC)	2035	Hong Kong Legislature plan, Special Administrative Region of the People's Republic Of China.	Diesel, petrol	New private vehicle sales and registration.
Iceland	2030	climate plan	Cars that run exclusively on Diesel, petrol	New car sales, but with exceptions for regional considerations (areas where it would be difficult to ban petrol or diesel cars).
India	2034 2040	Government plan Signatory of the Glasgow Declaration	Petrol, diesel	New vehicle sales.
Indonesia	2050	Proposed by the Government as a "roadway" in 2021	Diesel, petrol	All motorcycle sales (2040), all car sales (2050).
Ireland	2035	EU regulation	Emitting	New vehicle sales by 2035.
Israel	2030	Pledge by the Minister of Energy, partially adopted in a Government proposal Signatory of the Glasgow Declaration	Emitting, non-electric	New car sales, newly imported vehicles.
Italy	2035	EU regulation	Emitting	New vehicle sales by 2035.
Japan	2035	Japanese government plan	cease sales of new Diesel-, petrol-only cars	Diesel and petrol hybrid cars to continue to be sold indefinitely.
Kenya	2040	Signatory of the Glasgow Declaration	Emitting	New vehicle sales by 2040 at latest.
Republic of Korea	2035	Government climate plan	Petrol, diesel	New vehicle sales.
Liechtenstein	2040	Signatory of the Glasgow Declaration	Emitting	New vehicle sales by 2040 at latest.
Lithuania	2035	EU regulation	Emitting	New vehicle sales by 2035.
Luxembourg	2035	EU regulation	Emitting	New vehicle sales by 2035.
Macau (PRC)	2035	Macau Legislature plan, Special Administrative Region of the People's Republic Of China.	Diesel, petrol	New private vehicle sales and registration.
Malaysia	2050	Malaysia Net-Zero Emission by 2050	Emitting	New vehicle sales by 2050 at latest.
Malta	2035	EU regulation	Emitting	New vehicle sales by 2035.
Mexico	2040	Signatory of the Glasgow Declaration	Emitting	New vehicle sales by 2040 at latest.
Morocco	2040	Signatory of the Glasgow Declaration	Emitting	New vehicle sales by 2040 at latest.
Netherlands	2035	EU regulation	Emitting	New vehicle sales by 2035.
New Zealand	2040	Signatory of the Glasgow Declaration	Emitting	New vehicle sales by 2040 at latest.
Pakistan	2040	National Electric Vehicles Policy (NEVP)	Emitting	90 percent of the new vehicle sales by 2040 at latest.
Paraguay	2040	Signatory of the Glasgow Declaration	Emitting	New vehicle sales by 2040 at latest.
Poland	2035	EU regulation	Emitting	New vehicle sales by 2035.
Portugal	2035	EU regulation	Emitting	New vehicle sales by 2035.
Rwanda	2040	Signatory of the Glasgow Declaration	Emitting	New vehicle sales by 2040 at latest.
Singapore	2023 (public sector vehicles) 1 January 2025 (Diesel-only Cars and Taxis) 2025 (Non-electric airside light vehicles) 2030 (petrol-only and diesel-only vehicles)	February 2021 climate plan, brought forward ten years earlier since 2020 announcement.	Petrol, diesel, non-electrified	All new cars procured and registered by the public sector will be clean energy vehicles with zero tailpipe emissions from 2023 onwards with all non-zero tailpipe emission public sector vehicles to be phased out by 2035. All new airside light vehicles to be of fully electric models from 2025 onwards. Sales and registration of all new diesel-only cars and taxis discontinued since 1 January 2025. Sales and registration of all new diesel-only commercial vehicles and petrol-only vehicles to cease by 2030. All new vehicles to run on cleaner energy (electric, hybrid, hydrogen fuel cell) from 2030, phase-out of internal combustion engines (from the entire population of motor vehicles) completed by 2040.
Slovenia	2035	EU regulation	Emitting	New vehicle sales by 2035.
Spain	2035	EU regulation	Emitting	New vehicle sales by 2035.
Sweden	2035	EU regulation	Emitting	New vehicle sales by 2035.
Taiwan	2040	Government climate plan announced by the Environmental Protection Administration.	Diesel, petrol	All bus and government-owned car use (2030), all motorcycle sales (2035), all car sales (2040).
Thailand	2035	Only proposals of National Electric Vehicle Policy Committee, not yet effective in any way.	Diesel, petrol	New car sales and new car registration.
Turkey	2040	Signatory of the Glasgow Declaration and declaration on lorries and buses	Emitting	New vehicle sales by 2040 at latest.
Ukraine	2040	Signatory of the Glasgow Declaration	Emitting	New vehicle sales by 2040 at latest.
United Kingdom	2030 2035, 2040	Government plan	Diesel, petrol	New hybrid cars can be sold until 2035, but sales of those powered only by petrol or diesel is banned from 2030. However smaller British firms are allowed to sell petrol cars beyond 2030. Sale of diesel lorries and buses is banned from 2040.
Uruguay	2040	Signatory of the Glasgow Declaration	Emitting	New vehicle sales by 2040 at latest.
Vietnam	2040–2050	Program of Ministry of Transport of Vietnam; Vietnam Government Decision No. 876/QD-TTg, dated 22 July 2022	Emitting	All vehicles on road must use electricity or net-zero fuel from 2050.

Some politicians in some countries have made broad announcements but have implemented no legislation and therefore there is no phase-out and no binding legislation. Ireland, for example, had made announcements but ultimately did not ban diesel nor petrol vehicles.

The International Energy Agency predicted in 2021 that 70% of India's new car sales will be fossil powered in 2030, despite earlier government announcements that were discarded in 2018. In November 2021, the Indian government was amongst 30 national governments and six major automakers who pledged to phase out the sale of all new petrol and diesel vehicles by 2040 worldwide, and by 2035 in "leading markets".

=== Cities and territories ===
European emission standards
(older)	1992	1996	2000	2005	2009	2014
Euro 0	Euro 1	Euro 2	Euro 3	Euro 4	Euro 5	Euro 6

Some cities or territories have planned or taken measures to partially or entirely phase out fossil fuel vehicles earlier than their national governments. In some cases, this is achieved through local or regional government initiatives, in other cases through legal challenges brought on by citizens or civil organisations enforcing partial phase-outs based on the right to clean air.

Some cities listed have signed the Fossil Fuel Free Streets Declaration, committing to banning emitting vehicles by 2030, but this does not necessarily have the force of law in those jurisdictions. The bans typically apply to a select number of streets in the urban centre of the city where most people live, not to its entire territory. Some cities take a gradual approach to prohibit the most polluting categories of vehicles first, then the next-most polluting, all the way up to a complete ban on all fossil-fuel vehicles; some cities have not yet set a deadline for a complete ban, and/or are waiting for the national government to set such a date.

In California, emissions requirements for automakers to be permitted to sell any vehicles in the state were expected to force 15% of new vehicles offered for sale between 2018 and 2025 to be zero emission. Much cleaner emissions and increased efficiency in petrol engines mean this will be met with just 8% of ZEV vehicles. The "Ditching Dirt Diesel" law SB 44 sponsored by Nancy Skinner and adopted on 20 September 2019 requires the California Air Resources Board (CARB) to "create a comprehensive strategy for deploying medium- and heavy-duty vehicles" to make California meet federal ambient air quality standards, and 'establish goals and spur technology advancements for reducing GHG emissions from the medium- and heavy-duty vehicle sectors by 2030 and 2050'. It stops short of directly requiring a phase-out of all diesel vehicles by 2050 (as the original bill did), but it would be the most obvious means of achieving the reduction goals. In August 2022, California Governor Gavin Newsom signed off on a new EV mandate. The plan's targets are 35% ZEV market share by 2026, 68% by 2030, and 100% by 2035. This plan is accompanied by supporting funding for infrastructure and ZEV rebates totaling $10 billion. Newsom has stated his commitment to keep California at the forefront of zero-emission transportation.

In the European Union, Council Directive 96/62/EC on ambient air quality assessment and management and Directive 2008/50/EC on ambient air quality form the legal basis for EU citizens' right to clean air. On 25 July 2008 in the case Dieter Janecek v Freistaat Bayern CURIA, the European Court of Justice ruled that under Directive 96/62/EC citizens have the right to require national authorities to implement a short-term action plan that aims to maintain or achieve compliance to air quality limit values. The ruling of the German Federal Administrative Court in Leipzig on 5 September 2013 significantly strengthened the right of environmental associations and consumer protection organisations to sue local authorities to enforce compliance with air quality limits throughout an entire city. The Administrative Court of Wiesbaden declared on 30 June 2015 that financial or economic aspects were not a valid excuse to refrain from taking measures to ensure that the limit values were observed, the Administrative Court of Düsseldorf ruled on 13 September 2016 that driving bans on certain diesel vehicles were legally possible to comply with the limit values as quickly as possible, and on 26 July 2017, the Administrative Court of Stuttgart ordered the state of Baden-Württemberg to consider a year-round ban on diesel-powered vehicles. By mid-February 2018, citizens in the EU member states the Czech Republic, France, Germany, Hungary, Italy, Romania, Slovakia, Spain, and the United Kingdom were suing their governments for violating the limit of 40 micrograms per cubic meter of breathable air as stipulated in the Ambient Air Quality Directive.

A landmark ruling by the German Federal Administrative Court in Leipzig on 27 February 2018 declared that the cities of Stuttgart and Düsseldorf were allowed to legally prohibit older, more polluting diesel vehicles from driving in zones worst affected by pollution, rejecting appeals made by German states against the bans imposed by the two cities' local courts. The case was strongly influenced by the ongoing Volkswagen emissions scandal (also known as Dieselgate), which in 2015 revealed that many Volkswagen diesel engines were deceptively tested and marketed as much cleaner than they were. The decision was predicted to set a precedent for other places in the country and in Europe. Indeed, the ruling triggered a wave of dozens of local diesel restrictions, brought about by Environmental Action Germany (DUH) suing city authorities and winning legal challenges across Germany. While some groups and parties such as the AfD again tried to overturn them, others such as the Greens advocated for a national phaseout of diesel cars by 2030. On 13 December 2018, the European Court of Justice overturned a 2016 European Commission relaxation of car NO_{x} emission limits to 168 mg/km, which the Court declared illegal. This allowed the cities of Brussels, Madrid, and Paris, who had filed the complaint, to proceed with their plans to also reject Euro 6 diesel vehicles from their urban centres, based on the original 80 mg/km limit set by EU law. (Note: The 80 mg/km limit is defined in Regulation (EC) No 692/2008, Table 2 of Annex XVII and Footnote 1 of Annex XI. The European Court of Justice ruled that the European Commission illegally circumvented this limit by introducing a 'temporary conformity factor of 2,1 (...) to allow manufacturers to gradually adapt to the RDE [Real Driving Emissions] rules' in Regulation (EU) 2016/646, Preamble 10 and Annex II '2.1.2 Temporary conformity factors'. This meant 2.1 times 80 mg/km = 168 mg/km.)

City or territory	Country	Ban announced	Ban commences	Scope	Details
Aachen	Germany	2018	2019	Diesel	Older diesel vehicles (2019), unless pollution reduces.
Amsterdam	Netherlands	2019	2030	Diesel, petrol	Euro I–III diesel cars (2020), non-electric buses (2022), pleasure crafts and (light) mopeds (2025), all vehicles (2030).
Antwerp	Belgium	2016	2017–2020	Diesel, lpg, petrol	Euro I–II diesels and 0 petrol/lpg (2017), Euro III diesels and 1 petrol/lpg (2020)
Arnhem	Netherlands	2013, 2018	2014–2019	Diesel	Euro I–III diesel trucks (2014), all Euro I–III diesel vehicles (2019)*. (Note: Access for banned diesel vehicles is only possible by buying a one-day exemption for 36 euros, which the owner is allowed to do up to 12 times (a year?). Old diesel cars for transporting disabled people are exempt.)
Athens	Greece	2021	2021	All vehicles	Cars with even number plate can only enter on even days (the inverse for odd); electric, natural gas, autogas, hybrid and diesel Euro 6 (<120 g/km CO2) vehicles exempt from this system.
Auckland	New Zealand	2017	2030	Diesel, petrol	All vehicles, electric buses by 2025.
Australian Capital Territory	Australia	2022	2035	Fossil fuels	All new light fossil fuel vehicles from 2035 encompassing passenger cars, motorcycles and small trucks. This policy forms part of the ACT Government's Zero Emissions Vehicles Strategy 2022–30. The Strategy also targets 80–90% of new light vehicles sold by 2030 to be zero-emission models.
Balearic Islands	Spain	2018	2025–2035	Diesel, petrol	All vehicles.
Barcelona	Spain	2017	2030	Diesel, petrol	All vehicles, electric buses by 2025.
Berlin	Germany	2018	2019	Diesel	Euro I–V diesel vehicles (2019).
Bonn	Germany	2018	2019	Diesel	Older diesel vehicles (2019).
Bristol	United Kingdom	2019	2021	Diesel	All private vehicles (city center from 7 am to 3 pm).
British Columbia	Canada	2018	2025	Diesel, petrol	All vehicles by 2040, 10% ZEVs by 2025.
Brussels Region	Belgium	2018	2030–2035	Diesel, petrol	Euro 0–I diesels (2018), Euro II diesels and 0–1 petrols (2019), Euro III diesels (2020), Euro IV diesels (2022), Euro V diesels and Euro 2 petrol (2026), all diesels (2030), all petrol vehicles (2035).
California	United States	2020	2035	Net-emitting vehicles	All passenger vehicles and light-duty trucks.
Cape Town	South Africa	2017	2030	Diesel, petrol	All vehicles, electric buses by 2025.
Cologne	Germany	2018	2019	Diesel	Older diesel vehicles (2019).
Connecticut	United States	2022	2035	Non-electric vehicles	New vehicle sales.
Copenhagen	Denmark	2017	2030	Diesel, petrol	All vehicles, electric buses by 2025.
Darmstadt	Germany	2018	2019	Diesel	Euro I–V diesel vehicles on two streets (2019).
Düsseldorf	Germany	2013	2014	Diesel, petrol	Euro I–III diesel vehicles and Euro 0 petrol vehicles (2014).
Eindhoven	Netherlands	2020	2030	Diesel, petrol	Euro I–III diesel trucks (2007), Euro I–III diesel buses (2021), Euro IV diesel trucks (2022), all Euro IV diesel vehicles (2025), all vehicles (2030).
Essen	Germany	2018	2030	Diesel	Older diesel vehicles.
Frankfurt	Germany	2018	2019	Diesel	Euro I–V diesel vehicles and Euro 1–2 petrol vehicles (2019).
Gelsenkirchen	Germany	2018	2025	Diesel	Older diesel vehicles.
Ghent	Belgium	2016	2020	Diesel, lpg, petrol	Euro I–III diesel and 1 petrol/lpg (2020)*. (Note: From 2020 on, vehicles are gradually prohibited from most to least polluting; banned vehicles can only get temporary access by buying Low Emission Zone (LEZ) day ticket, which the owner is allowed to do up to 8 times a year.)
Hainan	China	2018	2030	Diesel, petrol	All vehicles.
Hawaii	United States	2022	2035	Non-electric vehicles	New vehicle sales.
Hamburg	Germany	2018	2018	Diesel	Euro I–V diesel vehicles in one street, older diesel trucks in another street (2020).
Heidelberg	Germany	2017	2030	Diesel, petrol	All vehicles, electric buses by 2025.
Lausanne	Switzerland	2021	2030	Thermic vehicles	Zero mobility-related direct emissions.
Lombardy	Italy	2018	2019–2020	Diesel, petrol	Euro I–III diesel and Euro 1 petrol (1 April 2019), Euro IV diesel (1 October 2020).
London	United Kingdom	2017	2020–2030	Diesel, petrol	All vehicles, electric buses by 2025 (two zero emissions zones by 2022).
Los Angeles	United States	2017	2030	Diesel, petrol	All vehicles, electric buses by 2025.
Madrid	Spain	2016	2025	Diesel	Euro I–III diesel and Euro 1–2 petrol vehicles (2018), all vehicles (2025).
Maine	United States	2022	2030	Non-electric vehicles	New vehicle sales, rejected by state regulators.
Massachusetts	United States	2020	2035	Diesel, petrol	Will set equivalent regulations to match California's Advanced Clean Cars Program.
Mainz	Germany	2018	2019	Diesel, petrol	Euro I–III diesel vehicles and Euro 0 petrol vehicles (2019).
Mexico City	Mexico	2016	2025	Diesel	All vehicles.
Milan	Italy	2017	2030	Diesel	All diesel vehicles, electric buses by 2025.
Moscow	Russia	2012, 2019	2013–2021	Non-electric	Euro I–IV bus purchases (2013), all non-electric bus purchases (2021), Euro I–III vehicles (20??), all non-electric vehicles (20??).
Munich	Germany	2011	2012	Diesel, petrol	2e.
New Jersey	United States	2023	2035	Net-emitting vehicles	New vehicle sales.
New Mexico	United States	2022	2026	Non-electric vehicles	New vehicle sales.
New York State	United States	2021	2035	Non-ZEV vehicles	New passenger cars and trucks and off-road vehicles and equipment.
New York City	United States	2020	2040	Non-electric vehicles	All vehicles owned or operated by New York City.
Nijmegen	Netherlands	2018	2021	Diesel	Euro I–III diesel cars (2021).
North Carolina	United States	2022	2035	Non-electric vehicles	New vehicle sales.
Oregon	United States	2021	2030	All vehicles	Gas cars (2025), gas trucks (2030).
Oxford	United Kingdom	2017	2020–2035	Diesel, petrol	All vehicles (initially during daytime hours on six streets).
Paris	France	2016	2025	All vehicles	Crit'air 3 and lower.
Quito	Ecuador	2017	2030	Diesel, petrol	All vehicles, electric buses by 2025.
Rhode Island	United States	2022	2035	Non-electric vehicles	New vehicle sales.
Rome	Italy	2018	2024	Diesel	All vehicles, only from historical center.
Rotterdam	Netherlands	2015	2016	Diesel	Euro I–III diesel trucks (2016). Other bans were dropped in 2019.
Seattle	United States	2017	2030	Diesel, petrol	All vehicles, electric buses by 2025.
Stockholm	Sweden	2017	2020–2022	Diesel, petrol	Euro I–IV vehicles (2020), Euro V vehicles (2022) on one street
Stuttgart	Germany	2018	2019–2020	Diesel	Euro I–IV diesel vehicles (2019), Euro V diesel vehicles (2020).
The Hague	Netherlands	2019	2030	Diesel, petrol	Two-stroke mopeds (2020), Euro I–III diesel vehicles (2021), all vehicles (2030).
Utrecht	Netherlands	2013, 2020	2030	Diesel, petrol	Pre-2001 diesel vehicles from 2015, pre-2004 diesels from 2021, pre-2009 (Euro I–IV) diesels from 2025, all vehicles from 2030.
Vancouver	Canada	2017	2030	Diesel, petrol	All vehicles, electric buses by 2025.
Vermont	United States	2022	2035	Non-electric vehicles	New vehicle sales.
Washington	United States	2021	2030	Emitting	New car sales (2030), new truck sales (2030).
Wiesbaden	Germany	2018	2019	Diesel, petrol	Euro I–III diesel vehicles and Euro 0 petrol vehicles (2019).

== Manufacturer fossil-fuel phase-out plans ==
Sales of electric vehicles (EVs) indicate a trend away from gas-powered vehicles that generate greenhouse gases.

In 2017, Volvo announced plans to phase out internal combustion-only vehicle production by 2019, after which all new cars manufactured by Volvo will either be fully electric or electric hybrids. In 2020, the Volvo Group with other truck makers including DAF Trucks, Daimler AG, Ford, Iveco, MAN SE, and Scania AB pledged to end diesel truck sales by 2040.

In 2018, Volkswagen Group's strategy chief said "the year 2026 will be the last product start on a combustion engine platform" for its core brand, Volkswagen.

In 2021, General Motors announced plans to go fully electric by 2035. In the same year, the CEO of Jaguar Land Rover, Thierry Bolloré, also claimed it would "achieve zero tailpipe emissions by 2036" and that its Jaguar brand would be electric-only by 2025. By March, Volvo Cars announced that by 2030 it "intends to only sell fully electric cars and phase out any car in its global portfolio with an internal combustion engine, including hybrids," however, in 2024, pulled back its all-electric plans. In April 2021, Honda announced that it will stop selling gas-powered vehicles by 2040. In July 2021, Mercedes-Benz announced that its new vehicle platforms will be EV-only by 2025. In October 2021, Rolls-Royce announced that it will be fully electric by 2030, though in 2026, pulled back these plans due to a lack of demand. In November 2021, at 2021 United Nations Climate Change Conference, car manufacturers including BYD Auto, Ford Motor Company, General Motors, Jaguar, Land Rover, Mercedes-Benz, and Volvo have committed to "work towards all sales of new cars and vans being zero emission globally by 2040, and by no later than 2035 in leading markets".

In 2022, Maserati announced its plans to offer full-electric variants of all its models by 2025 and its intention to halt production of combustion engine vehicles by 2030.

In 2023, Nissan announced the commitment to end combustion engine vehicle sales in Europe by 2030.

The following table shows manufacturer pledges of the top global automaker corporations.

#	Manufacturer	Vehicles 2023	Country	Pledge	Details
1.	Toyota	10,307,395	Japan	No pledge	Expects to make 3.5m EVs per year by 2030.
2.	Volkswagen	9,239,575	Germany	2040	Pledged to make 25% EVs by 2025. Expects to make 50% EVs by 2030 and 100% by 2040.
3.	Hyundai Kia	7,302,451	South Korea	No pledge	Plans to be one of top-three EV manufacturers by 2030. Genesis will become 100% all-electric by 2030.
4.	Stellantis	6,392,600	Euro-American	~~2030, Europe only~~	Formerly Fiat-Chrysler. ~~Plan for 100% EV in Europe by 2030, and 50% in the US by 2030~~.
5.	General Motors	6,188,476	US	~~2035~~	~~Cadillac and Buick to become 100% all-electric by 2030. Chevrolet and GMC to become 100% all-electric by 2035.~~
6.	Ford	4,413,545	US	No pledge	50% of Ford vehicle sales will be electric by 2030, and 100% of all Lincoln vehicle sales along with 100% of all Ford Europe sales will be electric by 2030.
7.	Honda	4,188,039	Japan	~~2040~~	~~Plan for 40% sales to be EVs by 2030, and 100% by 2040.~~ This rolls back previous suggestion of going all-electric by 2030.
8.	Nissan	3,374,271	Japan	No pledge	Plan for 40% of US Nissan sales and 100% of Infiniti sales to be electric by 2030. Plan for 100% of European sales to be electric by 2030.
9.	BMW	2,555,341	Germany	No pledge	Mini all electric by 2030. BMW 50% electric by 2030.
10.	Changan	2,553,052	China	2025, partly	Changan pledges are for all electric vehicles, however, many remain hybrid.
11.	Mercedes-Benz	2,493,177	Germany	2030, with exceptions	Despite its 2030 pledge, Mercedes says it may sell fossil fuel vehicles in markets that need it.
12.	Renault	2,235,345	France	2030	100% electric by 2030, and aim for 100% clean energy production by 2040.
13.	Suzuki	2,066,219	Japan	No pledge	Only launched first electric car in 2025, the e Vitara.
14.	Tesla, Inc.	1,808,581	US	100% already	Tesla is an entirely electric carmaker.
15.	Geely	1,686,516	China	~~2030~~	~~Pledge for Volvo to be all electric by 2030.~~ Aim for 50% sales in 2023 to be electric.

== Electric vehicle market shares by country ==
The sale of 5% electric vehicles is commonly regarded as a "tipping point" at which sales are likely to continually increase on a standard "S curve" pattern. In early 2024, 32 countries (including most EU countries, China, the US and Japan) had reached well over 5% of the market as electric, 15 countries were over 20%, and two were over 50%.

#	Country	EV sales in Q4 2023	Market share	When 5% reached
1.	Norway	25,028	79.6%	2013 Q3
2.	Iceland	3,507	58.4%	2019 Q1
3.	Denmark	21,890	44.9%	2020 Q3
4.	Sweden	31,780	39.8%	2020 Q1
5.	Finland	6,686	35.3%	2020 Q4
6.	Netherlands	29,199	35.1%	2018 Q4
7.	Ireland	1,164	33.9%	2019 Q4
8.	Belgium	25,752	25.3%	2021 Q3
9.	Portugal	11,265	24.3%	2020 Q4
10.	Switzerland	16,581	23.9%	2020 Q1
11.	China	1,879,600	23.8%	2020 Q4
12.	Austria	13,083	23.3%	2020 Q3
13.	Israel	6,772	22.9%	2021 Q3
14.	France	98,755	20.3%	2020 Q1
15.	New Zealand	7,435	20.0%	2021 Q3
16.	Germany	138,390	19.6%	2020 Q3
17.	United Kingdom	79,602	17.6%	2020 Q2
18.	Thailand	23,864	12.6%	2023 Q1
19.	Turkey	36,026	12.0%	2023 Q3
20.	Romania	3,655	10.8%	2021 Q4
21.	Slovenia	1,126	10.7%	2022 Q4
22.	Australia	21,571	9.5%	2022 Q3
23.	Canada	38,160	9.4%	2022 Q1
24.	Spain	20,666	8.7%	2022 Q4
25.	United States	313,822	8.1%	2021 Q4
26.	Estonia	400	7.5%	2023 Q2
27.	South Korea	36,009	6.9%	2021 Q3
28.	Hungary	1,614	6.5%	2022 Q4
29.	Bulgaria	551	5.8%	2023 Q4
30.	Italy	21,033	5.4%	2023 Q4
31.	Greece	1,579	5.3%	2023 Q2
32.	Japan	53,000	5.1%	2024 Q2
–	Global total	3,008,662	14.5	2021 Q2

== Railways ==
- Germany: While railway electrification is often pursued for reasons unrelated to the emissions caused by fossil fuels, there has been an increased push in the 21st century in countries such as Germany to replace diesel locomotives with alternatives such as battery electric multiple units, hydrogen fuel trains like the Alstom Coradia iLint or overhead wire electrification.
- Switzerland: pursued electrification because importing coal for steam locomotives had proven difficult during the World Wars but Switzerland has plenty of domestic hydropower resources to power electric trains.
- Israel: Israel Railways which had no electrified mainline rail services prior to 2018 when the Tel Aviv-Jerusalem railway became the first line to see electric train operation, plans to electrify most (Note: There is still no clear decision whether the old Jaffa-Jerusalem railway is to be electrified, shut down, kept as a heritage railway or converted to hydrogen fuel or battery-electric operation) or all of its network and to phase out diesel locomotives and diesel multiple units. The project was further accelerated in 2020 as the temporary shutdown of rail traffic due to the COVID-19 pandemic in Israel allowed faster construction and ERTMS level 2 was being rolled out. However, in 2019 Israel Railways ordered diesel powered rolling stock to replace the ageing IC3 trains with media reports citing delays in the electrification program as the main reason.
- United States: In the San Francisco Bay Area, the Caltrain Electrification program approved in 2016 is nearing completion. Caltrain is the commuter rail line generally connecting San Francisco to San Jose through San Mateo County. Despite having no electric locomotives previously, Caltrain's infrastructure has successfully implemented electric support. Funding was awarded in 2018, and train assembly and testing completed in 2022. In a multi-stage phase out plan, the new electric train cars will supplement and eventually replace diesel powered locomotives by 2024.
- Netherlands: Most railway lines in the Netherlands were equipped with overhead wires just before or just after World War II, allowing electric trains to start running. Many regional railway lines did not receive such overhead wires, so diesel trains still run there today. As of April 2024, three regional railway lines are being electrified; a further 400 kilometres of rail is still transporting passengers with diesel locomotives.

== Shipping ==
Emissions will be banned from Norway's World Heritage Sites Geirangerfjord and Nærøyfjord from 2026.

Besides boats driven by batteries or indeed trolley boats, there have been several attempts to adapt nuclear marine propulsion which has been a part of the military naval forces of many countries for decades in the form of nuclear submarines, nuclear aircraft carriers and nuclear icebreakers to civilian uses. While prototypes like Otto Hahn (ship) (German) NS Savannah (American) and RV Mirai (Japan) were built, the only non-icebreaker nuclear powered ship to remain in civilian service is the Russian Sevmorput built in the late 1980s by the Soviet Union. The Soviet Union and its successor state Russia also maintains a fleet of nuclear icebreakers to keep the Northern Sea Route open.

Sail ships and oars rely on renewable resources rather than fossil fuels (wind and human muscle-power respectively) but have disadvantages in terms of speed and labour-costs and have thus been phased out of virtually all commercial uses. There are some attempts to use wind-powered ships for commercial purposes, but as of 2022 they have remained marginal.

Alternative fuels are being explored more and more as part of the decarbonization of the maritime freight sector. For example, methanol has become known as a feasible transition fuel: it can be used in dual-fuel engines and, when manufactured from renewable electricity, hydrogen and captured CO2 as "e-methanol", can offer considerable greenhouse gas reductions when compared to traditional heavy fuel oil. Meanwhile, ammonia is under active development as a zero-carbon fuel alternative in its "e-ammonia" form, which contains no carbon atoms and thus emits no CO2 at the time of combustion. Although numerous infrastructure, safety, and cost-challenges remain, the commercial shipping industry anticipates ammonia-fueled vessels to enter service in the coming years.

Energy conservation and efficiency measures are also key to reducing shipping emissions. A widely adopted practice is slow steaming: reducing a ship's cruising speed can yield major fuel savings since fuel consumption is roughly proportional to the cube of the speed. For instance, reducing a ship's cruising speed from 27 to 18 knots can cut consumption by ~50% or more. Another rising technology is wind-assisted propulsion, notably via Flettner rotors, which are vertical spinning cylinders that harness the Magnus effect to generate thrust. Trials and retrofits show fuel savings of at least 10% when Flettner rotors are applied, and that the technology is gaining wider uptake.

== Aviation ==
Norway, and possibly some other Scandinavian countries, are aiming for all domestic flights to be emission-free by 2040. A major obstacle to decarbonising air travel is the low energy density of current and foreseeable battery technology. Thus alternatives to electric planes such as so called sustainable aviation fuels or e-fuels (fuels derived from electrochemical conversion of substances like water and carbon dioxide into hydrocarbons) are also proposed as a future replacement of current jet fuels. In 2021 the first production scale plant for e-fuels to be used in aviation opened in northern Germany. Production capacity is planned to reach 8 barrels a day by 2022. Lufthansa will be among the chief users of the synthetic fuel produced in the new facility. Germany's plan to transform aviation to net zero carbon emissions relies heavily on e-fuels.

Besides the need to rapidly scale up currently minuscule production capacity, the main obstacles to wider deployment of sustainable aviation fuels and e-Fuels are their much higher cost in the absence of meaningful carbon pricing in aviation. Furthermore, with current CORSIA regulations for sustainable aviation fuels allowing up to 90% of emissions compared to conventional fuels, even those options are currently far from carbon neutral. However, short haul, low demand routes can be easily flown using electric aircraft, and manufacturers such as Heart Aerospace are planning to introduce them with United Airlines in 2026.

There were attempts at building nuclear-powered aircraft during the Cold War, which unlike nuclear marine propulsion never got very far and were always only proposed for military uses. As of 2022 no country or private enterprise is seriously pursuing nuclear propulsion for passenger aircraft.

== Unintended side-effects ==
=== Second-hand vehicle dumping ===
From the European Union, there is already an export market which includes millions of used cars which are sent to Eastern Europe and the Caucasus, Central Asia and Africa. According to UNECE, the global on-road vehicle fleet is to double by 2050 (from 1.2 billion to 2.5 billion, see introduction), with most future car purchases taking place in developing countries. Some experts predict that the number of vehicles in developing countries will increase four- or five-fold by 2050 (compared to current car use levels), and that the majority of these will be second-hand. There are currently no global or even regional agreements that rationalise and govern the flow of second-hand vehicles. Others say that new electric two-wheelers may sell widely in developing countries as they are affordable.

Internal combustion engine cars that may no longer comply to local environmental standards are exported to developing countries, where legislation on vehicle emissions is often less strict. In addition, in some developing countries, such as Uganda, the average age of a car imported is already 16.5 years and it will likely be driven for another 20 years. In such cases, fuel efficiency levels of these vehicles become worse as they age. In addition, national vehicle inspection requirements vary widely depending on the country.

On the other hand the embodied carbon in a car represents a significant proportion of its lifetime carbon, so extending the life of a vehicle may be carbon efficient.

=== Potential solutions ===
- Export prohibitions: Some propose that the European Union could implement a rule that does not allow the most polluting cars to leave the EU. The European Union itself is of the opinion that it "should stop exporting its waste outside of the EU" and it will therefore "revisit the rules on waste shipments and illegal exports".
- Import prohibitions: This includes used vehicle bans, used vehicle import age limits, taxation and inspection tests as a precondition to vehicle registration.
- Convert fossil fuel vehicles to electric: As of 2021, this is expensive, so it tends to only be done for classic cars.
- Conversion to green hydrogen or biofuels
- Mandatory recycling: The European Commission is considering plans to introduce rules on mandatory recycled content in specific product groups for packaging, vehicles, construction materials and batteries, for instance. The EU announced a new Circular Economy Action Plan in March 2020, and it mentioned that the Commission will also propose to revise the rules on end-of-life vehicles with a view to promoting more circular business models.
- Scrappage programs: Governments can offer a premium to owners to have their fossil fuel vehicles voluntarily scrapped and to buy a cleaner vehicle from that money (if they so choose). For example, the city of Ghent offers a scrapping premium of €1,000 for diesel vehicles and €750 for petrol vehicles; as of December 2019, the city had allocated €1.2 million for this purpose to the scrapping fund.

== Mobility transition ==
In Germany, activists have coined the term Verkehrswende (mobility transition, analogous to "Energiewende", energy transition) for a project of not only changing the motive power of cars (from fossil fuels to renewable power sources) but the entire mobility system to one of walkability, complete streets, public transit, electrified railways and bicycle infrastructure.

There is similar research being done in the United States around the term mobility justice. Geologist Dr. Jason Henderson of University of California, San Francisco argues that supporting electric vehicles while neglecting compact city design and public transportation will lead to car-oriented city design. This comes with numerous sustainability issues that disproportionately affect disadvantaged communities such as environmental gentrification, less low-income housing, and unequal access to the benefits of electric vehicle adoption. In addition, the production of electric vehicles can come at the price of laborers in other countries, and the environmental costs there are seldom taken into account when calculating the environmental benefits of electric vehicles. According to mobility justice critiques, relying primarily on electric vehicles for the phase out of fossil fuels comes at an opportunity cost of investing in other types of sustainable transportation such as bike lanes, safe walking spaces, electric trains, and electric buses.

== See also ==
- Fuel substitution – Fuels from sources other than fossil fuels: central lever to be deployed in decarbonising transport
- Alternative fuel vehicle – Vehicle not powered by petrol or diesel
- Directive 2008/50/EC – EU air-quality directive setting pollution limits
- Electric vehicle conversion: removing the engine of an internal combustion-powered vehicle and replacing it with an electric motor, creating reduced manufacturing emissions (as most car parts are reused) and costs compared to manufacturing/buying a new one
- Electrofuel: a type of synthetic fuel made from electricity (e.g., made using wind, water or solar power), many of which can be burnt in internal combustion engines
- Environmental impact of aviation – Effect of emissions from aircraft engines
- Flexible-fuel vehicle and dual-fuel vehicle: have an internal combustion engine and can run on multiple fuels, sometimes even combining renewable/bio fuels and fossil fuels
- Fossil fuel lobby – Lobbying supporting the fossil fuels industry
- Fuel cell vehicle: vehicles that generate electricity using oxygen from the air and compressed hydrogen
- Hydrogen internal combustion engine vehicle: burns hydrogen in an internal combustion engine
- Leapfrogging – Concept of fast advancement
- Smart mobility – Electric cars, alternatives to cars, rentals
- Short-haul flight ban – Proposed environmental policy
- Coal phase-out – Environmental policy intended to stop using coal
- Fossil fuel phase-out – Gradual reduction of the use and production of fossil fuels
- Phase-out of gas boilers
- Plastic bans – Laws prohibiting the use of polymers manufactured from fossil fuels
