= Elam Stevenson =

American Methodist preacher

Reverend Elam Stevenson was an American Methodist preacher, who ministered during the early 19th century in southern Tennessee. Elam Stevenson was born on September 24, 1787, in North Carolina. In 1805, Elam Stevenson married Lydia Catherine Payne. Lydia was born on August 16, 1787, in Burke County, North Carolina and is the daughter of William Payne and Catherine (Arnold) Payne. Stevenson was a well-respected Methodist minister and founded the Old Bee Spring Methodist Church in rural Bryson TN, where he and his wife are both buried. Elam and Lydia Stevenson lived nearly their entire lives in Bunker Hill, Tennessee. The 'White Frame' Bee Springs Church building (not original) still stands on the grounds and the spring still puts forth fresh cold water to be enjoyed by passers-by. Many ministers of the gospel, including four sons, have proceeded from the lineage of Rev. Stevenson.

Reverend Elam Stevenson was of Scots-Irish descent, being the son of James Stevenson of Iredell, now Alexander County, North Carolina who was a Captain in the American Revolutionary War. Elam was the third son and the first of the family to join the Methodist Church. He professed religion in 1804 and joined the church in 1806. He was much opposed by his parents, who were Presbyterians (being of Scottish heritage), and they honestly thought he was being deceived by the false teachers who were to come in the last days. He was licensed to preach in 1813 and the same year moved to Giles County, Tennessee.

In the Bee Springs Cemetery, Bryson, Tennessee, is the tombstone of the Rev. Elam Stevenson and his wife Lydia. This stone bears the following inscription "Erected to the memory of Reverend ELAM STEVENSON, born September 24, 1787, died March 13, 1875. Nearly 62 years a Minister of the Gospel. He was pure in heart and life". On the reverse side of the same stone appears the following inscription: "Erected to the memory of LYDIA STEVENSON, born August 16, 1787, died March 6, 1872. Nearly 70 years a Methodist. She consecrated her household to God and the Church".
