= Plastic bans =

Laws prohibiting the use of polymers manufactured from fossil fuels

Plastic bans are laws that prohibit the use of polymers manufactured from petroleum or other fossil fuels, given the pollution and threat to biodiversity that they cause. A number of countries have instituted plastic bag bans, and a ban on single-use plastic (such as throw-away forks or plates), and are looking to spread bans to all plastic packaging, plastic clothing (such as polyester and acrylic fiber, or any other form of unnecessary plastic that could be replaced with an easily biodegradable, non-fossil-fuel or non-polluting alternative. Plastics biodegrade over a long period of time and may not biodegrade fully (so that they are absorbed into the ecosystem) leaving traces of microplastics, ranging from 450 years for a PET plastic bottle (type 1) to thousands of years or "forever" for polypropylene-based products, including food containers (type 5). Plastic bans are particularly initiated to stop or reduce pollution. Pollution is one of the large factors for plastic bans. It also can damage the internal digestive tracts of animals. Another big factor is animals getting ensnared in plastic, which, in turn results in animal population being reduced.

== Plastic bag bans ==
Phase out of lightweight plastic bags around the world (laws passed but not yet in effect are not shown on map): Plastic bags banned Charge on some plastic bags Voluntary charge agreement Partial charge or ban (municipal or regional levels)

== Single-use plastic bans ==
Many jurisdictions have moved beyond simple bag bans to prohibit a wider range of single-use plastic items, such as straws, cutlery, and styrofoam containers.

The European Union's Single-Use Plastics Directive (2019/904) banned the placement on the market of single-use plastic plates, cutlery, straws, balloon sticks, and cotton buds by July 2021. The directive also applies to cups and food and beverage containers made of expanded polystyrene, and all products made of oxo-degradable plastic.

In Canada, the Single-use Plastics Prohibition Regulations were published in June 2022. The regulations prohibit the manufacture, import, and sale of six categories of single-use plastics: checkout bags, cutlery, foodservice ware made from problematic plastics (such as polystyrenes and black plastic), ring carriers, stir sticks, and most straws. Implementation was phased in, with a ban on manufacture and import for sale effective December 2022, and a full ban on sales effective December 2023.

Kenya, which implemented a strict ban on plastic bags in 2017, expanded its prohibitions in June 2020 to ban all single-use plastics - including water bottles and disposable plates - in protected areas such as national parks, beaches, forests, and conservation areas.

From October 2023, the UK government banned specific single-use plastics in England, including plastic plates, trays, bowls, cutlery, balloon sticks, and certain types of polystyrene food containers. China has also instituted a phased-in program of plastic bans from 2020 to 2025, targeting items such as bags, straws, and cutlery in major cities before expanding nationwide.

Internationally, the United Nations Environment Assembly mandated the creation of a legally binding Global Plastics Treaty However, negotiations at the resumed fifth session (INC-5.2) in August 2025 concluded without a final agreement. While the "High Ambition Coalition" - a bloc including the European Union, Rwanda, and over 60 other nations - pushed for binding global bans on high-risk products and caps on virgin plastic production, they were opposed by a "Like-Minded Group" of major petrochemical producers, including Saudi Arabia, Russia, and Iran. These nations blocked consensus, arguing the treaty should focus exclusively on waste management rather than restricting production. Consequently, the session adjourned without a treaty, leaving the future of the global instrument uncertain.

== Plastic packaging and clothing bans ==
Governments are increasingly regulating plastic use in packaging and textiles to address waste and microplastic pollution.

=== Packaging ===
In France, a ban on plastic packaging for fresh fruits and vegetables came into force on 1 January 2022. The law initially applied to approximately 30 types of produce, including cucumbers, peppers, leeks, apples, and pears, with a phased implementation for more delicate items like berries by 2026. The legislation aims to eliminate over 1 billion items of unnecessary plastic packaging annually.

In the European Union, the Packaging and Packaging Waste Regulation (PPWR), adopted in early 2025, sets binding targets to reduce packaging waste. The regulation requires that all packaging on the EU market be recyclable by 2030 and introduces bans on certain single-use packaging formats, such as miniature toiletry bottles in hotels and shrink-wrap for suitcases. It also mandates minimum recycle content in plastic packaging and bans the use of "forever chemicals" (PFAS) in food contact packaging.

=== Clothing and textiles ===
While outright bans on synthetic fibers (such as polyester) are rare, regulations are emerging to limit microfiber pollution and textile waste.

- Microplastics restrictions: In September 2023, the European Commission adopted a restriction under REACH legislation banning "intentionally added" microplastics in products, including glitter and microbeads used in textiles and cosmetics.
- Filtration mandates: To combat unintentional microplastic release during washing, France passed a law requiring all new washing machines sold in the country to be equipped with mandatory microfiber filters starting in January 2025.
- Destruction of unsold goods: The EU's Ecodesign for Sustainable Products Regulation (ESPR) includes a ban on the destruction of unsold textiles and footwear, effectively prohibiting the common fashion industry practice of burning or landfilling excess synthetic inventory. This ban applies to large companies starting in 2026.

== See also ==
- Bioplastic
- Cutlery
- Phase-out of fossil fuels
- Phase-out of fossil fuel vehicles
- Phase-out of gas boilers
- Montreal Protocol
