= Madrid Central =

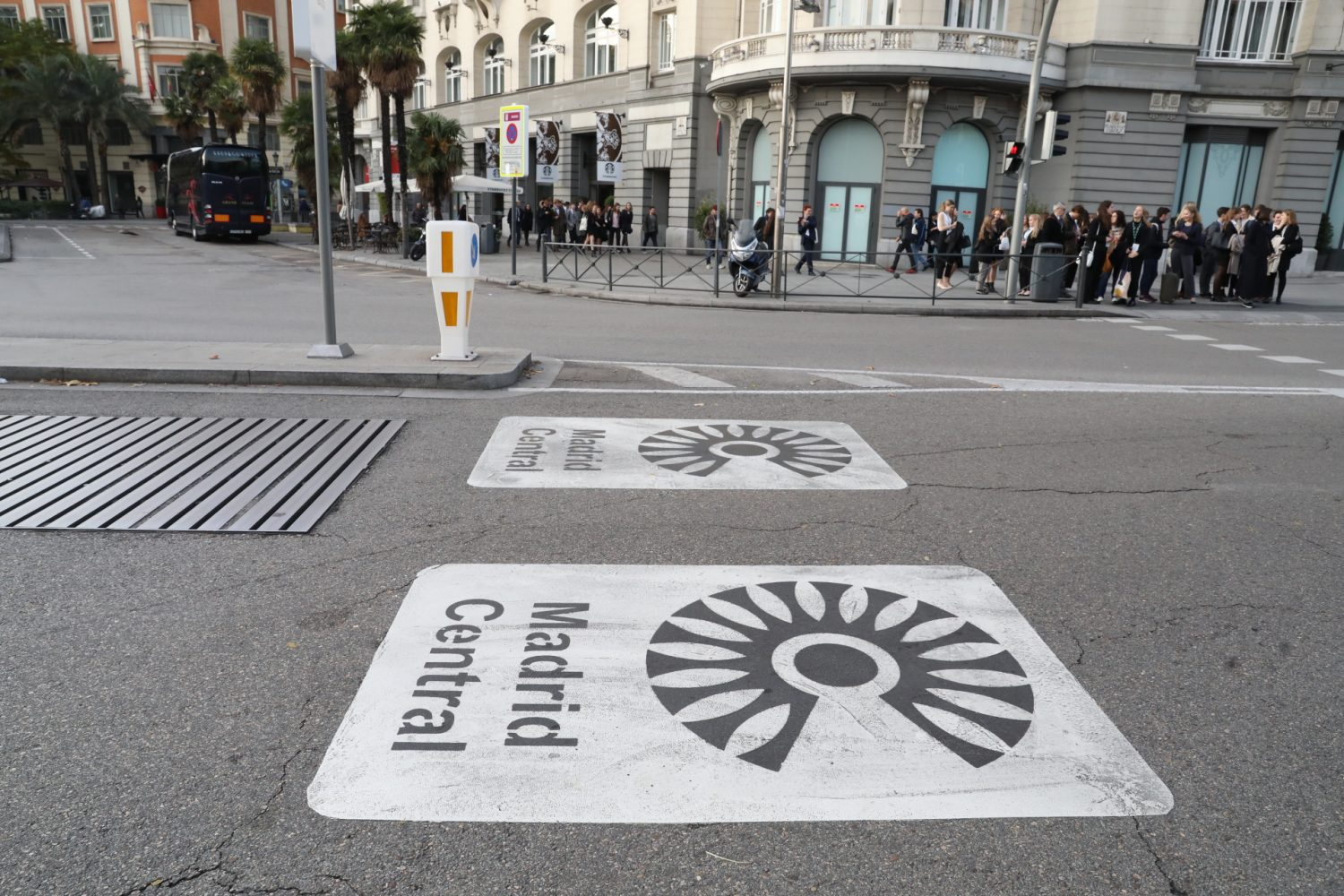
Road markings for Madrid Central, indicating the entrance to its boundaries.

Madrid Central is a low-emission zone located in the center of Madrid. It was inaugurated on November 30, 2018. The project has been something of a political football and as at 2024 has been severely curtailed by a court ruling.

It is aimed at reducing pollution from traffic. There is little industry in the center of the city, and vehicular traffic has been responsible for a significant proportion of emissions there.

Madrid Central was not Spain's first low-emission zone, because Pontevedra had effectively created such a zone by pedestrianising much of its city center. Barcelona announced the implementation of a low emission zone from the beginning of 2020.

== History ==
Prior to the introduction of the Madrid Central scheme, traffic had already been restricted in the city and residents' cars had been given priority for parking in Residential Priority Areas. (Spanish: Área de Prioridad Residencial or APR).

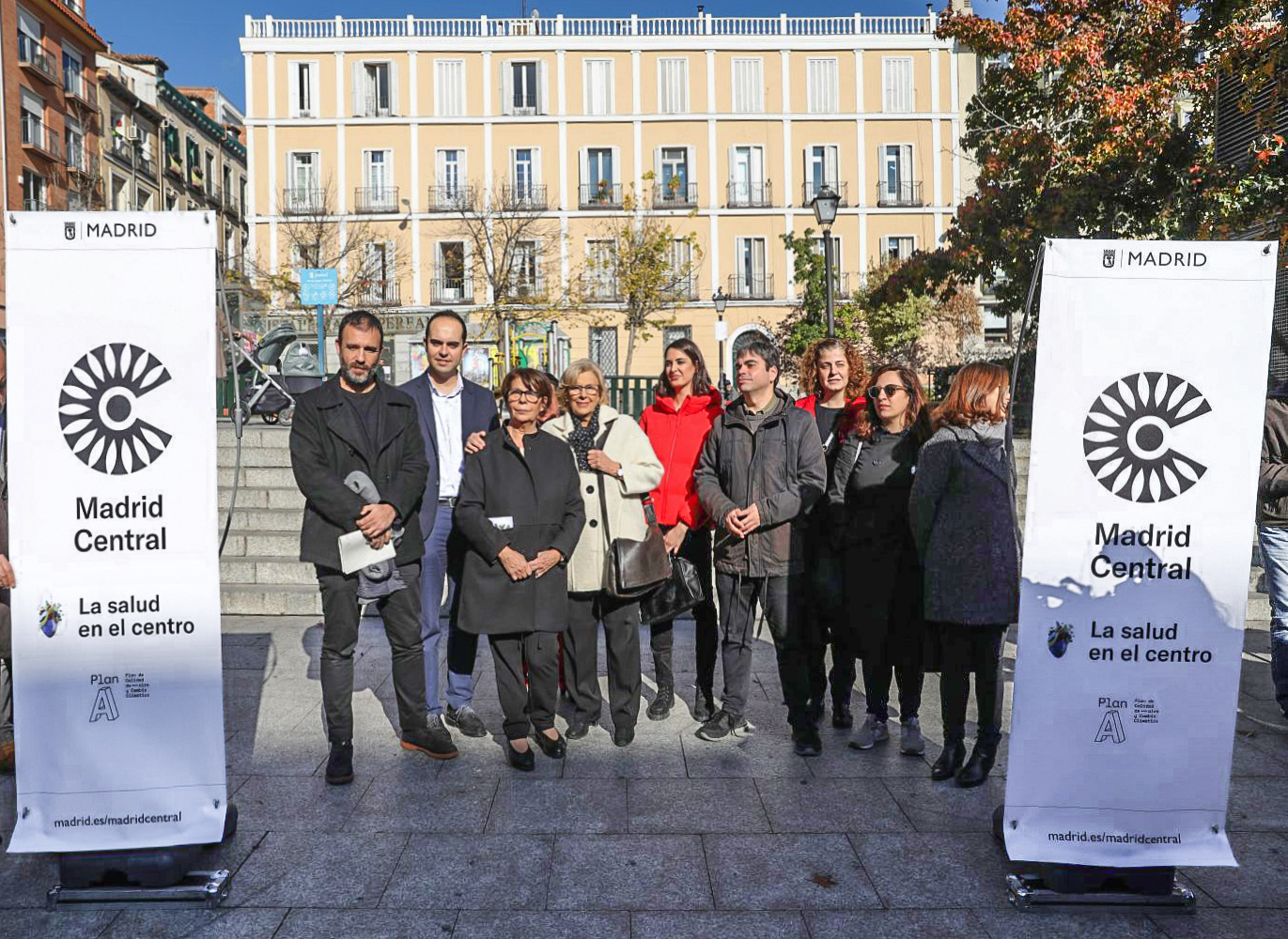
Councilors of the town hall on the day of the inauguration in the Plaza de Pedro Zerolo

Madrid Central was approved by the Governing Board of the City Council of Madrid on October 29, 2018. Its inauguration was initially scheduled for November 23, 2018, but was delayed until November 30, 2018, due to the request of the Business Confederation of Madrid-CEOE so that the implementation of the protocol did not coincide with Black Friday.

With the exception of residents and guests, vehicle traffic was restricted to electric or hybrid vehicles, with a transitory period until 2020 giving additional access of diesel and gasoline vehicles on condition of parking in a parking space.

In March 2019, the Technical University of Madrid published some estimates showing how harmful gas emissions (CO_{2}, NO_{2} ...) had fallen in the area that comprised the Madrid Central area.

Despite the success of the scheme in reducing emissions, during the campaign for the Madrid City Council election in May 2019, the Partido Popular (PP) promised to dismantle Madrid Central, which was associated with the leftist Ahora Madrid party. The PP emerged as the winners in the election, although they had to govern in coalition. In office, the new mayor, José Luis Martínez-Almeida showed some ambivalence towards Madrid Central.

In September 2019 Almeida announced a plan for an alternative to Madrid Central, called Madrid 360. Less ambitious as regards cutting emissions in the center, Madrid 360 would cover a larger area of the city.

=== Coronavirus ===
In March 2020 travel in Madrid was severely restricted by measures to prevent the spread of the coronavirus pandemic in Spain. On 13 March, Prime Minister of Spain Pedro Sánchez announced a declaration of a nationwide State of Alarm for 15 days, to become effective the following day after the approval of the Council of Ministers. This resulted in a decline in air pollution. Working from home became common for many Madrid office workers.

== Perimeter ==
The perimeter of Madrid Central, an area of 472 hectares, is formed by Alberto Aguilera Street, Carranza Street, Sagasta Street, Genoa Street, Paseo de Recoletos, Paseo del Prado, Ronda de Atocha, Ronda de Valencia, round of Toledo, Gran Vía de San Francisco, Bailén street, Plaza de España, Princesa street and Serrano Jover street.
