= Carbon Offsetting and Reduction Scheme for International Aviation =

Voluntary ICAO greenhouse gas emissions scheme

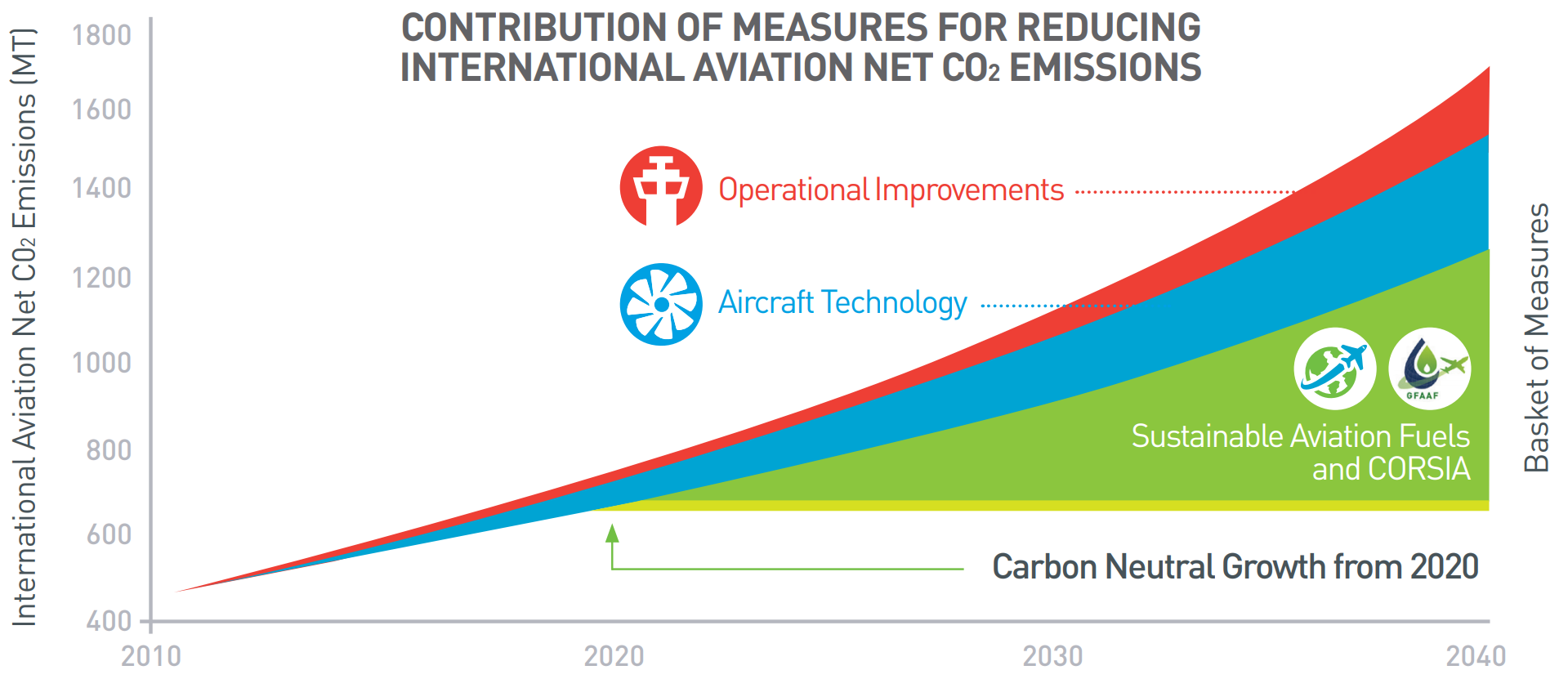
CORSIA scheme

The Carbon Offsetting and Reduction Scheme for International Aviation (CORSIA) is a carbon offset and carbon reduction scheme to lower CO_{2} emissions for international flights and curb the aviation impact on climate change. CORSIA uses market-based environmental policy instruments to offset CO_{2} emissions: aircraft operators have to purchase carbon credits from the carbon market.

It was developed by the International Civil Aviation Organization (ICAO) and adopted in October 2016. Its goal is to have a carbon neutral growth from 2020. Starting in 2021, the scheme is voluntary for all countries until 2027, when it will be made compulsory.

== Background ==
In its first period (2008–2012), the 1997 Kyoto Protocol encompassed CO_{2} emissions from airports and domestic aviation but not from international aviation. In 2009, a number of governments agreed to work on allowing the Kyoto Protocol to reduce and allocate international aviation emissions through the International Civil Aviation Organization. An agreement was not reached during the 2009 Copenhagen climate conference. Failure to implement an agreement that reduces emissions from international aviation could lead to the average global temperature rising above 2 °C.

In 2009, the air transport industry targeted a fuel efficiency improvement of 1.5% per year until 2020, carbon-neutral growth capping CO_{2} emissions from 2020, and halving its CO_{2} emissions by 2050 compared to 2005. In 2010, international flights emitted 458 Mt of carbon dioxide.

== Adoption ==
In October 2016, the 191 nations of the ICAO adopted the scheme, requiring operators to purchase carbon offsets to cover emissions above levels in the year 2020, starting from the year 2021. Additionally, forestry and carbon-reducing activities are to be funded by 2% of the sector annual revenues. CORSIA is voluntary until 2027, but many countries, including the US and China, promised to begin in 2020.

The agreement does not include an objective of containing global warming to 1.5-2 °C, unlike the 2015 Paris climate agreement. CORSIA applies to international flights representing 60% of aviation emissions CORSIA and will regulate 25% of aviation's international emissions. The initial voluntary period involves 65 nations.

Due to the impact of the COVID-19 pandemic on aviation, the value of 2019 emissions will be used for the pilot phase of the CORSIA implementation from 2021 to 2023.

== Implementation ==
On 15 February 2019, the ICAO announced an agreement on alternative fuels to reduce offsets, but details on how to reach the target of halving 2005-level emissions by 2050 remain uncertain. On 18 February, the European Council urged the ICAO to implement CORSIA swiftly and to "agree on a long-term goal at its next assembly" in September.

Beginning in 2019, all ICAO member states "with aeroplane operators conducting international flights are required to monitor, report and verify carbon dioxide emissions from these flights every year". CORSIA is a market based mechanism to offset emissions. Airlines would purchase carbon credits to offset its emissions. The Directorate-General for Mobility and Transport of the European Commission has described it as "a delicate compromise between all involved in its elaboration".

=== Participation ===
As of January 2018, more than 70 countries representing more than 85% of international aviation activity have volunteered to participate. India and Russia are yet to join CORSIA. India, which has four of the five carbon-neutral airports in the Asia-Pacific region and the world's first fully solar powered airport, has drawn attention to "differentiated responsibilities" and the "need to ensure the transfer of financial resources, technology transfer and deployment and capacity building support to developing countries for enabling them to voluntarily undertake action plans".

=== Exemptions ===
Least Developed Countries, Small Island Developing States and Landlocked Developing Countries are not mandated to participate in CORSIA. All aeroplane operators with CO_{2} emissions less than or equal to 10,000 tonnes are exempted from the CORSIA reporting requirements.

Emissions from domestic air travel are not included in CORSIA.

== Criticism ==
In response to CORSIA, advocacy group Transport and Environment argues that CORSIA won't reduce demand for jet fuel, while Greenpeace called it "a timid step in the right direction". Non-governmental organizations formed the Stay Grounded network in various countries during the 2016 ICAO conference. Fifty organisations including Attac Europe, Friends of the Earth International, Global Justice Now, Greenpeace, and the Indigenous Environmental Network, among others, signed a petition against ICAO measures. One hundred organisations, including Greenpeace and Friends of the Earth, signed a civil society statement rejecting ICAO's aviation emissions offset scheme, as it would cause global warming to surpass 1.5 °C.

CORSIA may not be as stringent as the European Union Emission Trading Scheme.

== See also ==
- Bunkers (energy in transport)
- Carbon neutrality
- Carbon offset
- Environmental impact of aviation
- Environmental impact of transport
- Electric aircraft
- Initial IMO Strategy on the reduction of GHG emissions from ships
- Sustainable transport
