= Low-emission zone =

Area established to improve air quality

A low-emission zone (LEZ) is a defined area where access by some polluting vehicles is restricted or deterred with the aim of improving air quality. This may favour vehicles such as bicycles, micromobility vehicles, (certain) alternative fuel vehicles, hybrid electric vehicles, plug-in hybrids, and zero-emission vehicles such as all-electric vehicles.

An ultra-low-emission zone (ULEZ) is a zone with a stricter emissions requirement than LEZ.

A zero-emission zone (ZEZ) is a LEZ where only zero-emissions vehicles (ZEVs) are allowed. In such areas, all internal combustion engine vehicles are banned; this includes any plug-in hybrid vehicles which cannot run zero-emission. Only battery electric vehicles and hydrogen vehicles are allowed in a ZEZ, along with walking and cycling and fully electric public transport vehicles, e.g. trams, electric buses etc.

== Workings ==
In many LEZs, vehicles that do not meet the emission standards set by the LEZ are not barred from entry into the LEZ (i.e. using automated boom barriers), but rather simply fined if they enter the zone. A fine is not issued if entering the LEZ with a vehicle that does not meet the emission standards, when a fee (LEZ daily charge, ...) has been paid. In some LEZs, such as the one in London, this is done by automatic number-plate recognition (ANPR) cameras which read the vehicle registration number plate as they enter the LEZ and then compare it against a database of vehicles which:

- either meet the LEZ emissions standards,
- or are either exempt or registered for a 100 percent discount,
- or if the LEZ daily charge has been paid

This fee/fine works as a deterrent for those having a vehicle that does not meet the LEZ emission standard for entering the city, and those having such vehicles will hence try to avoid paying this fee/fine (using various means, see "intent and actual impact").

== Intent and actual impact ==
The intent of LEZs is generally to improve air quality within cities. This intent is indeed achieved, with diesel particulates (PM10) dropping in most LEZs, and health improving.

Often, this is achieved as people with polluting vehicles replace them with vehicles that attain a higher emission standard, which may mean buying a new vehicle, or travelling throughout avenues and roads distant from the areas where pollution is concentrated. Some people (such as workers on night shift or carrying heavy tools or cargo) however can't do without a car, but might not be able to afford to purchase unsubsidized cleaner vehicles. Therefore in some places the LEZ is only enforced when public transport is available, or electric taxis or cargobikes are subsidized.

The European Federation for Transport and Environment is of the opinion that LEZs should be gradually turned into zero-emission mobility zones and complement policies promoting a switch to clean alternatives, including walking and cycling, among others.

Most LEZs which are not also congestion charge zones do not change the number of vehicles entering the zone: but some LEZs (such as the one in Milan) double as congestion charge zones and thus have the potential to reduce the numbers travelling into the city.

== Implementation by country ==
Sign marking a German low-emission zone. Vehicles with red, yellow, and green emissions stickers are permitted in the zone.

As of 2019 there are about 250 low-emission zones (LEZ), which help meet EU health-based air quality limit values. This means that vehicles may be banned from a LEZ, or in some cases charged if they enter a LEZ when their emissions are over a set level. Although common in Europe the continent's largest cities are lacking: Istanbul has no LEZ and Moscow's is not enforced.

Different vehicles may be regulated, depending on local conditions. All LEZs apply to heavy vehicles, some to diesel vans, others also to diesel and petrol cars; in Italy, motor cycles and three-wheelers are also liable to control.

A publicly funded website run by a network of cities and ministries operating or preparing LEZs gives up-to-date information on LEZs, such as which cities have LEZs, the vehicle types affected, the required emissions standards and their application dates.

=== Belgium ===
Sign indicating the start of a low-emission zone in Belgium
- Antwerp: Since 2017, there has been a LEZ in Antwerp, 24/7. Only diesel vehicles above Euro 3/III norm and petrol vehicles above Euro 1/I norm are allowed to enter the LEZ.
- Brussels: Since 2018, the entire Brussels Capital Region has been a LEZ. Only diesel vehicles above Euro 5/V norm are allowed to enter Brussels.
  Since 2026 petrol or gas-powered vehicles need to be Euro 3/III or more.
- Ghent introduced a LEZ on 1 January 2020.

The low emission zones in Antwerp and Brussels have been shown to have a positive impact on air quality, socio-economic disparities and health.

=== Bulgaria ===
On 1 December 2023, Sofia introduced the first LEZ (Bulgarian: нискоемисионна зона, НЕЗ; niskoemisionna zona, NEZ) in Eastern Europe, banning Euro 1 vehicles from the Bulgarian capital's city centre during the winter. The zone is to be gradually expanded to a wider area and to Euro 2 vehicles by the end of 2027.

=== China ===
A LEZ is present in Beijing.

=== Denmark ===
Denmark has LEZs that are applicable to vehicles over 3.5 t. In Denmark, LEZs exist in Aalborg, Aarhus, Copenhagen, Frederiksberg and Odense.

=== France ===
The low emission zone (zone à faibles émissions; ZFE or zones à circulation restreinte; ZCR) in Paris is operational 8am to 8pm on weekdays, prohibiting certain vehicles from entering during its periods of operation. An air quality (crit'air) sticker is required for all vehicles and must meet the minimum standards. Other French cities with a LEZ in operation include Grenoble, Lyon and Strasbourg

=== Germany ===
In Germany, an LEZ is called an environmental zone (Umweltzone). There are currently 47 LEZs in operation or in planning in Germany. The cities of Berlin, Cologne, Hanover, Mannheim and Stuttgart started LEZs in their respective central city areas in 2008 and more cities followed in the years after.

=== Hong Kong ===
Since the end of 2015, the Hong Kong Government has designated three major junctions in Central, Causeway Bay and Mong Kok as low emission zone for franchised buses. For bus routes entering the three zones, franchised bus operators are required to use only buses meeting emission standards of Euro IV or above except when necessary. The LEZ scheme does not cover vehicles other than franchised buses. As of 31 December 2019, the standard for entry into the LEZ has been increased to Euro V.

=== Indonesia ===
The first LEZ in Indonesia is implemented at the old downtown of Jakarta, the Kota Tua Jakarta. It was first implemented on 8 February 2021 after having a trial run from 18-23 December 2020. The city government chose Kota Tua Jakarta as an LEZ in order to reduce air pollution on the site due to its rich historical value. Air pollution is concerned to damage the structure of old buildings within the site. The LEZ implementation is permanent and only TransJakarta buses, bicycles, pedestrians, and vehicles with special marker are allowed to enter the streets of the old town.

Beside that, LEZ is also implemented at the surrounding area of Tebet Eco Park in South Jakarta. Unlike the previous one in Kota Tua, LEZ in Tebet Eco Park is only implemented on weekends and public holidays. Residents or workers in the surrounding area of the park have to place a sticker with QR code on their vehicle.

=== Italy ===

Italy has LEZs that are applicable to all vehicles. There are combined LEZs and urban road tolling schemes in Milan and Palermo as well as low emission zones with differing standards and time periods. The latter are mainly found in north Italy, but also in mid Italy and Sicily. Some limited traffic zones are also aimed at limiting pollution levels. LEZs are in the legal framework of the Zona a traffico limitato (Limited traffic zone), which is a general prohibition on vehicular traffic in a designated area, with exceptions outlined in the road sign warning the driver of the start of such an area. There is, as of 2026, no differentiation in the signage between an LEZ limited traffic zone and a non-LEZ limited traffic zone and drivers are supposed to deduce from the list of exempted vehicles if they are viable to transit.

=== Japan ===
In Tokyo, the municipal government decided to tackle controlling diesel vehicle emissions (particulate matter emissions, ...) far ahead of the national government.

=== Netherlands ===
Amsterdam, The Hague, Utrecht and Arnhem have LEZs (milieuzone) applying to passenger cars and delivery vans. Only diesel passenger cars and diesel delivery vans meeting the emission standards of Euro 4 and above are allowed to enter the LEZs. Diesel trucks and diesel Buses/coaches have to meet Euro VI (6) or above to enter the LEZs. The LEZ of Arnhem does not apply to buses/coaches.

The LEZ of Amsterdam covers practically the entire area within the A10 highway. The highway itself is not part of the LEZ.

The LEZ of The Hague covers the area enclosed by the Centrumring (S100) and Professor B.M. Teldersweg (S200). These roads themselves, as well as the road from Lijnbaan to the visitors’ car park and the parking garage of the HMC Westeinde hospital, are not part of the LEZ.

Rotterdam has an LEZ applying to trucks only. Diesel trucks have to meet the Euro VI (6) emission standard or above.

=== Norway ===
Norway has LEZs in Bergen and Oslo.

=== Poland ===
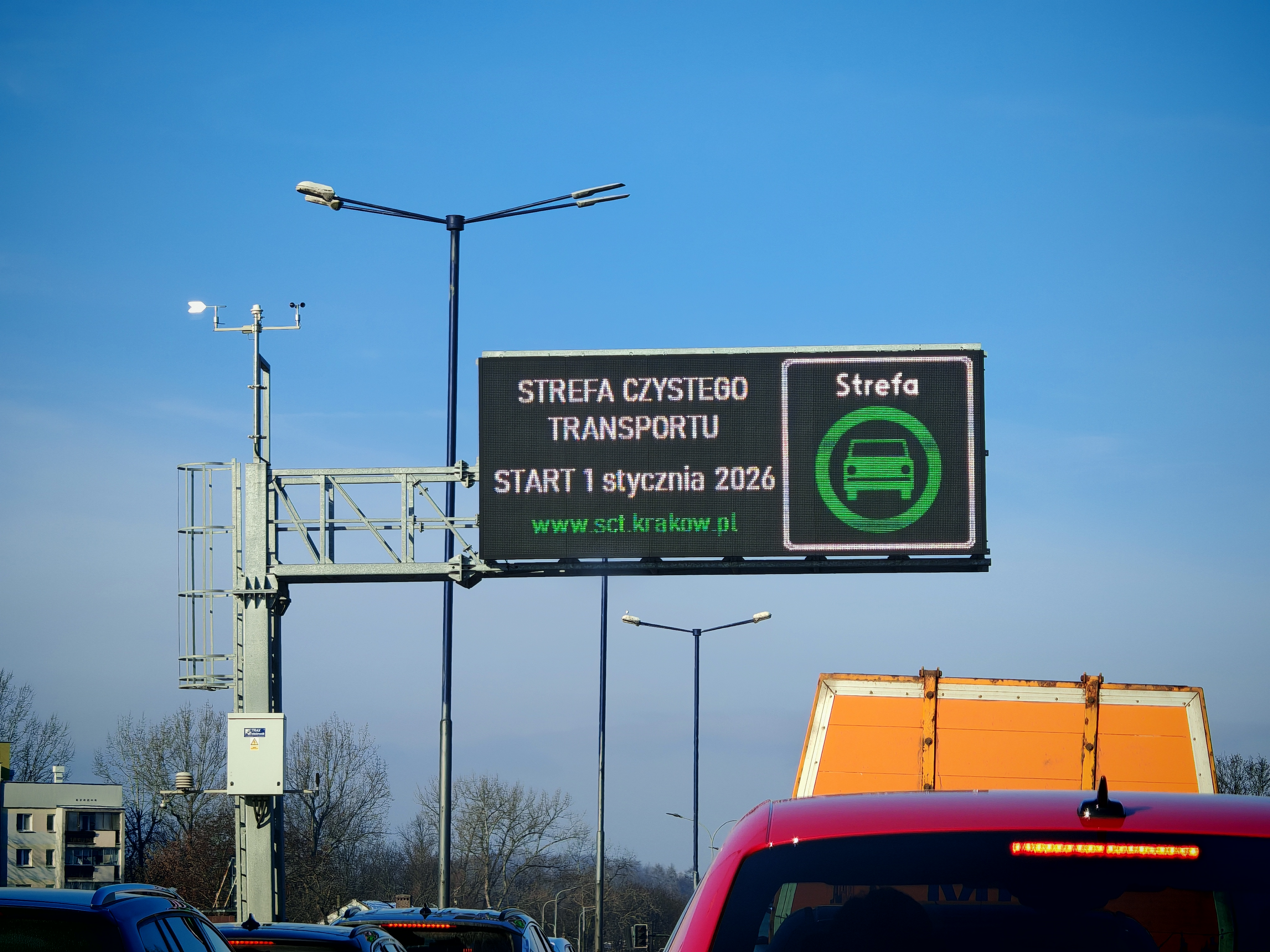
Kraków low emission zone

Poland has LEZ in Warsaw since 2024 and in Kraków since 2026. The introduction of the zone in Kraków was the most often cited grievance by voters who successfully recalled Kraków mayor Aleksander Miszalski from office.

=== Portugal ===
Portugal has an LEZ in Lisbon.

=== Spain ===
Pontevedra was the first Spanish city to ban traffic in its core, in 1999. Málaga and Seville were the next cities to establish low emission zones, with traffic only allowed for residents, in 2009. Seville rolled back its low-emission zone under the mayorship of Juan Ignacio Zoido in 2011, but at date of August 2021 a new system was in the process of implementation.

Madrid established its LEZ in 2018 in its city center, and Barcelona approved it in 2020.

=== Sweden ===
The cities of Gothenburg, Lund, Malmö, Helsingborg, Mölndal, Uppsala, Umeå and Stockholm have low-emission zones. Heavy trucks and buses with compression ignited engines (mainly diesel engines) may not be allowed inside the environmental zones depending on their age and on their emission class.

=== United Kingdom ===
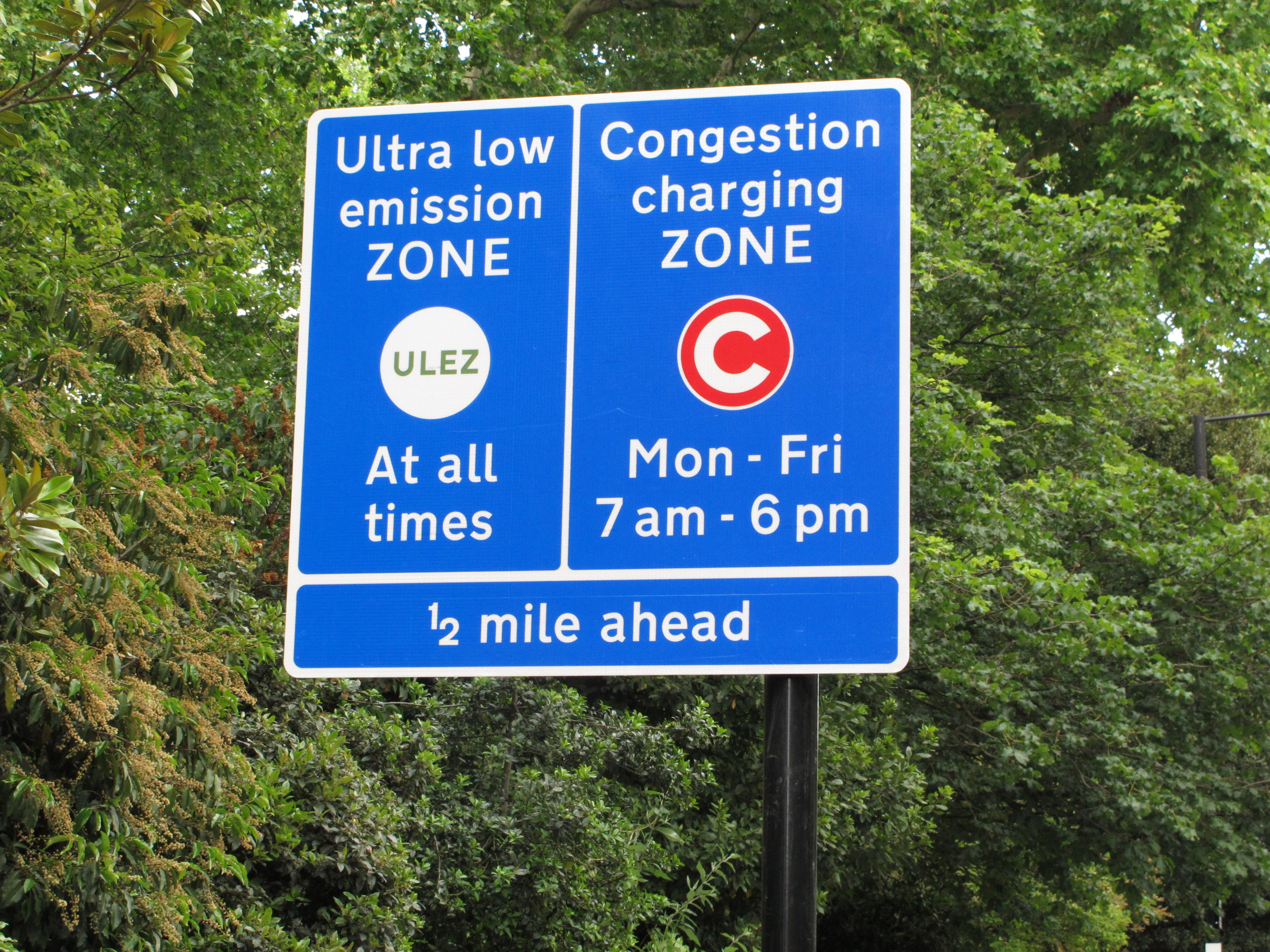
Sign for the Ultra Low Emission Zone (ULEZ) in London (left)

The London low emission zone came into effect in 2008 covering almost all of Greater London – the largest such zone in the world. The low-emission zone targets emissions of these pollutants from older diesel-engined lorries, buses, coaches, vans, minibuses and other heavy vehicles that are derived from lorries and vans such as motor caravans and motorised horse boxes. There was a phased introduction of the scheme from 2008 through to 2012. Different vehicles were affected over time and increasingly tougher emissions standards applied.

The London Ultra Low Emission Zone started on 8 April 2019 and initially covered Central London, the same area as the existing congestion charge. On 25 October 2021, the zone was extended to cover the Inner London area within the North Circular and South Circular roads. It was expanded again on 29 August 2023 to coincide with the London low emission zone, covering almost all of Greater London.

Ultra Low Emission Zone (ULEZ) sign

The Glasgow low emission zone (LEZ) was implemented at the end of 2018. Initially, only local buses in the centre of the city are affected. On 1 June 2023 restrictions were extended to all vehicles, including older petrol and diesel cars. Norwich, and York also introduced a LEZ.

Since 2015, more than 60 local authorities have been ordered to tackle illegal levels of air pollution, which is why many of these planning to introduce clean air zones. The following cities have plans to introduce LEZs: Aberdeen (2020), Bath (2021), Birmingham (2019), Derby, Dundee (2020), Edinburgh (2020), Manchester (2022), Newcastle (2021), and Sheffield (2021). Leeds also intended to introduce a LEZ, however increased uptake of cleaner vehicles led to the scheme's cancellation in 2020.

As of June 2020, Oxford is claiming to become the first city to implement a Zero Emission Zone (ZEZ) scheme, beginning with a small area to go into effect by mid 2021. It was postponed from a 2020 start due to the economic impacts of the COVID-19 pandemic. However, the proposals can more accurately be described as a Low Emission Zone or Ultra Low Emission Zone as any vehicle can enter on payment of a charge. The plan is to expand the ZEZ gradually into a much larger zone, until the ZEZ encompasses the majority of the city centre by 2035.

=== Vietnam ===
LEZ in Vietnam will be planned start on 1 January 2025 according to Capital Law 2024, it will start on Hoan Kiem district and Ba Dinh district, Hanoi.

== See also ==
- Automatic number-plate recognition
- Battery electric vehicle
- Crit'air
- Carfree city
- Congestion pricing
- Cyclability
- Ecopass
- Electric car
- Environmental aspects of the electric car
- Fenceline community
- List of modern production plug-in electric vehicles
- Phase-out of fossil fuel vehicles
- Plug-in electric vehicle
- Plug-in hybrid
- Road space rationing
- Sustainable transport
- Transit mall
- Zero-emissions vehicle
