= Marion Howard Brazier =

American journalist

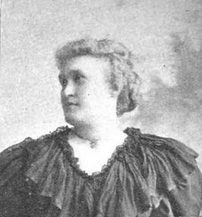
- Marion Howard Brazier (1896)
- Born: September 6, 1850; Charlestown, Massachusetts, U.S.
- Died: January 15, 1935 (aged 84); Westborough, Massachusetts, U.S.
- Education: Bunker Hill School
- Occupations: journalist; editor; author; clubwoman
- Writing career
- Pen name: Marion Howard
- Notable works: Perpetrations, a Book of Humor; Cheer, Philosophy and Comfort

Marion Howard Brazier (pen name, Marion Howard; September 6, 1850 – January 15, 1935) was an American journalist, editor, author, and clubwoman of Boston. She was the author of: Perpetrations, a Book of Humor, and Cheer, Philosophy and Comfort.

Brazier served as society editor of The Boston Post, 1890–98; editor and publisher the Patriotic Review, 1898–1900; and society editor of The Boston Journal, 1903–11. She was a member of sixteen organizations and founder of six, including the Professional Women's Club and the Bunker Hill and Paul Jones Chapters Daughters of the American Revolution (D.A.R.) (also Regent), and Boston Parliamentary Law Clubs. She was also a member of Authors' Society, Drama League, Charity Club, Cremation Society, Boston Common Society, Boston Political Club, and the Woman's Charity Club.

== Early life and education ==
Marion Howard Brazier was born in Charlestown, Massachusetts, September 6, 1850. She was the daughter William Henry and Sarah Jane (Sargent) Brazier. William Henry Brazier was a veteran of the Civil War and member of the Grand Army of the Republic. According to family tradition Mr. Brazier was descended from Sir Henry Brazier, who lived many years ago in Lincolnshire, England. The maiden name of Miss Brazier's mother was Sarah Jane Sargent. She was daughter of David Sargent (the fourth of that name in direct line) and his wife, Elizabeth I. Fille-brown, and was a descendant in the ninth generation of William Sargent, of Malden, Massachusetts, who came from Northampton, England, in 1638. William is said to have been son of Roger and grandson of Hugh Sargent, of Northamptonshire, England. Two of Brazier's ancestors on the maternal side —namely, David Sargent and Abraham Rand— were soldiers of the American Revolution, the last named serving three years in the army. His mother, Anne Devens, wife of Thomas Rand, was "probably daughter of Philip Devens" and nearly related to the family to which Judge Devens belonged.

She was graduated from the Bunker Hill School at the close of the Civil War.

Another patriotic ancestor, John Hicks II, of Cambridge, Massachusetts was slain by the British in the retreat from Lexington, Massachusetts, April 19, 1775. Charles H. Saunders, former mayor of Cambridge, first president of the Sons of the American Revolution, was also a descendant of John Hicks and second cousin to Brazier.

== Career ==
=== Writer ===
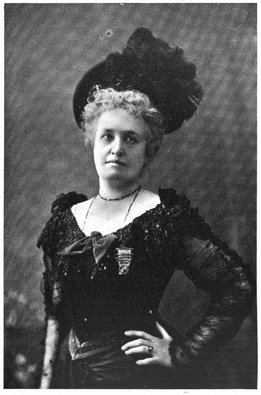
Marion Howard Brazier (1902)

After Brazier had worked for a number of years as an accountant and cashier, her health became impaired and required a change of location and occupation. After relocating to Santa Fe, New Mexico, she had a sudden inspiration in 1888 to write about the scenes in that city. Thus it happened that, in the room where General Lew Wallace had written Ben-Hur, Brazier wrote her first article for publication.

Until 1889, her health was delicate. In California, she supplied the local and New England papers with specials on many topics. While traveling, she acted as special correspondent for papers in nearly every part of the country. This business she systematized, and made into a syndicate in the years when syndicates were very popular, and made a significant amount of money from her venture. At that time, she was supplying as many as 60-80 newspapers a week with a letter.

Brazier conducted a clipping bureau with a specialty in personal clippings about persons prominent in society. The bureau also provided notes and reports relating to women's clubs and patriotic societies. She was for a long time society and club editor of the Boston Sunday Post, regular contributor to the Boston Evening Transcript, editor of a New York City society magazine, and space writer for innumerable newspapers. In addition to being a journalist, she was a biographer.

Her writing was largely devoted to patriotic matters. The Patriotic Review, an example of historical literature, was founded by Brazier in 1898. She was its editor and publisher, and it had a good circulation before it collapsed in 1904. In that same year, she served as the society editor of the Boston Journal, and was a regular contributor to the Sunday Herald and the Globe.

=== Activist ===
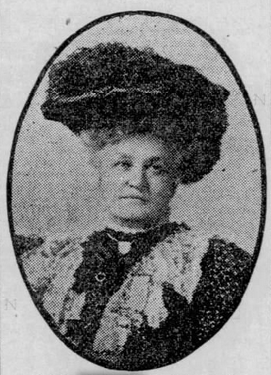
Marion Howard Brazier (1906)

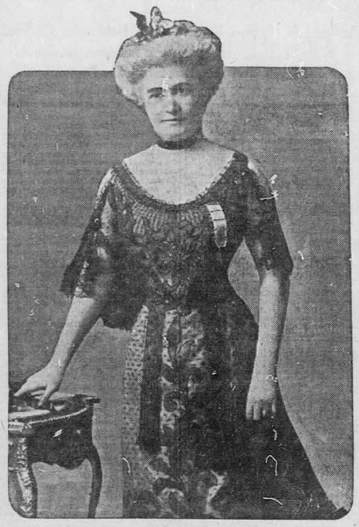
Marion Howard Brazier (1909)

Brazier held membership in the following organizations: New England Woman's Press Association; Charity Club; Actors' Church Alliance; Daughters of Veterans; USWV Auxiliary; Daughters of New Hampshire and of Massachusetts; Woman's Club House Corporation; and in the DAR National Society, in which she founded two chapters — Bunker Hill and Paul Jones. She was also the founder of the Parliamentary Law Club. Through her efforts, the naval hero of the American Revolution was honored in Massachusetts, and a schoolhouse bears his name in East Boston.

While in Paris in 1888, she became interested in everything touching upon the connection between France and the American colonies during the revolution. She initiated inquiries to locate the resting place of John Paul Jones and subsequently advocated strongly for the United States to employ all available resources to find his lost grave and relocate his remains to a site in the U.S. Brazier established the Paul Jones Chapter, DAR, on June 14, 1898. Through her dedicated efforts and collaboration with various patriotic societies, a public school in Boston was named Paul Jones School. Additionally, the chapter installed a bronze tablet, which stands as the sole memorial to the founder of the American navy. She arranged the dedicatory exercises, which occurred April 15, 1904. The Massachusetts Naval Brigade acted as escort to Gov. Curtis Guild Jr., who made the address and presented the tablet to the city.

The Bunker Hill Cbapter, DAR. was organized on historic ground in Charlestown, June 17, 1896, with 38 charter members. Its founder and first Regent was Brazier, a descendant of John Hicks, the first soldier to be killed at the Concord Bridge. Through the efforts of Brazier, it contributed many framed lithographs representing the American flag with dates showing the time of admission of states to the Boston public schools.

== Personal life and death ==
Brazier had been living at Trinity Court in Boston before moving to Westboro, Massachusetts, where she lived for a year before her death, January 15, 1935. A brother, Frederick W. Brazier of Forest Hills, Long Island, New York, survived her.

== Selected works ==
- Fred's hard fight, 1873
- Stage and screen., 1920
- Perpetrations wise and otherwise, 1925
- The Professional Women's Club, 1907-1927, 1927
- John Paul Jones, founder of the American Navy., 1929
