= Bunker (surname) =

Bunker is a surname.

== People ==
Notable people with the surname include:

- Berkeley L. Bunker (1906–99), American politician
- Chang and Eng Bunker (1811–74), Thai-American conjoined twin brothers
- Christopher Bunker (born 1956), British dermatologist
- Clive Bunker (born 1946), drummer
- Dennis Miller Bunker (1861–90), American painter
- Earle Bunker (1912–75), American photographer, one of the two winners of the 1944 Pulitzer Prize
- Eber Bunker (1761–1836), American sea captain and pastoralist
- Edward Bunker (Mormon) (1822–1901), American Mormon pioneer
- Edward Bunker (1933–2005), American writer
- Ellsworth Bunker (1894–1984), American diplomat
- Howard G. Bunker (1905–94), USAF General
- Larry Bunker (1928–2005), American jazz drummer, vibraphonist, and percussionist
- Mark Bunker, American broadcast journalist, videographer and documentary filmmaker
- Max Bunker (born 1939), Italian comic book artist
- Michael Bunker (born 1937), Anglican clergyman
- Nathaniel M. Bunker (1817–89), American politician
- Paul Bunker (1881–1943), American football player and soldier
- Philip Bunker, British-Canadian scientist
- Rob Bunker (born 1988), American race car driver
- Robert J. Bunker, American academic
- Stephan Bunker, American politician
- Wally Bunker (born 1945), former Major League Baseball pitcher

== Fictional characters ==
- Bunker (character), character in Teen Titans, a super-hero
- Archie Bunker, Carroll O'Connor's character on All in the Family
- Edith Bunker, Jean Stapleton's character on All in the Family
- Gloria Stivic (née Bunker), from All in the Family
