= Bunker Hill Military Academy =

Coordinates: 39°2′47.7″N 89°56′38.7″W

- Bunker Hill, Illinois; United States

Information
- Established: 1859
- Founder: Samuel L. Stiver
- Closed: 1914

Bunker Hill Military Academy was a military school located in the town of Bunker Hill, Illinois.

== History ==
The school opened in 1859 as the Bunker Hill Academy (and was at the time non-military) but closed during the American Civil War. From 1862 until 1869, the building housed Bunker Hill's public school. In 1883, the military academy was established in the ageing building by Congregational clergyman Reverend Samuel L. Stiver, offering strict instruction to local children as well as the cadets. Reverend Stiver remained head of BHMA for the next 27 years. Between 1883 and 1910, a total of 1,050 cadets were enrolled. During the Academy's years of operation, it received high praise from many people. Former students, parents, church ministers, editors, businessmen, and former officials of BHMA are among those from whom the Academy received such high acclaim.

With Stiver's death in November 1910, no successor was able to operate the Academy as well as Stiver had, causing it to close at the end of the 1914 school year. It was sold at auction to James Jencks. A large bell used by BHMA was installed in the belfry of the Berean Baptist Church two years later.

== BHMA Regulations ==
A lengthy and stern code of regulations governed life at Bunker Hill Military Academy. Concerning the rules that cadets followed, Carolyn Scroggins, author of the essay "Bunker Hill Military Academy", wrote:

"The list of important regulations for the cadets to live by was long and very rigid. Some of these in summary were; games of chance or betting were not allowed; cadets were to remain within Academy limits unless granted permission to leave; forbidden to have firearms, except by consent of the Superintendent; all cadets were to abstain from all forms of immoral conduct; use of alcoholic drinks, tobacco and narcotics strictly forbidden, (There were no saloons in Bunker Hill); profane, obscene coarse or violent language forbidden; all cadets shall show courtesy and respect to all; promptly obey orders; no cadet shall strike disturb or annoy in his room and there were more. The last paragraph of the regulations reads; All innocent and invigorating amusements and sports are encouraged and provided for. All self-respecting boys are happy and at home at the Academy."

== Tuition & Fees ==
The annual cost of board and tuition was $350 in 1908 ($10,075.81 in 2021) and $450 in 1910 ($12,954.61 in 2021). A sum of 25 cents per week ($7.20 in 2021) was suggested by the Academy as spending money for cadets.

== Uniforms ==
From "Bunker Hill Military Academy" by Carolyn Scroggins:

"Two military suits, of West Point Cut and a cap cost $30.00 ($863.64 in 2021). Cadets were measured and suits were made by the school tailor. In addition, one suit for common wear, rubber shoes, umbrella, bed linens, blankets, toilet articles and underclothes were expected. Also, they were to furnish six napkins and a napkin ring."

== Athletics ==
BHMA featured baseball, football, and track teams. BHMA sports teams are mentioned in Carolyn Scroggins' book as having frequently beaten Bunker Hill High School in games.

== Passing of Reverend Stiver and the closing of BHMA ==
From "Bunker Hill Military Academy" by Carolyn Scroggins, concerning BHMA's ultimate fate:

"Superintendent Stiver died in November, 1910. Succeeding leaders were unsuccessful in the operation of the school and it was closed after the 1914 year. It was later sold at auction to James Jencks (father of Dorothy Jencks Stevenson). The large bell was purchased and installed in the belfry of the Berean Baptist Church in 1916. I’ve read that some of the bricks were used in the building now used by Farmers Supply. I don’t know if there are other items from the Academy still in existence. Some say that the concrete platform in the center of the park was part of the old Bunker Hill Military Academy building. Eventually, the Academy grounds were sold to the Ladies Civic League where they maintained a park until after the 1948 tornado. The American Legion then took it over and has continued to maintain a park on the grounds."

== Notable visitors to BHMA ==
- The Honorable Edward Wilson, Gazette-News Editor and graduate of Michigan University.
- The Honorable A. S. Cuthbertson, States Attorney for Macoupin County.
