= Bunker Hill, Washington =

Unincorporated community in Washington, United States

- Unincorporated community
- Location in the state of Washington Bunker Hill (the United States)
- Coordinates: 46°12′08″N 123°08′19″W
- Country: United States
- State: Washington
- County: Cowlitz
- Elevation: 476 ft (145 m)
- Time zone: UTC−8 (PST)
  - Summer (DST): UTC−7 (PDT)
- ZIP Code: 98632
- Area code(s): 360, 564
- FIPS code: 53-08760
- GNIS feature ID: 1510848

Bunker Hill is an unincorporated community in Cowlitz County, Washington, United States. Bunker Hill is located northwest of the city of Longview, reached by traveling westbound out of the city along Washington State Route 4, also known as Ocean Beach Highway, and turning north onto Bunker Hill Road. The Bunker Hill community is part of the Longview School District, a K-12 school district of about 6,600 students.
