= Directive 2008/50/EC =

EU air-quality directive setting pollution limits

Directive 2008/50/EC, or the Ambient Air Quality Directive, is an EU directive which limits sulphur dioxide, NO_{2} and other oxides of nitrogen, particulate matter (PM10, PM2.5), lead, benzene and carbon monoxide concentrations from 2010. Hourly average concentrations of NO_{2} are limited to 200 μg/m^{3} and yearly average concentrations to 40 μg/m^{3}. As of 2018 several EU member states are being sued for violating the limits: France, Spain, Italy, Hungary, Romania, Slovakia, the Czech Republic, the United Kingdom and Germany.

Directives 96/62/EC, 1999/30/EC, 2000/69/EC and 2002/3/EC were repealed by this directive, with effect from 11 June 2010.

On 15 February 2018, five member countries were urged to safeguard public health.

On 22 February 2018, Poland was found guilty of violating the emission limits in the Radom, Pruszków-Żyrardów and Kędzierzyn-Koźle and Ostrów-Kępno districts during the eight-year period from 2007 to 2015.

== See also ==
- TA Luft, a set of laws which implement the directive in Germany
- NO_{x}_{,} a generic term for the nitrogen oxides which are most relevant for air pollution
