= Bunker Hill, Fayette County, Indiana =

Bunker Hill, Indiana
- Unincorporated community
- Location within Indiana Location within the United States
- Coordinates: 39°38′00″N 85°12′45″W
- Country: United States
- State: Indiana
- County: Fayette
- Township: Connersville
- Elevation: 942 ft (287 m)
- ZIP code: 47331
- FIPS code: 18-09100
- GNIS feature ID: 431809

Bunker Hill is an unincorporated community in Connersville Township, Fayette County, Indiana.
