= Bunker Hill, Lewis County, Missouri =

Extinct hamlet in Missouri, U.S.

Coordinates: 40.1800435°N 91.7387755°W

Bunker Hill is a former town in Lewis County, in the U.S. state of Missouri.

Bunker Hill was laid out in 1855. The community's name commemorated the Battle of Bunker Hill. A post office was established at Bunker Hill in 1855, and remained in operation until 1904.
