= Bunker Hill (Millersville, Maryland) =

Historic house in Maryland, United States

- U.S. National Register of Historic Places
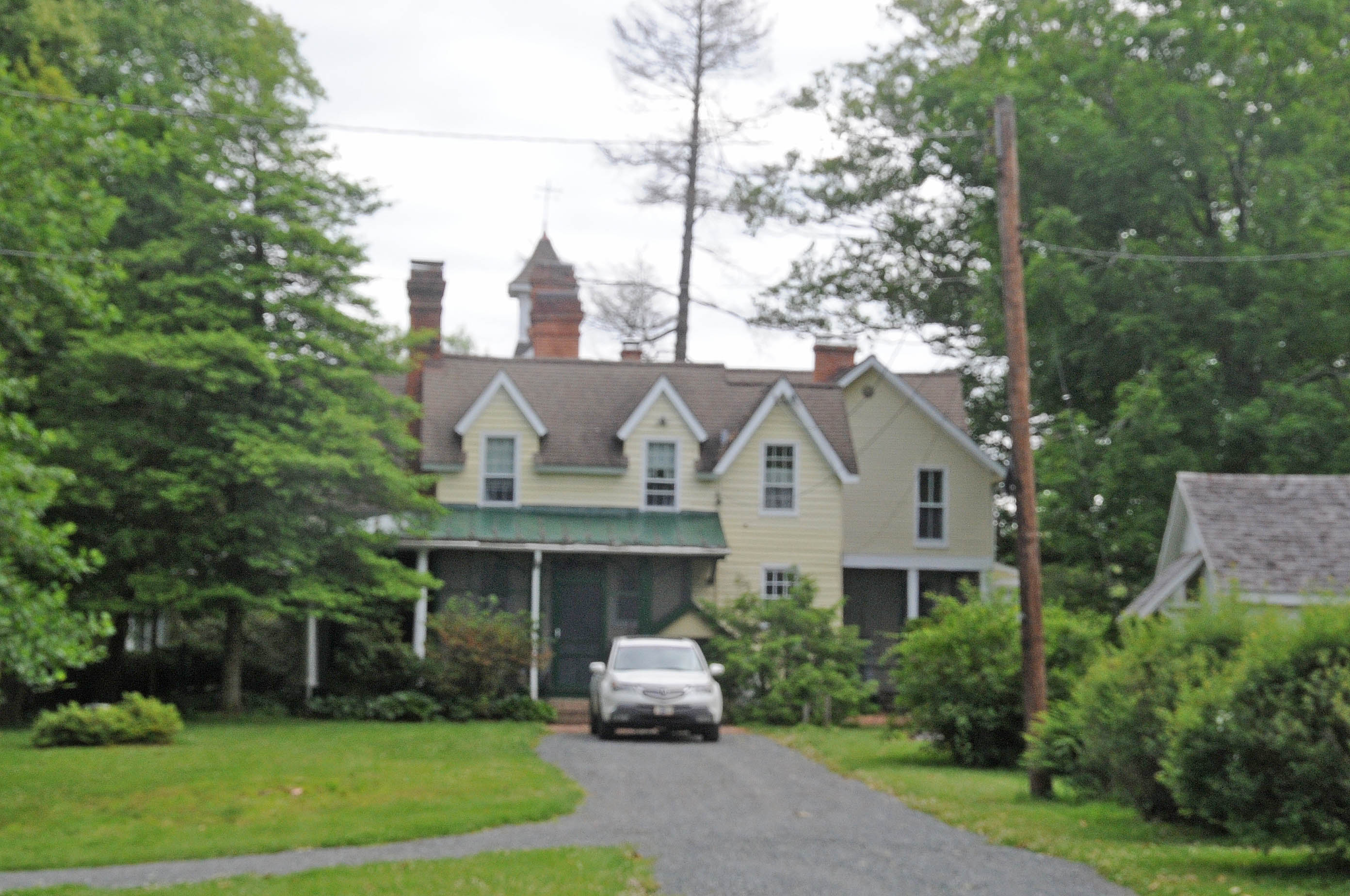

- Location within Maryland Location within the United States
- Location: Maryland Route 178 and Millersville Rd., Millersville, Maryland
- Coordinates: 39°3′24″N 76°37′42″W
- Area: 38.5 acres (15.6 ha)
- Built: 1820
- Architectural style: Late Victorian, Victorian Picturesque
- NRHP reference No.: 84000034
- Added to NRHP: October 11, 1984

Bunker Hill is a historic home at Millersville, Anne Arundel County, Maryland, United States. It is a large, eclectic, frame dwelling which reflects several periods of growth. The final composition embodies the late-19th century Victorian Picturesque, A.J. Downing "cottage" style of architecture. The main block, which contains the principal entrance, was constructed about 1820 and a large two story wing was added to the rear about 1870. Later additions occurred throughout the 20th Century. Several 19th-century frame outbuildings and a caretaker's house are on the site, including a smokehouse/dairy, root cellar, tool house, chicken house, slave quarters, carriage house, ice house, pumphouse, barn, and corncrib.

Bunker Hill was listed on the National Register of Historic Places in 1984.
