= Crit'air =

French air quality certificate

Crit'air vignettes

The French Crit'Air air quality certificate (French: Certificat qualité de l'air) is a vignette (a secure sticker) issued to show a vehicle's compliance with European emission standards.

Crit'Air covers all road vehicles, including motorcycles, quad bikes, private cars, vans, trucks, coaches and buses.

Under the Law on Energy Transition for Green Growth, local councils are allowed to provide benefits only to less polluting vehicles, and vignettes enable them to be identified. The system also allows urban areas to restrict the use of the more polluting vehicles, either at all times, or when pollution levels are high.

Crit'Air was developed by the French Ministry of the Environment in collaboration with the French Ministry of the Interior to reduce the environmental impact of road transport.

Drivers are required to place the vignette on the inside of the lower-right hand corner of their windscreen; different colour vignettes indicate different emissions classes.

The vignettes can be ordered online for payment of a small fee, currently €3.67 including postage, after submission of a copy of the vehicle registration certificate for verification of the emissions class. Many online third party sellers also provide a different interface to order Crit'Air vignettes for a higher price, typically €20-30.

== Categories ==
There are six different coloured vignettes, relating to six categories. The category into which a vehicle falls depends on the engine type (electric, hydrogen, petrol or diesel) and the European emission standard (Euro standard). Where the emission standard is not recorded, the date of first registration is used instead to determine a category. The categories are not based on actual technical measurement of the vehicle in question.

Air quality certificates according to the year of registration or the Euro standard for some motor vehicles
Colour	Category	Electric or hydrogen vehicle	Rechargeable gas or hybrid vehicle	Petrol private car or light commercial vehicle (LCV)		Diesel private car or light commercial vehicle (LCV)	
Colour	Category	Electric or hydrogen vehicle	Rechargeable gas or hybrid vehicle	Euro standard	Date of registration	Euro standard	Date of registration
Green		All					
Violet	1		All	Euro 5 and 6	1 Jan 2011 –		
Yellow	2			Euro 4	1 Jan 2006 – 31 Dec 2010	Euro 5 and 6	1 Jan 2011 –
Orange	3			Euro 2 and 3	1 Jan 1997 (LCV: 1 Oct 1997) – 31 Dec 2005	Euro 4	1 Jan 2006 – 31 Dec 2010
Red	4					Euro 3	1 Jan 2001 – 31 Dec 2005
Grey	5					Euro 2	1 Jan 1997 (LCV: 1 Oct 1997) – 31 Dec 2000

== Environmental zones ==
France has two types of zone that have emissions-related traffic restrictions. Both are enforced by the use of the Crit'Air vignettes.

=== ZFE ===
In a zone à faibles émissions (ZFE) there is a permanent requirement for vehicles to display Crit'Air vignettes, and certain classes of vehicle are always prohibited from driving within the zone.

=== ZPA ===
In a zone de protection de l'air (ZPA), which tends to be significantly larger than the ZCR zones, traffic is only restricted by public announcement at times of high air pollution; and all vehicles must display a vignette at those times.

If a ZPA applies to an entire département then it is termed a ZPAd (zone de protection de l'air départementale).

== See also ==
- Low-emission zone
