= Bunker Hill, Tennessee =

Unincorporated community in Tennessee, US

Coordinates: 35.7301°N 87.9970°W

Bunker Hill is a location in Perry County, Tennessee.

It stands at an elevation of 630 feet (190 m).

== Notable people ==
- Bennie Brownlow, early baseball player and coach, born in Bunker Hill in 1886.
- Elam Stevenson, early 19th century Methodist preacher, lived here.
