= Bunker Hill School =

- U.S. National Register of Historic Places
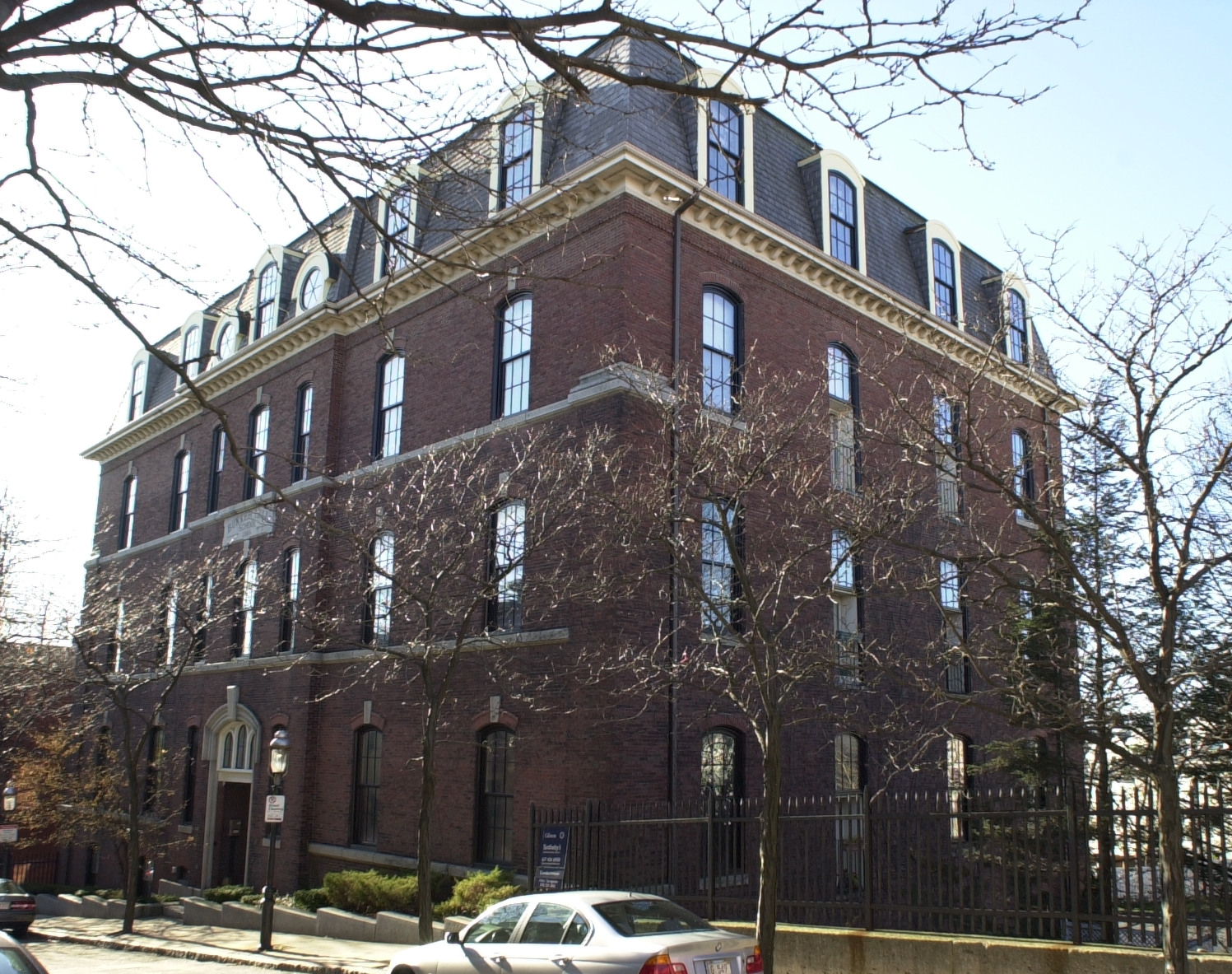

- Location within Boston Location within Massachusetts Location within the United States
- Location: 68 Baldwin St., Boston, Massachusetts
- Coordinates: 42°22′56.4″N 71°4′13.4″W
- Area: less than one acre
- Built: 1866
- Architect: James H. Rand
- Architectural style: Second Empire, Mansard
- NRHP reference No.: 87001771
- Added to NRHP: October 15, 1987

The Bunker Hill School is a historic school at 68 Baldwin Street in the Charlestown neighborhood of Boston, Massachusetts. Built in 1866, it is a prominent local example of Second Empire architecture, and a surviving example of the city's school planning in the post-Civil War period. Now housing residential condominiums, it was listed on the National Register of Historic Places in 1987.

== Description and history ==
The former Bunker Hill School is located in the densely built Charlestown neighborhood of Boston, on the west side of Baldwin Street at its junction with Bunker Hill Street. It is a 3 1/2-story brick building, with a mansard roof providing space for a full fourth story. Its main facade is seven bays wide, with the center three projecting slightly. Windows are set in segmented arch openings with headers of brick with stone keystones, and there are stone stringcourses between the floors. The main entrance is recessed in the center bay, in a segmented-arch opening framed by shouldered stone surround with keystone. The interior, now converted into residences, historically was divided into four spaces on each floor, organized around a central stair. On the lower three floors, three of these spaces were occupied by classrooms, while the fourth house administrative and other non-classroom spaces. There were two classrooms on the top floor, with the other half taken up by an auditorium space.

The school was built in 1866, when the city of Charlestown (then separate from Boston) was growing, and there was more widespread interest in quality education. Designed by James H. Rand, a local architect, it exemplified new thinking about school facilities, including improved lighting and ventilation for classrooms, and the use of fireproof materials in its construction. The school served Charlestown (and Boston after it was annexed to that city) until 1981, when it was closed due to declining enrollment. It was sold to a private developer in 1984 and converted into residential condominiums.

== Notable people ==
- Marion Howard Brazier (1850-1935), journalist, editor, author, clubwoman

== Gallery ==
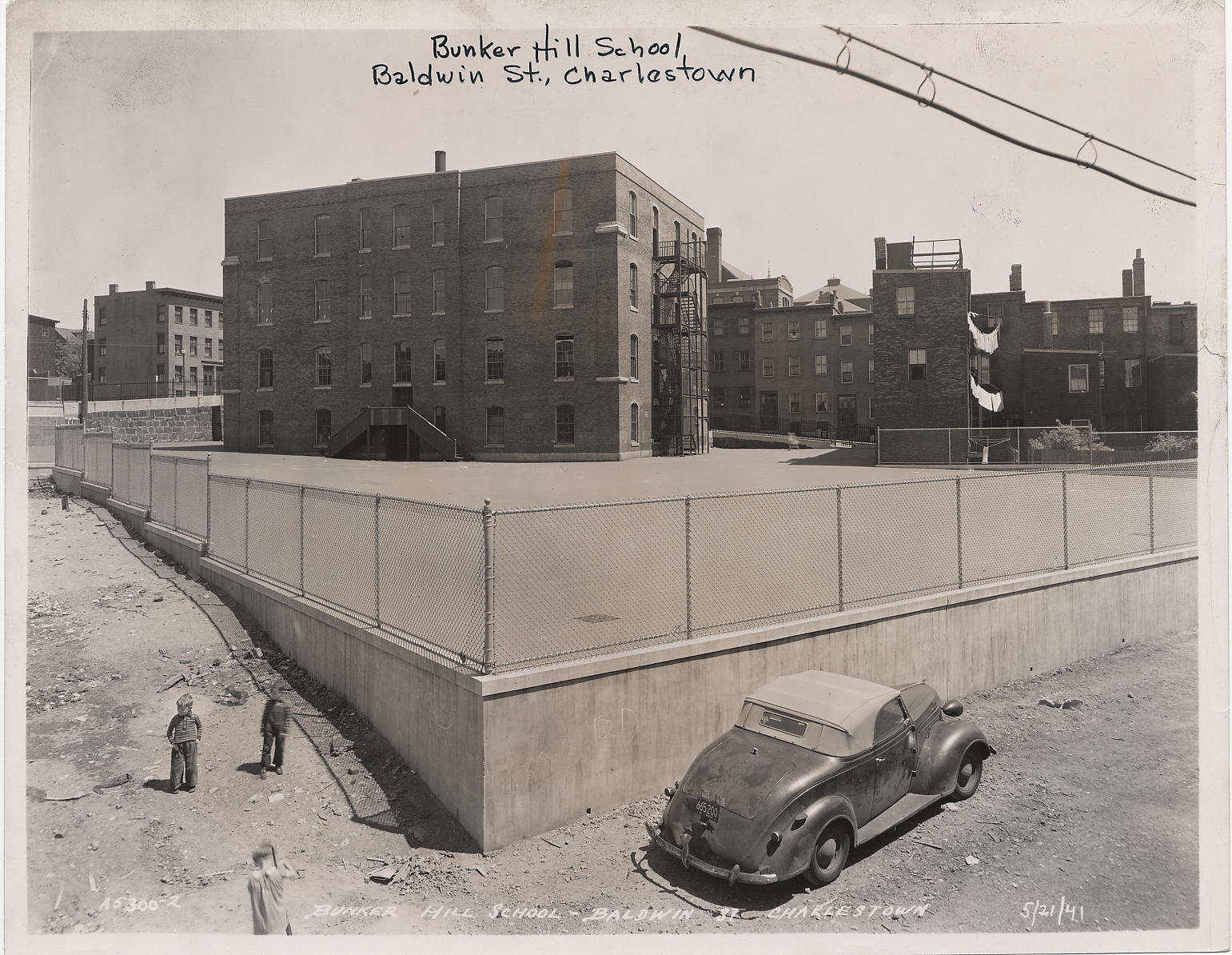
Bunker Hill School in 1941

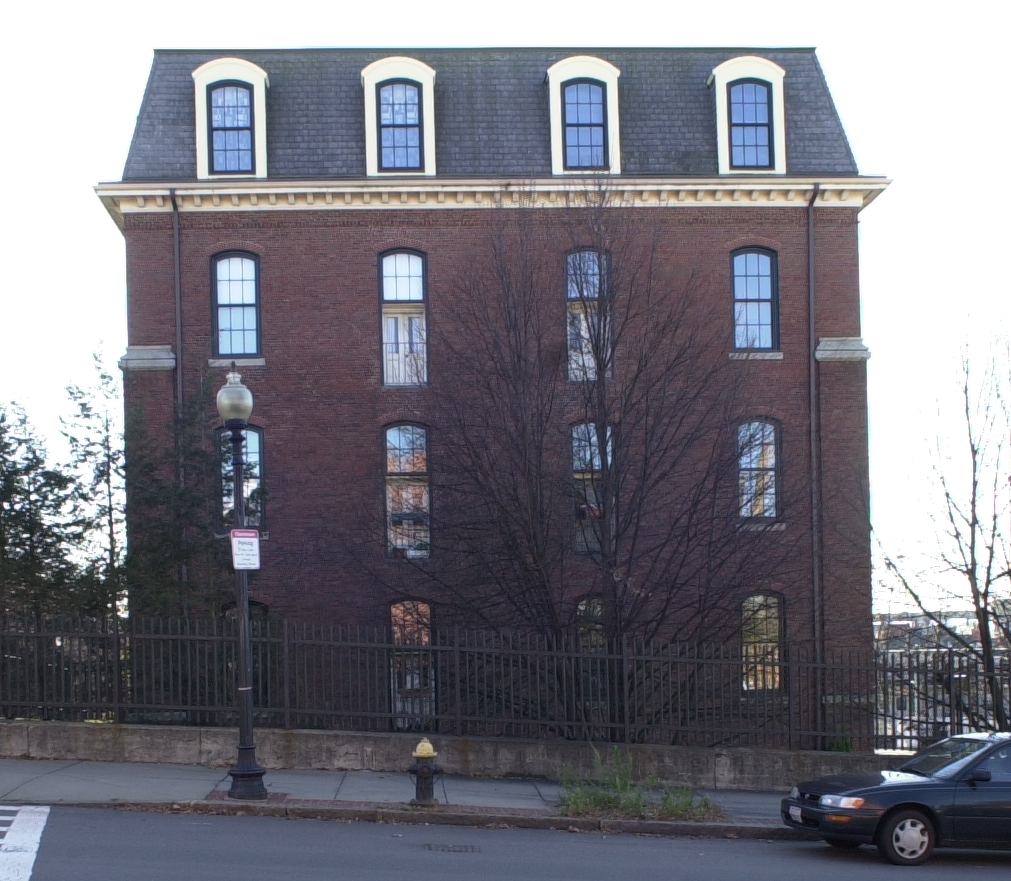

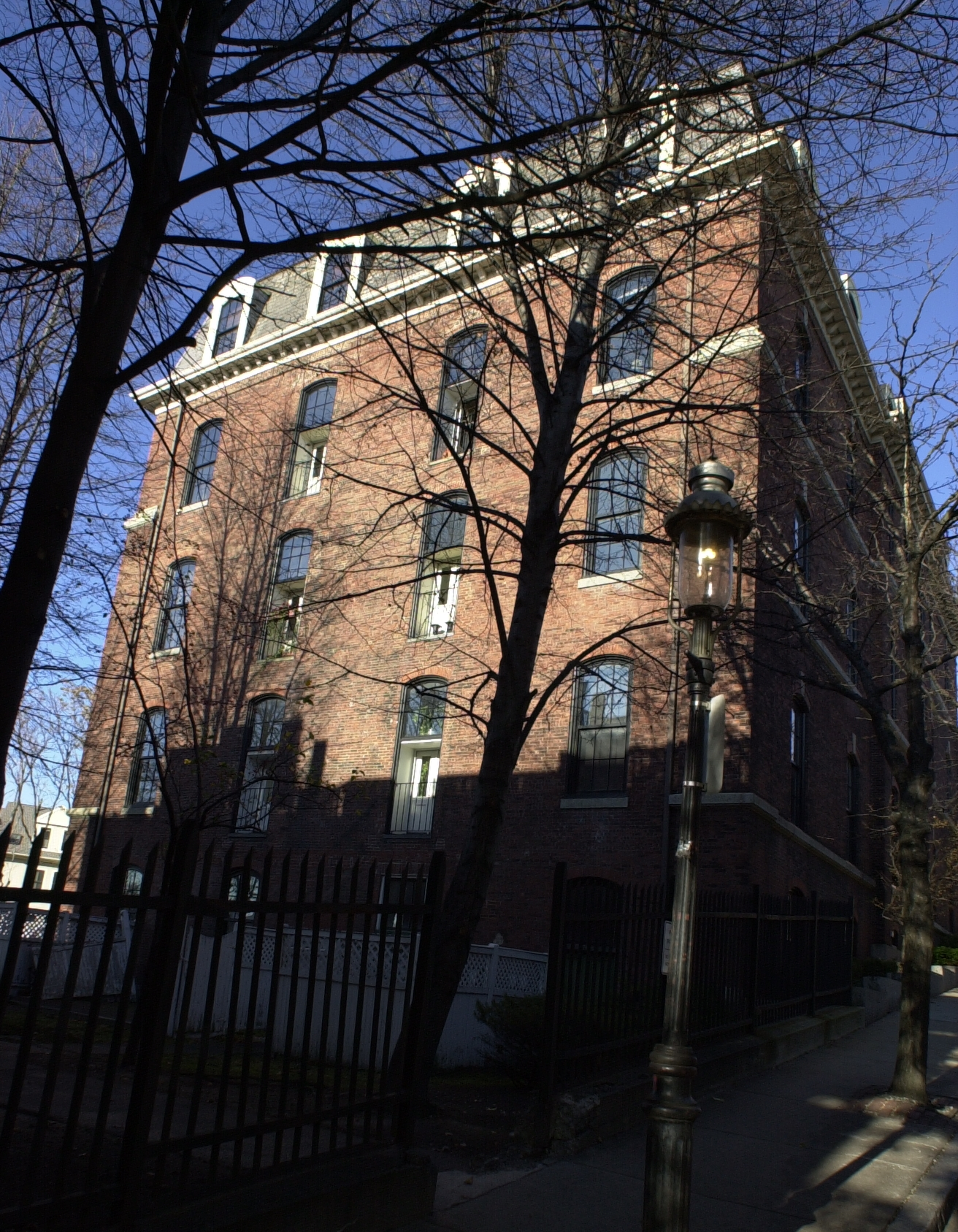

== See also ==
- National Register of Historic Places listings in northern Boston, Massachusetts
