= Bunkers (energy in transport) =

In energy statistics, marine bunkers and aviation bunkers as defined by the International Energy Agency are the energy consumption of ships and aircraft.

Marine and aviation bunkers are reported separately from international bunkers, which represent consumption of ships and aircraft on international routes.

International bunkers are subtracted from the energy supplies of a country to calculate its domestic consumption. It is as if international aviation and international shipping did not belong to any country. They are managed by the International Civil Aviation Organization (ICAO) and the International Maritime Organization (IMO).

== Critics ==
The European Federation for Transport and Environment has only limited confidence in ICAO and IMO's ability to reduce air and sea emissions due to international bunkers and thus to comply with the Paris Climate Agreement.

== A few figures ==
International marine bunkers amount to 2,466 TWh/a whereas international aviation bunkers amount to 2,163 TWh/a.

== See also ==
- Bunkering
