= Toll roads in Great Britain =

Toll roads in Great Britain, used to raise fees for the management of roads in the United Kingdom, were common in the era of the turnpike trusts. Currently there is a single major road, the M6 Toll and a small number of bridges and tunnels where tolls are collected. In addition, there are also three UK road pricing schemes, the London congestion charge, the Durham congestion charge and the Oxford congestion charge.

== History ==
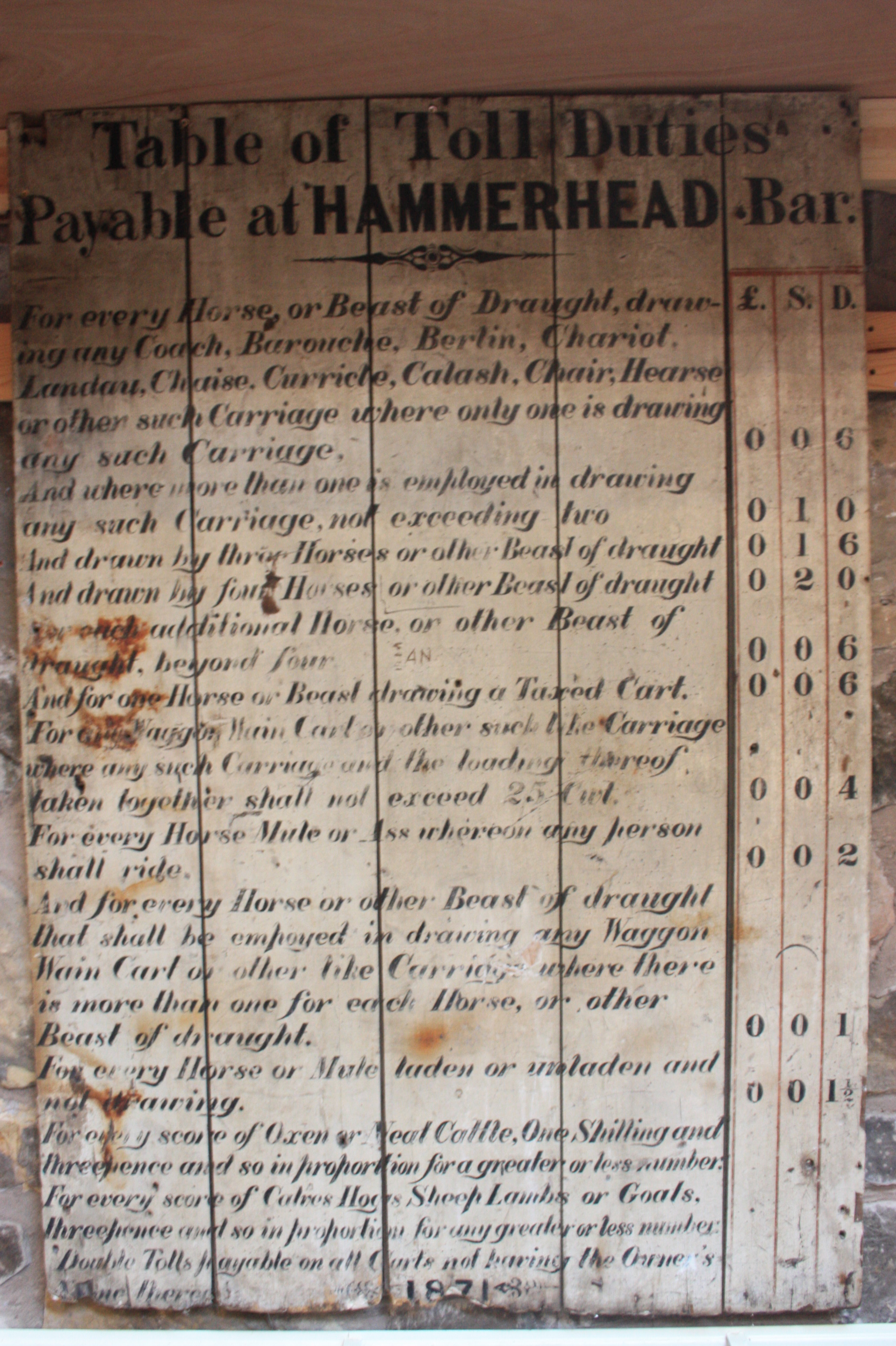
Original board of Toll Road charges, from Hammerhead Toll, Fife, east of Auchtermuchty (1871) Fife Folk Museum

=== Medieval period ===
In the 14th century, pavage grants, which had previously been made for paving the market place or streets of towns, began also to be used for maintaining some roads between towns. These grants were made by letters patent, almost invariably for a limited term, presumably the time likely to be required to pay for the required works.

Responsibility for the upkeep of most roads seems to have rested with landowners, however. This was probably not easily enforced against them. The Parliament of England placed the upkeep of bridges to local settlements or the containing county under the Bridges Act 1530 and in 1555 the care of roads was similarly devolved to the parishes as statute labour under the Highways Act 1555. Every adult inhabitant of the parish was obliged to work four consecutive days a year on the roads, providing their own tools, carts and horses. The work was overseen by an unpaid local appointee, the Surveyor of Highways.

It was not until 1654 that road rates were introduced. However, the improvements offered by paid labour were offset by the rise in the use of wheeled vehicles greatly increasing wear to the road surfaces. The government reaction to this was to use legislation to limit the use of wheeled vehicles and also to regulate their construction. A vain hope that wider rims would be less damaging briefly led to carts with sixteen inch wheels. They did not cause ruts but neither did they roll and flatten the road as was hoped.

=== Turnpikes ===
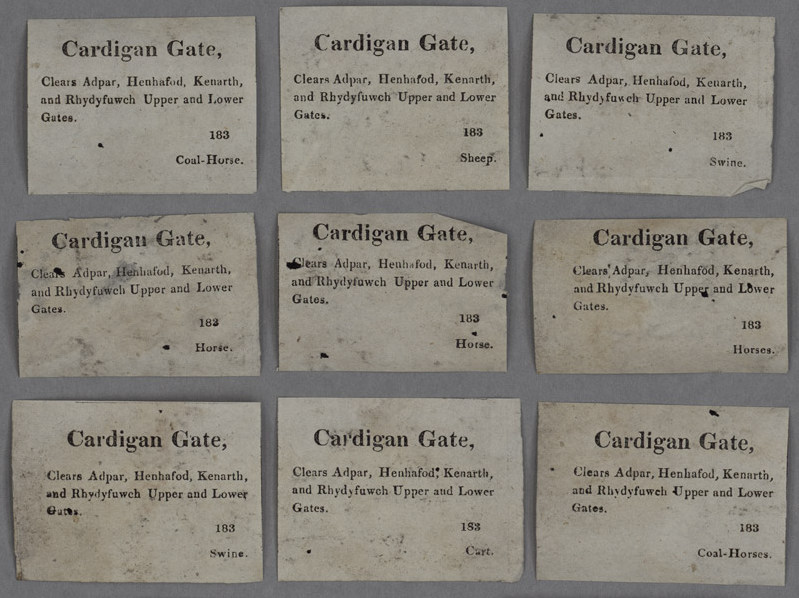
Toll Gate tickets, c.1830

The first turnpike road, whereby travellers paid tolls to be used for road upkeep, was authorised by the Road Repair (Hertfordshire, Cambridgeshire, and Huntingdonshire) Act 1663 (15 Cha. 2. c. 1) for a section of the Great North Road in Hertfordshire, Bedfordshire and Huntingdonshire. The term turnpike refers to the military practice of placing a pikestaff across a road to block and control passage. Upon payment of the toll, the pike would be "turned" to one side to allow travellers through. Most English gates were not built to this standard; of the first three gates, two were found to be easily avoided.

The early turnpikes were administered directly by the justices of the peace in quarter sessions. The first trusts were established by Parliament through the Bedfordshire and Buckinghamshire Roads Act 1706 (6 Ann. c. 4), placing a section of the London-Coventry-Chester road in the hands of a group of trustees.

The trustees could erect gates as they saw fit, demand statute labour or a cash equivalent, and appoint surveyors and collectors, in return they repaired the road and put up mileposts. Initially trusts were established for limited periods – often twenty one years. The expectation was that the trust would borrow the money to repair the road and repay that debt over time with the road then reverting to the parishes. In reality the initial debt was rarely paid off and the trusts were renewed as needed.

Shortly after the creation of Great Britain in 1707, turnpike acts began to be passed by Parliament to encourage the construction of toll roads in Scotland in the same way they had been used successfully in England and Wales. The first turnpike act for a road scheme in Scotland was the Edinburgh Bridges and Highways Act 1713 (13 Ann. c. 30) for the construction of a road in Midlothian.

Although in the south of England common carriers' carts became frequent, they were not seen for a long time north of York or west of Exeter. Long trains of packhorses still carried goods through Settle until the Keighley and Kendal Turnpike was started in 1753.

==== The decline of turnpikes ====
The rise of railway transport largely halted the improving schemes of the turnpike trusts. The London-Birmingham railway almost instantly halved the tolls income of the Holyhead Road. The system was never properly reformed but from the 1870s Parliament stopped renewing the acts and roads began to revert to local authorities, the last trust vanishing in 1895. However, some bridges continue to be privately owned and subject to tolls.

The Local Government Act 1888 created county councils and gave them responsibility for maintaining the major roads. The abiding relic of the English toll roads is the number of houses with names like "Turnpike Cottage", the inclusion of "Bar" in place names and occasional road name: Turnpike Lane in northern London has given its name to an Underground station.

=== Since the 1960s ===
Following the abolition of turnpikes a few private roads and toll bridges remained. Some bridges of the turnpike era were built by companies (rather than trusts) and have continued to charge tolls. Tolls on some bridges were abolished by county councils buying up the tolls and then declaring them county bridges. A recent example of this relates to the well-known Cob at Porthmadog, where tolls ceased in 2003, when it was nationalised by the Welsh Assembly.

Tolls are similarly collected to finance the cost of building the Humber Bridge and Severn Bridge. In recent times, the concept of charging tolls to finance the building of roads has been revived, but so far the only new toll road is M6 Toll.

Tolls for the Forth Road Bridge were removed in 2008 following a divisive three-year political debate during which it was proposed that variable congestion pricing tolls would be introduced.

== Current tolls ==
=== Roads ===
- M6 Toll
- College Road, Dulwich
- Marine Drive, Llandudno
- Penmon, Anglesey
- Porlock Hill, Somerset (The less inclined toll road not the main A39)
- Sandwich Bay, Kent

=== Bridges and tunnels ===
- Aldwark Bridge (1772)
- Dartford Crossing (1963 and 1981)
- Cartford Bridge
- Humber Bridge
- Itchen Bridge
- Mersey Tunnels (1934 and 1971)
- Tamar Bridge (1961)
- Tyne Tunnel (1967)
- Mersey Gateway (Cheshire) (2017)
- Silver Jubilee Bridge (1961) Tolls introduced in 2021.
- Bathampton Toll Bridge
- Blackwall Tunnel (1897 and 1967) Tolls introduced in April 2025 alongside opening of Silvertown Tunnel.
- Silvertown Tunnel (2025)

=== Congestion zones ===
- London congestion charge
- Durham congestion charge
- Oxford congestion charge (2025)

=== Low emission zones ===
- Bath Clean Air Zone
- Birmingham Clean Air Zone
- Bradford Clean Air Zone
- Bristol Clean Air Zone
- London low emission zone
- Newcastle and Gateshead Clean Air Zone
- Oxford Zero Emission Zone
- Portsmouth Clean Air Zone
- Sheffield Clean Air Zone
- Ultra Low Emission Zone (London)

== See also ==
- Road pricing in the United Kingdom
- Toll roads in Europe
- Toll bridge
- Drovers' road, a route for droving livestock on foot from one place to another, such as to market or between summer and winter pasture
- Causey Mounth, an ancient drovers' road over the coastal fringe of the Grampian Mountains in Aberdeenshire, Scotland.
