= Zero-emissions vehicle =

Class of motor vehicle

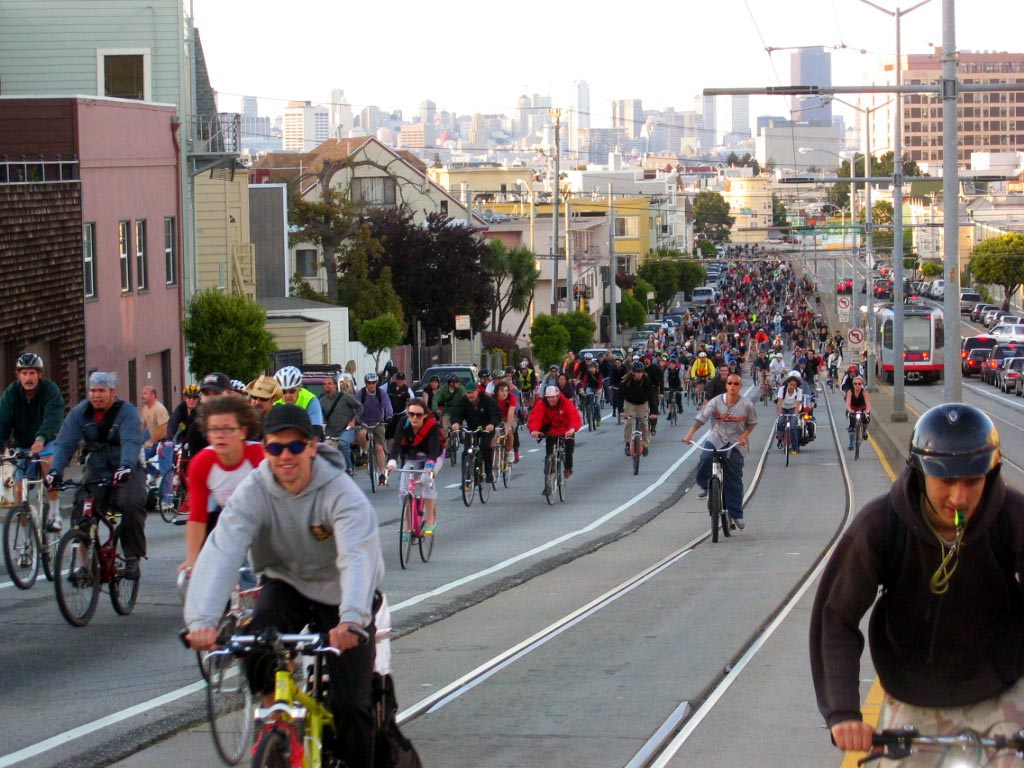
Critical Mass cyclists, San Francisco, April 29, 2005, and Muni Metro electric tram on J Church line

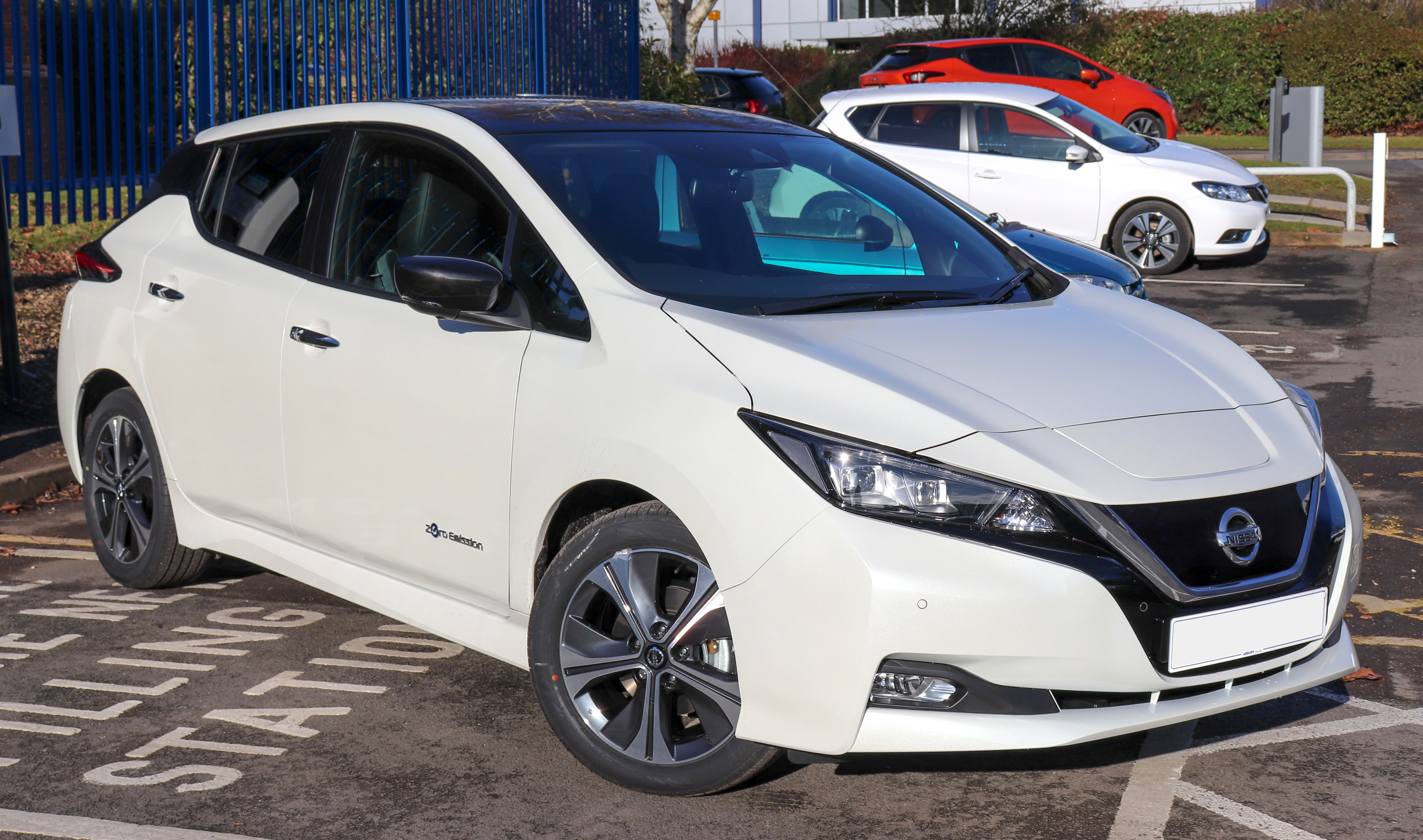
The Nissan Leaf electric car is a zero emission vehicle (ZEV).

A zero-emission vehicle (ZEV) is a vehicle that does not emit exhaust gas or other pollutants from the onboard source of power. The California definition also adds that this includes under any and all possible operational modes and conditions. This is because under cold-start conditions for example, internal combustion engines tend to produce the maximum amount of pollutants. In a number of countries and states, transport is cited as the main source of greenhouse gases (GHG) and other pollutants. The desire to reduce this is thus politically strong.

== Terminology ==
Harmful pollutants to the health and the environment include particulates (soot), hydrocarbons, carbon monoxide, ozone, lead, and various oxides of nitrogen. Although not considered emission pollutants by the original California Air Resources Board (CARB) or U.S. Environmental Protection Agency (EPA) definitions, the most recent common use of the term also includes volatile organic compounds, several toxic airborne compounds (such as 1,3-Butadiene), and pollutants of global significance such as carbon dioxide and other greenhouse gases.

Examples of zero-emission vehicle with different power sources can include muscle-powered vehicles such as bicycles, electric bicycles, and gravity racers.

=== Motor vehicles ===
Also other battery electric vehicles, which may shift emissions to the location where the electricity is generated (if the electricity comes from coal or natural gas power plants—as opposed to hydro-electric, wind power, solar power or nuclear power plants); and fuel cell vehicles powered by hydrogen, which may shift emissions to the location where the hydrogen is generated. It does not include hydrogen internal combustion engine vehicles because these do generate some emissions (although being near-emissionless). It also does not include vehicles running on 100% biofuel as these also emit exhaust gases, despite being carbon neutral overall.

Emissions from the manufacturing process are thus not included in this definition, and it has been argued that the emissions that are created during manufacture are currently of an order of magnitude that is comparable to the emissions that are created during a vehicle's operating lifetime.

However, these vehicles are in the early stages of their development; the manufacturing emissions may decrease by the development of technology, industry, shifting toward mass production and the ever-increasing use of renewable energy throughout the supply-chains.

== History ==
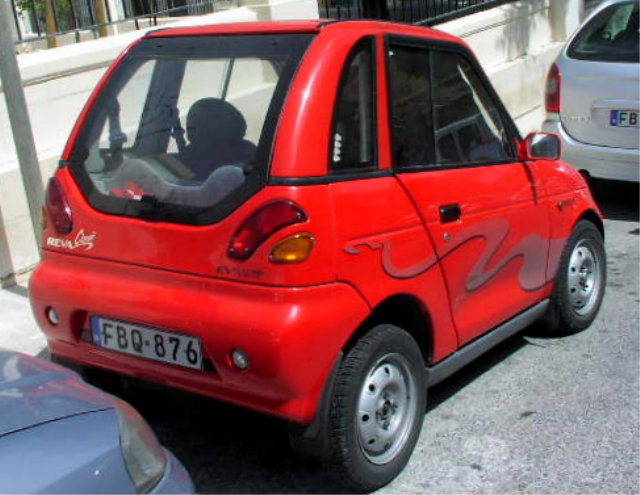
The Indian REVA electric car is a zero emissions vehicle (ZEV).

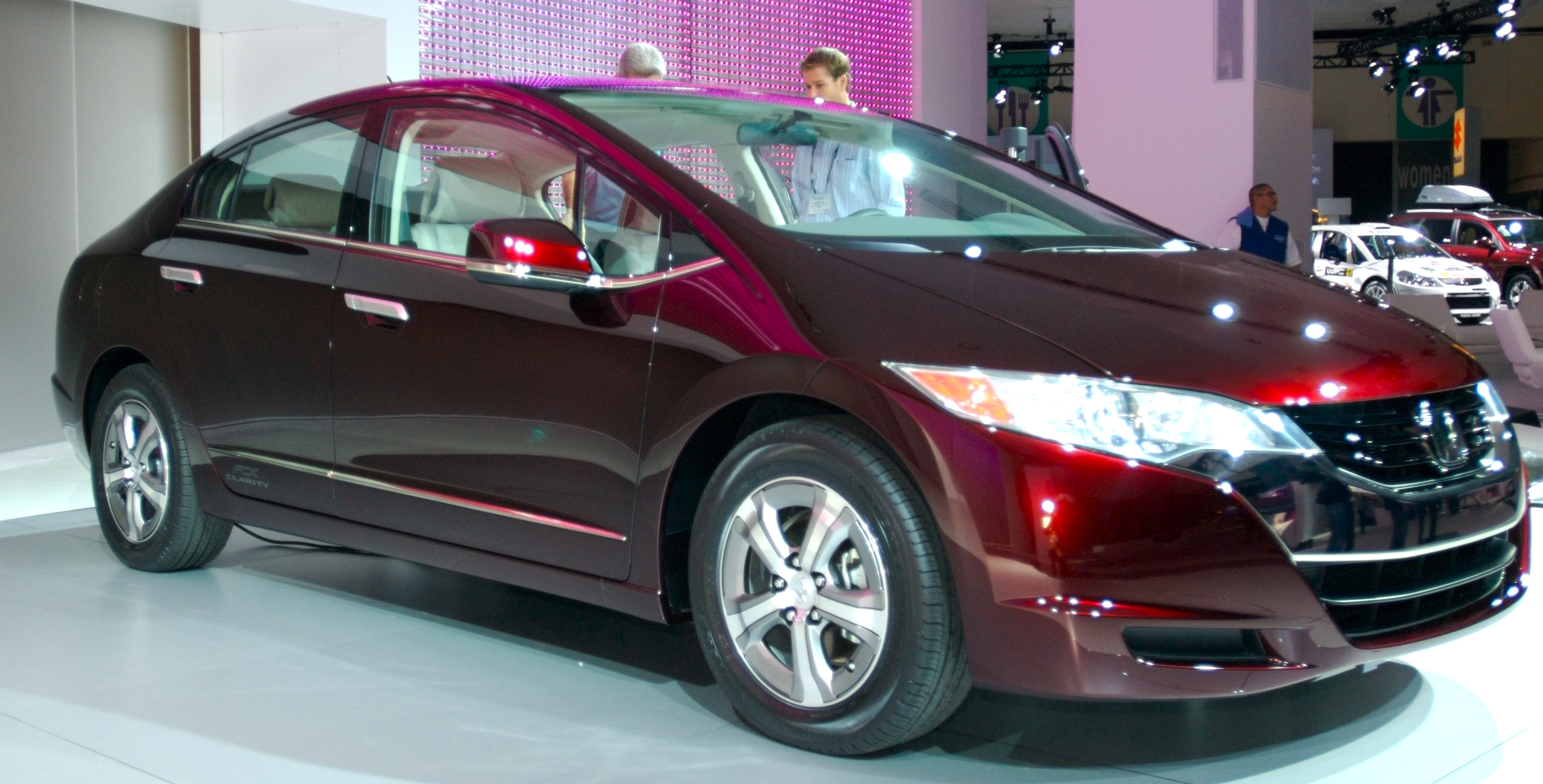
The Honda FCX Clarity, launched in 2008, is a fuel cell hydrogen vehicle compliant with the ZEV standard and sold in Japan and in the U.S. (only in Los Angeles).

=== Well-to-wheel emissions ===
The term zero-emissions or ZEV, as originally coined by the California Air Resources Board (CARB), refers only to motor vehicle emissions from the onboard source of power. Therefore, CARB's definition is accounting only for pollutants emitted at the point of the vehicle operation, and the clean air benefits are usually local because depending on the source of the electricity used to recharge the batteries, air pollutant emissions are shifted to the location of the electricity generation plants. In a broader perspective, the electricity used to recharge the batteries must be generated from renewable or clean sources such as wind, solar, hydroelectric, or nuclear power for ZEVs to have almost none or zero well-to-wheel emissions. In other words, if ZEVs are recharged from electricity generated by fossil fuel plants, they cannot be considered as zero emissions.

However, the spread of electrical-powered vehicles can help the development of systems for charging the EV batteries from excess electricity which cannot be used otherwise. For instance, electricity demand is lowest at night and the excess generated electricity at this time can be used for recharging the EVs' batteries. It is worth mentioning that renewable sources such as wind turbines or solar panels are less controllable in terms of the amount of generated electricity compared to fossil fuel power plants; most renewable energy sources are intermittent energy sources. Therefore, development of these resources will lead to excess energy which can be better used by development of EVs. Moreover, most EVs can benefit from regenerative brakes and other optimization systems which increases the energy efficiency in these vehicles.

Fuel cell vehicles (FCVs) can help even more in terms of the development of sustainable energy sources because these cars use hydrogen as their fuel. Compressed hydrogen can be used as an energy storage element, while electricity must be stored in batteries. The hydrogen can be produced by electricity through electrolysis, and this electricity can come from green sources. Hydrogen can be produced in situ, e.g. excess at wind farm when the generated electricity is not needed, or it can be connected to the grid to use the excess electricity from the grid and produce electricity, e.g. at hydrogen pump stations. As a result, development of FCVs can be a big step toward sustainable development and reducing GHG emission in a long-term perspective.

Other countries have a different definition of ZEV, noteworthy the more recent inclusion of greenhouse gases, as many European rules now regulate CO_{2} emissions. CARB's role in regulating greenhouse gases began in 2004 based on the 2002 Pavley Act (AB 1493), but was blocked by lawsuits and by the EPA in 2007, by rejecting the required waiver. Additional responsibilities were granted to CARB by California's Global Warming Solutions Act of 2006 (AB 32), which includes the mandate to set low-carbon fuel standards.

As a result of an investigation into false advertising regarding "zero-emissions" claims, the Advertising Standards Authority (ASA) in the UK ruled in March 2010 to ban an advertisement from Renault UK regarding its "zero-emission vehicles" because the ad breached CAP (Broadcast) TV Code rules 5.1.1, 5.1.2 (Misleading advertising) and 5.2.1 (Misleading advertising- Evidence) and 5.2.6 (Misleading advertising-Environmental claims.)

Greenhouse gases and other pollutant emissions are generated by vehicle manufacturing processes. The emissions from manufacturing are many factors larger than the emissions from tailpipes, even in gasoline engine vehicles. Most reports on ZEVs' impact to the climate do not take into account these manufacturing emissions, though over the lifetime of the car the emissions from manufacturing are relatively small.

Considering the 2018 U.S. energy mix, a ZEV would produce an average 58% reduction in carbon dioxide emissions per mile driven. Relative to energy mixes in other countries at that time, it has been predicted that such emissions would decrease by 40% in the U.K. and 19% in China.

== Types of zero-emission vehicles ==
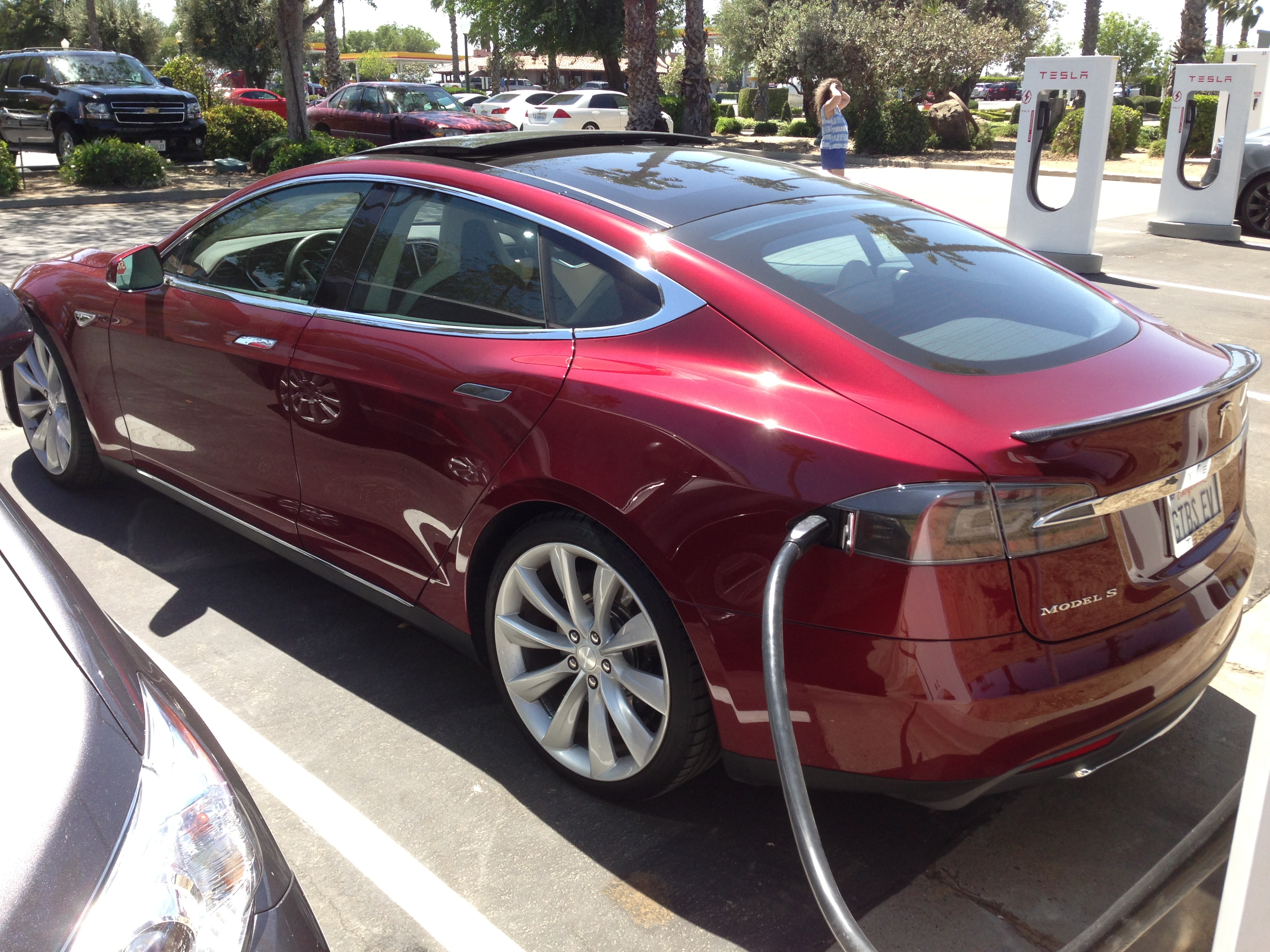
The Tesla Model S electric car is a zero-emission vehicle (ZEV) declared 2013 World Green Car of the Year.

Apart from animal-powered and human-powered vehicles, battery electric vehicles (which include cars, aircraft and boats) also do not emit any of the above pollutants, nor any CO_{2} gases during use. This is a particularly important quality in densely populated areas, where the health of residents can be severely affected. However, the production of the fuels that power ZEVs, such as the production of hydrogen from fossil fuels, may produce more emissions per mile than the emissions produced from a conventional fossil fueled vehicle. A well-to-wheel life cycle assessment is necessary to understand the emissions implications associated with operating a ZEV.

=== Bicycles ===
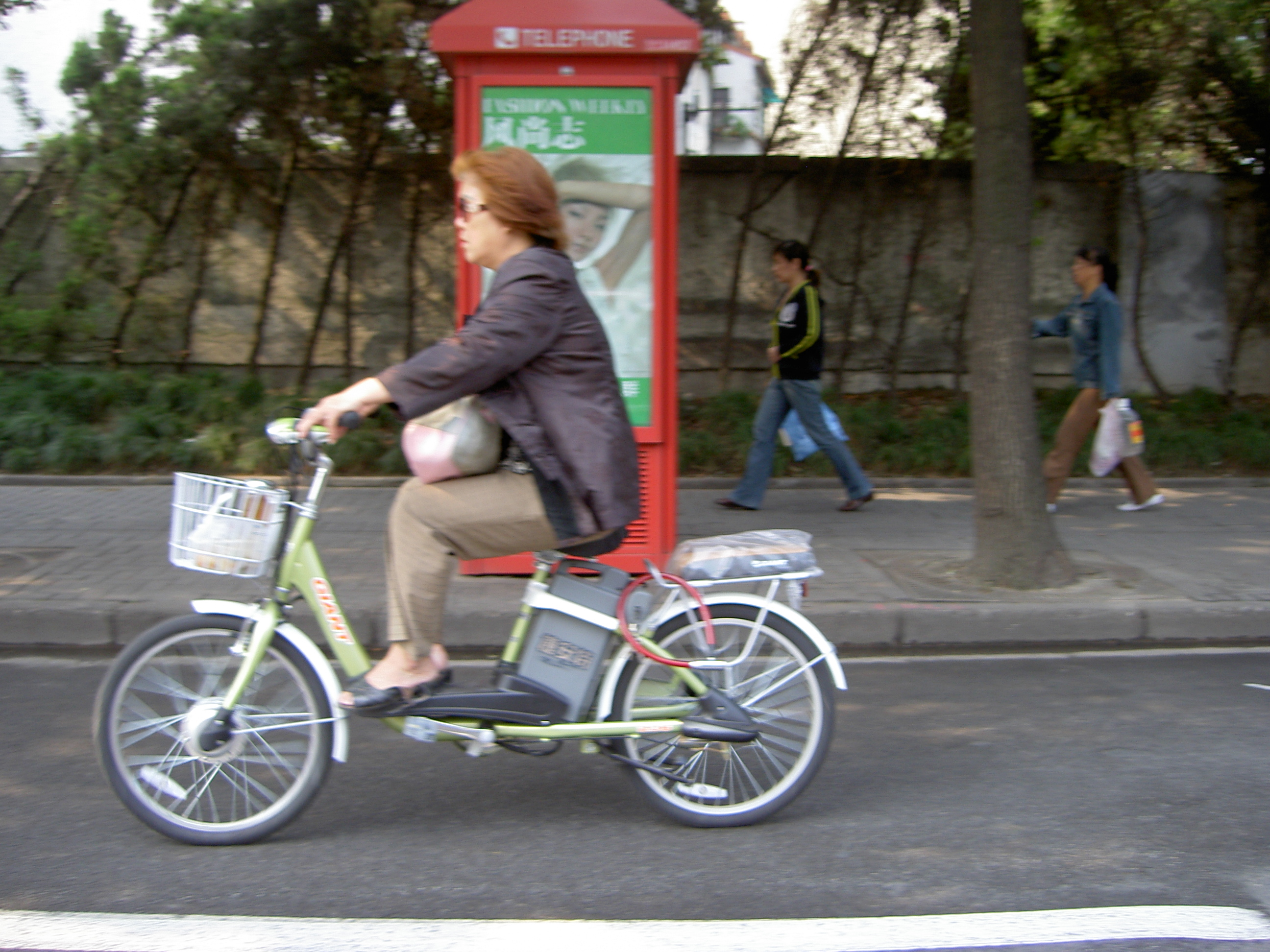
A rider on an electric bicycle in China

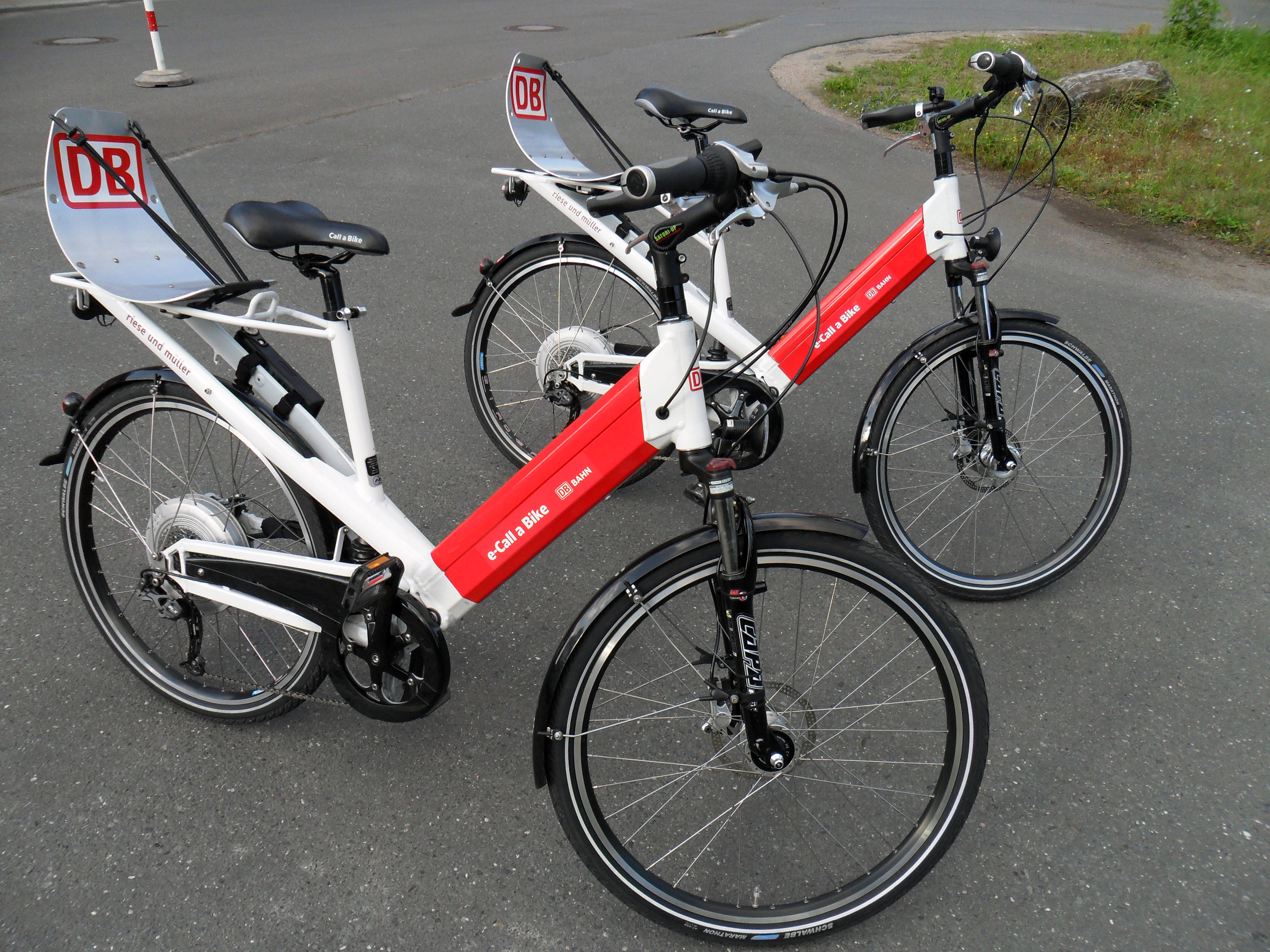
Electric bike-share bicycles in Germany

In the mid-19th century, bicycle ownership became common (during the bike boom)—predating mass car ownership. In the 1960s, the Flying Pigeon bicycle became the single most popular mechanized vehicle on the planet. Some 210 million electric bikes are on the road in China.

=== Motor vehicles ===
Segway Personal Transporters are two-wheeled, self-balancing, battery-powered machines that are eleven times more energy-efficient than the average American car. Operating on two lithium-ion batteries, the Segway PT produces zero emissions during operation, and utilizes a negligible amount of electricity while charging via a standard wall outlet.

=== Marine ===
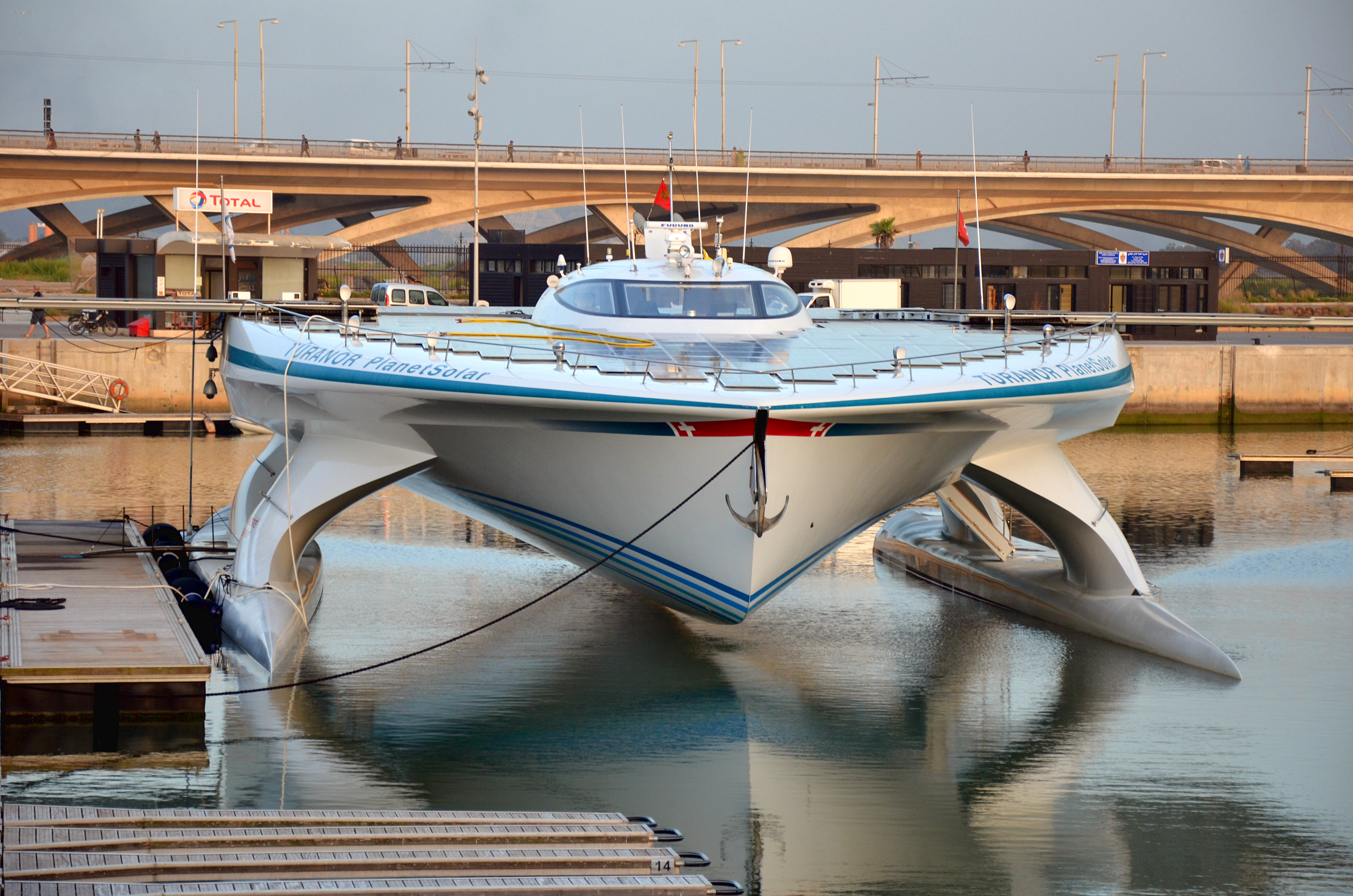
A PlanetSolar electric boat

Wind-powered land vehicles operating on wind exist (using wind turbines and kites). For boats and other watercraft, regular and special sails (as rotorsails, wing sails, turbo sails, skysails) exist that can propel them without emissions.

=== Air ===
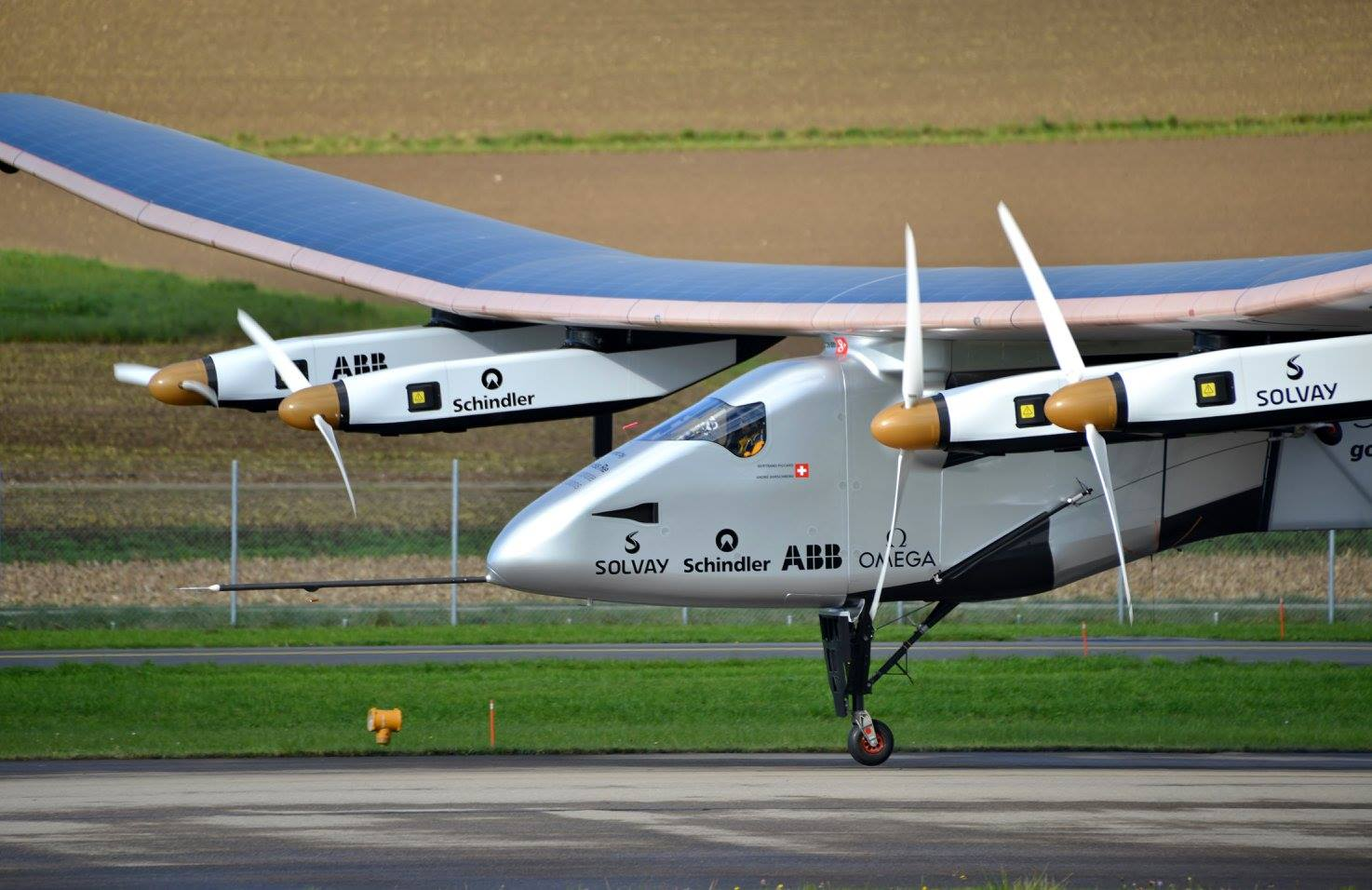
A Solar Impulse 2 electric aircraft

An electric aircraft is an aircraft powered by electric motors. Electricity may be supplied by a variety of methods including batteries, ground power cables, solar cells, ultracapacitors, fuel cells and power beaming. Between 2015 and 2016, Solar Impulse 2 completed a circumnavigation of the Earth using solar power.

== Incentives ==
=== Subsidies for public transport ===
Japanese public transport is being driven in the direction of zero emissions due to growing environmental concern. Honda has launched a conceptual bus which features exercise machines to the rear of the vehicle to generate kinetic energy used for propulsion.

Due to the stop-start nature of idling in public transport, regenerative braking may be a possibility for public transport systems of the future.

=== Subsidies for development of electric cars ===
In an attempt to curb carbon emissions as well as noise pollution in South African cities, the South African Department of Science & Technology (DST), as well as other private investments, have made US$5 million available through the Innovation Fund for the development of the Joule. The Joule is a five-seater car, planned to be released in 2014. However the company ceased trading in 2012.

=== Low and zero emission zones ===
Several cities have implemented low-emission zones. Launched in 2019 and set to expand in 2023, the implementation of London's Ultra Low Emission Zone (ULEZ) incentivizes and accelerates the widespread adoption of cleaner vehicles through setting daily charge rates for driving vehicles that are non-compliant with ULEZ emission standards. Oxford was the first city in Britain to introduce a zero emission zone in February 2022 where electric vehicles can enter free of charge while other vehicles can pay up to £10 to drive in the zone between 07:00 and 19:00.

=== Phasing out fossil fuel vehicles ===
Aside from direct incentives towards zero emission vehicles, governments also introduce measures to phase out fossil fuel vehicles. This leaves zero emission vehicles as the main vehicle option available.

== See also ==
- List of electric cars currently available – Battery powered cars
- Coda Automotive – Former American electric vehicle manufacturer
- Electric rickshaw – Electric passenger vehicle
- GM EV1 – Subcompact electric car
- Green vehicle – Environmentally friendly vehicles
- Human–electric hybrid vehicle – Vehicle type
- Hybrid vehicle – Vehicle using two or more power sources
- Hydrogen vehicle – Vehicle that uses hydrogen fuel for motive power
- Low-carbon fuel standard – Rule to reduce carbon intensity of transportation fuels (LCFS)
- Low-emission vehicle
- Miles per gallon gasoline equivalent – Measurement of fuel economy
- Optimal Energy Joule
- Partial zero-emissions vehicle – Automobile type
- Personal automated transport – Public transport mode
- Super-ultra-low-emission vehicle – U.S. classification for passenger vehicle emissions (SULEV)
- Shweeb – Proposed personal rapid transit network
- Renault Z.E. – Electric automobile model
- Tesla, Inc. – American electric vehicle and clean energy company
- Tier (emission standard) – Vehicle emission regulations
- Ultra-low-emission vehicle (ULEV)
- Who Killed the Electric Car? – 2006 documentary film
- Zero-carbon city – City that has no carbon footprint
- Zero emission – Machinery or process that does not emit pollutants
- ZENN – Canadian electric car (Zero Emission, No Noise)
