= John Wright (professor) =

British Health Figure

John Wright is a British specialist in epidemiology, an applied researcher, and a doctor in the National Health Service (NHS). He established the Bradford Institute for Health Research, based at Bradford Royal Infirmary, in 2007, based at the Bradford Teaching Hospitals NHS Foundation Trust.

His interests in early life health and disease prevention led to his launching the Born in Bradford longitudinal birth cohort – a research study that has been featured as a long-running BBC Radio 4 radio series 3 hosted by Winifred Robinson for more than a decade.

The project also played a key role in cementing Bradford's successful bid to become UK City of Culture in 2025. Wright also designed a first-of-its-kind study that uses medical research to measure the benefits arts and culture can have on the health and wellbeing of the local population.

He has authored over 500 papers and been awarded over £160 million in research award funding, £60 million as chief investigator.

== Professional career ==
Wright became a consultant in clinical epidemiology at Bradford Royal Infirmary in 1996 and authored three books on health needs assessment, global public health and clinical governance. In 2004 he was appointed Director of Research.

He established the Born in Bradford longitudinal birth cohort study in 2006. The study recruited almost 14,000 mothers and their partners in pregnancy and has followed the lives of 13,500 children born in the city between 2007 and 2011.

In January 2022, plans were unveiled by Wright to build on this study by launching a new health research project called Age of Wonder with the aim of tracking more than 30,000 adolescents on their journey into adulthood. The seven-year study was backed by a £7m grant from the Wellcome Trust.

He leads the ActEarly City Collaboratory programme, funded by the Medical Research Council to develop ways to improve the health and life chances of children living in deprived communities.

He established the Bradford Institute for Health Research in 2007, uniting NHS organisations and the University of Bradford, University of Leeds and University of York to develop a centre for applied health research. In 2019 he established the Wolfson Centre for Applied Health Research.

He set up the Yorkshire and Humber Improvement Academy in 2013 to support the translation of research evidence into clinical practice. In 2017 he established the Connected Bradford programme to safely and securely link health, education, environmental and social care data for over 600,000 citizens.

He has run an international health partnership with Good Shepherd Hospital in the Lubombo region of Swaziland for over 25 years. In 2002, the link-up benefited from a donation 31 from the Foundation set up by the British singer, pianist and composer Sir Elton John to help fight AIDS. In 2021, he was instrumental in launching City of Research, a new initiative to encourage more volunteers from across Bradford, Airedale and Craven to sign up to take part in health research.

He is also a strong advocate of the new Clean Air Zone being introduced across Bradford Under his leadership, Bradford was recognized as a leading research-recruiting hospital in England for the first time in 2024.

== Awards and recognition ==
He was elected a Fellow of Faculty of Public Health in 2001, Fellow of the Royal College of Physicians in 2005 and Fellow of the Royal Society of Arts in 2022

In 2015 he was awarded the Ebola Medal for Service in West Africa, known simply as the Ebola Medal, for his work in leading the response to the Ebola epidemic in Sierra Leone with Médecins du Monde, also known as Doctors of the World.

It was the first time a medal had been created specifically to recognise those who have tackled a humanitarian crisis. He reported from the frontline on this work in the BBC Radio 4 series Ebola: Six Weeks To Save The World.

In 2020, he was awarded an Honorary Degree of Doctor of Health by the University of Bradford for his long-standing contribution to the field of healthcare and support for the university and wider Bradford community and by the University of Bristol in 2023.

He is visiting professor at the University of Bradford, University of Leeds and University of York in the UK as well as the University of Adelaide, Australia.
