= Birmingham Clean Air Zone =

Birmingham UK vehicle charging zone

- Birmingham Clean Air Zone traffic sign symbol
- Location: Birmingham
- Launched: 1 June 2021
- Technology: Fixed and mobile CCTV; Number plate recognition
- Manager: Birmingham City Council
- Currency: Pound sterling
- Retailed: Online; Telephone; Post
- Website: www.brumbreathes.co.uk

Birmingham Clean Air Zone (CAZ) is an area of central Birmingham, England where traffic is restricted to reduce air pollution. It became the third UK Clean Air Zone, after London and Bath, when it launched on 1 June 2021. A study of the zone’s effectiveness, published in 2023, found mixed results, with "modest, but significant reductions" in nitrogen dioxide but "no detectable impact in the concentrations of fine particles... the air pollutant with greatest health effects".

== Implementation ==
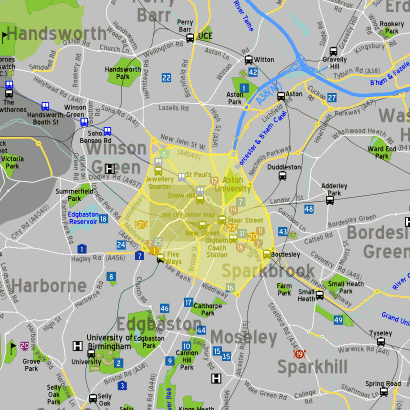
The Birmingham Clean Air Zone is the area inside the A4540 Middleway ring road (yellow), not including the road itself.

The zone covers the urban area inside the A4540 Middleway ring road, excluding the road itself, but including the Jewellery Quarter, the Chinese Quarter, the main shopping district, the area around Birmingham New Street railway station, and the rest of Birmingham city centre. Noncompliant vehicles that enter the zone are charged £8 per day (for private cars, taxis and vans) or £50 per day (for HGVs, coaches, and buses), with no charge for other vehicles. Compliance is defined according to European emissions standards, with the Birmingham scheme adopting class D of the A–D classification system.

== History ==
The idea of road pricing in the United Kingdom dates back to 1964, when the Smeed Report proposed that road users should pay the costs roads impose on society. After the London Congestion Charge Zone (CCZ) was introduced in 2003, around 30 other local authorities were expected to follow suit, although most, including Birmingham, failed to bring forward firm proposals at that time. In an interview with The Guardian that year, transport writer and commentator Christian Wolmar suggested this was because councils feared a backlash from motorists and lobbying groups.

The scheme gained new momentum in 2017 after the European Commission warned Birmingham City Council to reduce air pollution by 2020 or face a £60 million fine.

In 2018, the Council published a business case for its plan, then costed at £68.7 million. The plan was backed by the British Heart Foundation, which said "In order to protect everyone living in Birmingham, it is vital that bold action is taken on air quality. A Clean Air Zone in the city will be a crucial step forward, as this is the most cost-effective way to tackle polluted air and minimise the damaging effect that it has on people’s heart health." Opponents launched a protest group, Campaign Against Birmingham Clean Air Zone Charges, in 2018, arguing the scheme would "turn the city into a ghost town".

The British government approved the plan in 2019, but the scheme was delayed the following year by the COVID-19 pandemic. An opinion survey of 8000 Birmingham residents published by the Council in June 2020 found "Nearly 80% were in favour of measures to reduce car emissions, with 63% not wanting to return to the levels of pollution we had prior to the pandemic.... [and] 71% of... respondents backing the introduction of Zero Emission Zones to discourage high-polluting cars from entering cities".

Although some businesses and local councillors called for a further postponement of the scheme during the pandemic, Birmingham City Council leader Ian Ward refused, noting: "The government has made it crystal clear it will not tolerate any further delay". When the plan was put forward again, businesses still recovering from lockdowns expressed concern about its potential economic impact.

According to a report in The Guardian, shortly before the scheme was implemented in 2021, opponents published Facebook advertising urging people to oppose what they described as a "war on motorists" and a "travel tax", while the Birmingham Mail noted how a local MP had branded it a "tax on the poor".

The scheme was finally launched on 1 June 2021.

== Impact ==
In the month after the introduction of the charge, the number of the most polluting vehicles entering the zone each day dropped from 18,787 to just over 11,000, and compliance rose from 73.8% to 80.4%. Around 40,000 drivers a month were fined for non-compliance at the start of 2023 (down from approximately 50,000 a month a year earlier), though around 10,000 drivers in total have successfully appealed their fines.

According to Birmingham City Council, nitrogen dioxide (NO_{2}) levels fell by 13 percent during the first six months of the scheme's implementation, with a halving of the number of polluting vehicles driving through the city centre. However, a Birmingham University study published in August 2023 found the zone had produced more "modest, but significant reductions in NO_{2} of up to 7.3%", but "no detectable impact in the concentrations of fine particles, PM2.5 – the air pollutant with greatest health effects". A report by the Council in January 2025 found the scheme had made a "significant contribution" to reducing nitrogen dioxide, but noted that Moor Street Queensway and the A38 St Chads Queensway still sometimes exceed the legal limit for NO_{2}.

In the first two years of the scheme's operation, Birmingham City Council raised £79 million from it in fees and penalties. Some of the revenue raised from the scheme was earmarked for green transport projects, including car-free school streets, improvements in cycle paths, and expansion of 20mph zones.

In August 2023, The Telegraph reported that the scheme "is piling extra costs onto small businesses", quoting "local entrepreneurs" and residents affected by higher delivery costs and linking the issue to what it described as a wider backlash against anti-pollution policies, including London's expanded ULEZ scheme.

== See also ==
- Low-emission zone
- Transport in Birmingham
- Oxford zero emission zone, where all non-electric vehicles are effected
