= Bradford Clean Air Zone =

Clean air zone in Bradford, England

- Bradford Clean Air Zone traffic sign symbol
- Location: Bradford, West Yorkshire, England
- Launched: 26 September 2022
- Currency: Pound sterling
- Website: Charging page

Bradford Clean Air Zone is a road traffic low-emission programme in the City of Bradford in West Yorkshire, England. Plans were advanced for many cities in England to have Clean Air Zones (CAZ), but of the ones put forward in West Yorkshire, only Bradford's CAZ has been taken to an operational stage. The scheme commenced on 26 September 2022, and all vehicles, barring private cars and motorbikes, must be compliant with the scheme or face a charge for entering into the zone. The programme aims to help the district comply with legal limits for air quality.

== History ==
Plans were developed in the late 2010s for several Yorkshire cities to have "clean air zones" (CAZ) – Bradford, Leeds, Sheffield, and whilst Leeds postponed their plans, Bradford Council have pressed ahead with theirs, which gained approval in March 2021 for a launch in January of the following year. Sheffield's CAZ started operating in February 2023 and the proposed scheme in Leeds was halted due drops in projected levels of nitrogen dioxide as the ciy's investment in low pollution schemes showed considerable benefits. At this time there was also fall in nitrogen dioxide levels, this fall was attributed to the COVID-19 pandemic lockdowns, which resulted in less traffic on the region's roads. The maximum legal limit of nitrogen dioxide pollution in the United Kingdom is 40 micrograms (0.00062 gr) per cubic metre. In the City of Bradford district, levels have been found to be 45.3 micrograms (0.000699 gr) on Queens Road (Canal Road), 48.8 micrograms (0.000753 gr) on Market Street in the city centre, and as high as 50.6 micrograms (0.000781 gr) on Shipley Airedale Road (in Bradford). The programme is to help combat pollution within the city (and wider district) which has been ordered, by ministerial direction, to reduce pollution levels being beyond legal limits for air quality. The area within the zone around Bradford City Centre follows the line of the A6177 city ring road. The northern section includes Canal Road and the A650 road to the Bingley bypass, including Saltaire and most of Shipley up to the Fox Corner Junction in Shipley.

It was revealed in 2021, that Bradford Council had been given £39.3 million of UK Government money to implement the scheme and to allow grants to be awarded to users such as taxi firms, minibus and bus firms, and hauliers, allowing them to adapt existing vehicles to greener emission status, or to procure new vehicles entirely. By September 2022, 87% of taxis in the city were compliant with the new clean air zone, 370 buses had been upgraded for compliance, and 33 new electric buses had been procured to work routes in and out of the city centre.

Locally, Bradford Council have presented the clean air zone programme under the title of "Breathe better Bradford" (stylized as breathe better BRADFORD). The health and economic impacts of the CAZ is being assessed by researchers at the Bradford Institute for Health Research ('Born in Bradford'), the University of Leeds and University of York. The scheme was welcomed by campaigners for cleaner air, with one group, Asthma and Lung UK stating that Bradford had the worst hospitalisation rate in Yorkshire of children with breathing difficulties. However, some protested a tax on vehicles entering the city, stating that the cost would "cripple small businesses particularly at a time when people are struggling with the cost of living crisis." The director of the Bradford Institute for Health Research pointed out that "..almost half the schools in Bradford will be in the Clean Air Zone, and so our children will be shielded from the toxic effects of traffic-related air pollution."

Initially set to be launched in January 2022, the project was delayed, and went live on 26 September 2022. The delays to the rollout were criticised by some taxi firms, who said that drivers had been forced to take out extensive short-term loans so that they could upgrade their cars for the deadline in January, only for the scheme to be pushed back to spring 2022.

== Charging ==
The UK Government has set out the definitions of four schemes (labelled as A, B, C, and D. Bradford opted for a C-scheme (meaning it is referred to as a C-CAZ), which would see charges for all vehicles except for private cars and motorbikes. ANPR cameras have been installed around the city centre, and along the Shipley/Bradford corridor, to monitor vehicles entering the zone. At the launch in September 2022, drivers of buses and HGVs which did not conform to the approved ratings would be fined £50, vans and minibuses £9, and taxis £7. For each fine doled out, the UK Government would be paid £2. The charging time is to be classified as a day from midnight to midnight, not 24 hours from when a vehicle enters the zone. However, vehicles can leave and re-enter the zone several times between the midnight to midnight period, and only be charged once. (Note: In essence, a vehicle entering the CAZ at 23:59 and staying in the zone until 00:01 the following morning, would be charged twice, what the authorities called "crossing the midnight threshold".)

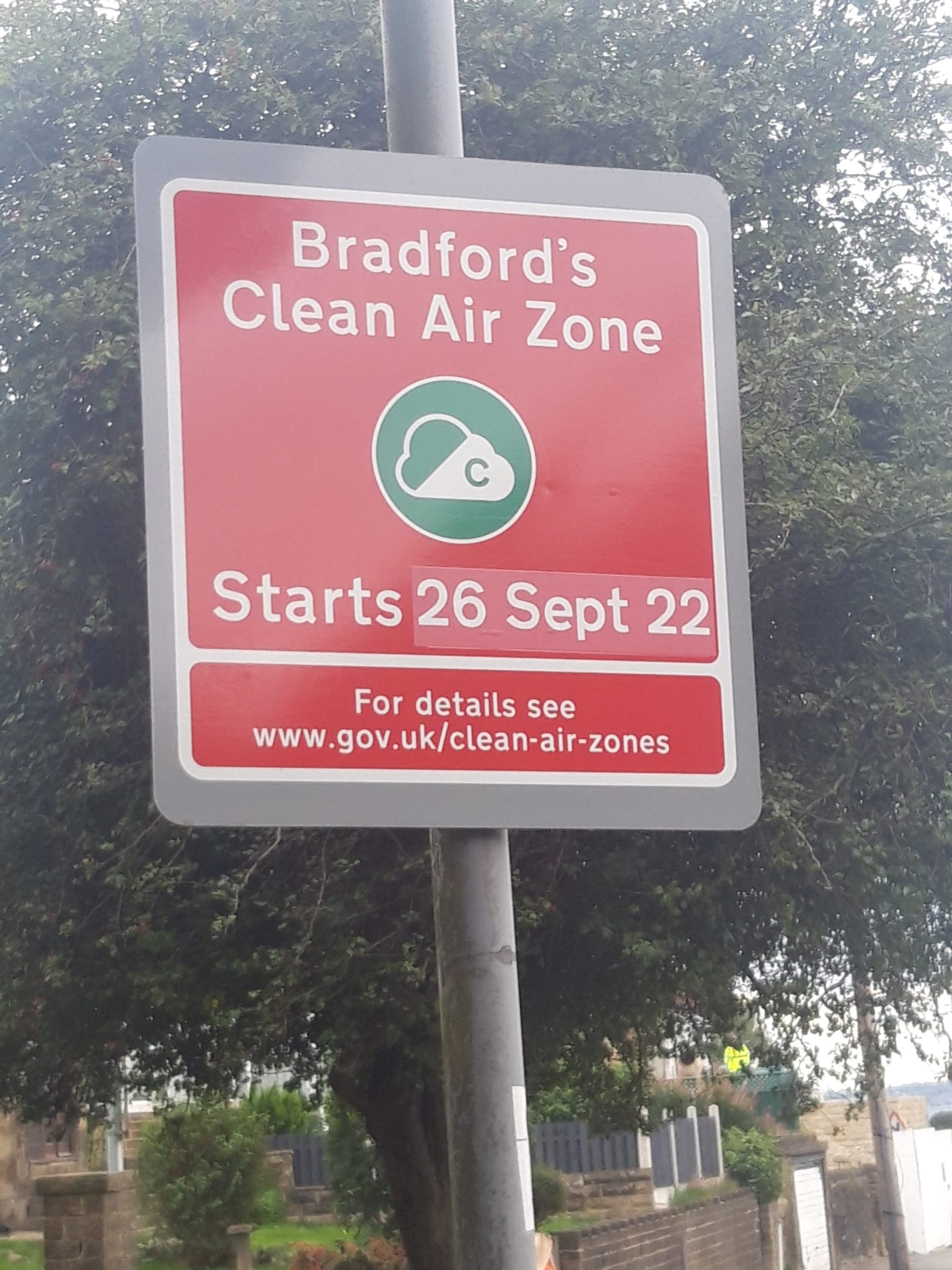
Signage for Bradford's Clean Air Zone

Bradford C-CAZ charging and details
Type	Symbol	Charging (Note: For non-compliant vehicles)	Exemptions
HGV		check	Those fitted to take Euro 6 Diesel (as a minimum), or alternative fuels
Bus		check	Those fitted to take Euro 6 Diesel (as a minimum), or alternative fuels. Certain school buses would be exempt.
Coach		check	Those fitted to take Euro 6 Diesel (as a minimum), or alternative fuels. Exemptions also exist for those "undertaking educational, charity, or social value work".
Minibus		check	Those fitted to take Euro 6 Diesel (as a minimum), or Euro 4 LPG. Exemptions also exist for those "undertaking educational, charity, or social value work".
Light goods vehicle (LGV)		check	Those fitted to take Euro 6 Diesel (as a minimum), or Euro 4 LPG.
Taxi (Hackney Carriage)		check	Those fitted to take Euro 6 Diesel (as a minimum), or Euro 4 LPG.
Private hire taxi		check	Euro 5/6 Petrol Hybrid LPG (Euro 5 petrol)
Private car		☒	Charging not applicable for private cars or motorbikes. Also exempted are horse-boxes, campervans and motor-homes.

In December 2022, it was revealed that over £1.8 million in charges had been accrued from fines and levies over a twelve-week period from the start date in September. Over £180,000 of which would be paid to central government under the charging scheme, the rest would be ring-fenced by Bradford City Council for anti-emission projects.

== Benefits ==
A report issued in November 2024, stated that the reduced emissions had led to over 700 fewer GP appointments per month in the first year of the air zone's operation. This was estimated to have saved the local NHS over £30,000 per month.
