= Captain Gatso =

English activist

Captain Gatso (born in the late 1960s) is a pseudonymous England-based political activist involved in motorists' rights, specifically relating to speed limit enforcement. The name derives from speed cameras, some of which are manufactured by Gatsometer BV and referred to by the abbreviation Gatso.

Gatso has said that he "may or may not be" the campaign director of Motorists Against Detection (MAD), a group which claimed responsibility for speed camera destruction and damage in 2003. Gatso wore a plastic Tony Blair mask during stunts and photo ops, in reference to the prime minister of the time. He said in a 2004 interview that he has "never gone round disabling cameras" personally.

In August 2023 a caller to TalkTV identifying themselves as Captain Gatso claimed to be the campaign director of the 'Blade Runners', a group who have sabotaged surveillance cameras in London in response to the expansion of the city's Ultra Low Emission Zone.
