= Clean Air Zone =

Air quality improvement measures in a city

- Clean Air Zone traffic sign symbol
- Location: See § List of Clean Air Zones
- Launched: 5 March 2021 (in Bath)

A Clean Air Zone (CAZ) is an area, such as a city or part of a city, where targeted action is taken to improve air quality. One definition is "a specified area in which vehicles are required to meet minimum emission standards." Action is often aimed at city transport. However some cities describe their general clean air program as a CAZ and the traffic part as a low-emission zone.

The main purpose of a CAZ is to reduce deaths and disease from air pollution. Other benefits may include increased productivity and road safety. Public consultation is key when trying to create a CAZ. When creating a CAZ public transport may be upgraded.

Breathe Cities is a collaboration between Bloomberg Philanthropies, Clean Air Fund and C40 Cities which supports cities to have cleaner air by helping with data, awareness, policymaking and co-operation between cities.

== Benefits ==
Children's lungs may be healthier. Cardiovascular health may be improved. Workforce productivity may increase due to less sickness.

== United Kingdom ==
Whether a vehicle is charged when entering or moving through a CAZ depends on the type of vehicle and the Euro standard of the vehicle. The amount charged is up to the local authority responsible for the CAZ. Ultra-low-emission vehicles are not charged when entering or moving through a Clean Air Zone.

=== Classes of charging Clean Air Zone ===
Class	Vehicle	Euro Category	Charge applies to vehicles below this Euro standard
Class A	Bus (Note: Gross Vehicle Weight (GVW) more than 5,000 kilograms (5.0 t) and carries 8 or more passengers.); Coach	M3	Euro VI
Class A	Taxi and private hire	M2, M1	Euro 6 (diesel); Euro 4 (petrol)
Class B	Bus; Coach	M3	Euro VI
Class B	Heavy goods vehicle (HGV) (Note: Goods vehicles with a Gross Vehicle Weight (GVW) over 3,500 kilograms (3.5 t).)	N2, N3	Euro VI
Class B	Taxi and private hire	M2, M1	Euro 6 (diesel); Euro 4 (petrol)
Class C	Bus; Coach	M3	Euro VI
Class C	Heavy goods vehicle (HGV)	N2, N3	Euro VI
Class C	Taxi and private hire	M2, M1	Euro 6 (diesel); Euro 4 (petrol)
Class C	Minibus (Note: Gross Vehicle Weight (GVW) less than 5,000 kilograms (5.0 t) and carries 8 or more passengers.)	M2	Euro 6 (diesel); Euro 4 (petrol)
Class C	Light goods vehicle (LGV) (Note: Goods vehicle with a Gross Vehicle Weight (GVW) under 3,500 kilograms (3.5 t).)	N1	Euro 6 (diesel); Euro 4 (petrol)
Class D	Bus; Coach	M3	Euro VI
Class D	Heavy goods vehicle (HGV)	N2, N3	Euro VI
Class D	Minibus	M2	Euro 6 (diesel); Euro 4 (petrol)
Class D	Light goods vehicle (LGV)	N1	Euro 6 (diesel); Euro 4 (petrol)
Class D	Taxi and private hire	M1	Euro 6 (diesel); Euro 4 (petrol)
Class D	Private cars	M1	Euro 6 (diesel); Euro 4 (petrol)
Class D	Motorcycles (optional); Mopeds (optional)	—N/a	Euro 3

==== List of Clean Air Zones ====
===== Operational =====
Region	Type	Date of implementation	Scope	Notes	References
Bath	Class C	15 March 2021	A wide central area	Reduced nitrogen dioxide levels by 26% in 2022/2023, meeting legal standards.	
Birmingham	Class D	1 June 2021	All the roads within but not including the A4540 Ring Road		
Bradford	Class C+	September 2022	The area inside and including the Bradford outer ring road, extending to Shipley and Saltaire.		
Bristol	Class D	28 November 2022	A wide central area extending the North Somerset boundary, including the main route between Wales and Bristol Airport.	Originally planned as class B with additional diesel vehicle ban in parts of city centre between 07:00 and 15:00. Changed to class D due to government rejection.	
Derby	Non-charging	2020	Traffic management measures on Stafford Street		
Newcastle	Class C	July 2022	City centre, including bridges over the River Tyne and bridge approaches across the river in Gateshead		
Nottingham	Non-charging	2020	Retrofitting buses, regulating taxis, converting council-owned vehicles		
Portsmouth	Class B	29 November 2021	City centre area excluding port and naval base		
Sheffield	Class C	27 February 2023	Inner ring road and the city centre		
Southampton	Non-charging	2020	Retrofitting buses, regulating taxis, cleaner fuels and equipment at Southampton's port, cycling infrastructure		

===== Planned or suspended =====
Region	Type	Scope	Notes	References
Greater Manchester	Class B	All local roads in the county	Taxis and private hire vehicles registered within county exempt for first 12 months. Under review.	
Leeds	Class B	City centre	All roads within the boundary of the A61 and A63. Plans postponed in 2020 due to COVID-19 pandemic in England.	
Leicester	Class A		Plans scrapped.	

==== Other emission zones ====
- Greater London has a Low Emission Zone and an Ultra Low Emission Zone, covering the majority of the city
  - In central London there is a Congestion Charge, a different type of charge for motor vehicles
- Oxford has a Zero Emission Zone in the city centre
- Edinburgh, Glasgow, Aberdeen and Dundee each have a Low Emission Zone in their centres

Other LEZ in the UK
Region	Type	Start date	Scope	Notes/references
London	LEZ	2008	Covers HGVs and buses around the Greater London area	
London	ULEZ	2019 (expanded in 2021 and 2023) (Note: the initial ULEZ covered the same area as the congestion charge zone before expanding to cover the areas within (but not including) the A406/A205 in 2021. This was later expanded to cover the same area as the LEZ in 2023)	Covers all other vehicles in the same area as the LEZ	
Oxford	ZEZ	2022	Covers all non-electric vehicles in the city centre. Operational 07:00 to 19:00 including Sundays	(Note: First zero emission zone in the UK)
Glasgow	LEZ	2018 (expanded to cars in 2023)	Covers the city centre	(Note: Unlike other LEZ/CAZ schemes, non-compliant vehicles cannot pay to enter Glasgow's LEZ and will be fined £60.)
