= Optimal Energy Joule =

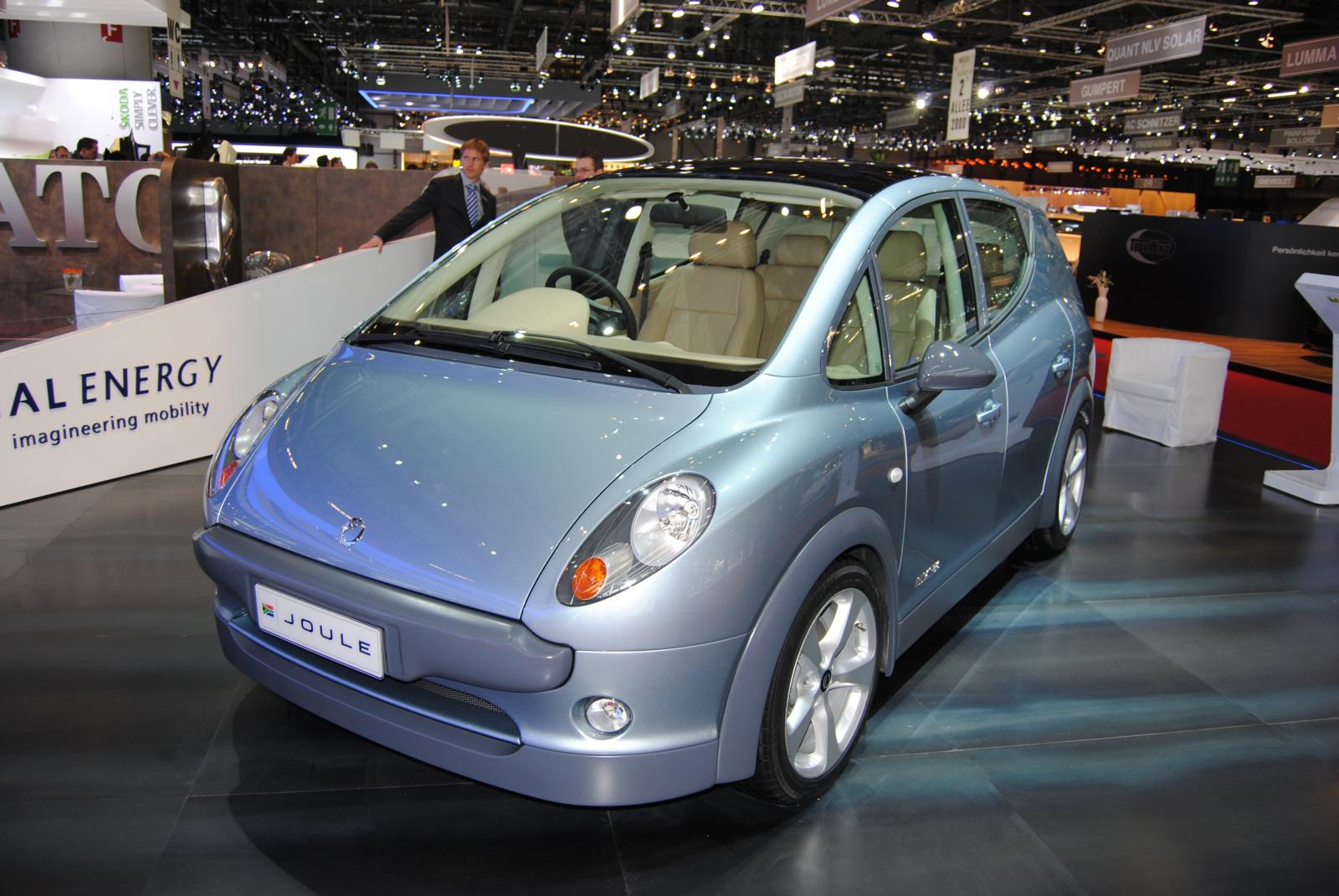

Overview
- Manufacturer: Optimal Energy
- Also called: Joule
- Designer: Keith Helfet

Body and chassis
- Class: Concept car

Dimensions
- Length: 3.8 m (149.6 in)
- Curb weight: 1,200 kg (2,600 lb)

Joule was an electric five seat passenger car by Optimal Energy, a South African company based in Cape Town. According to the company, it was to have a nominal driving range of 150 km and a top speed of 135 km/h. Designed to achieve a Euro NCAP 4 star safety rating, it complied with the stringent EU standards. It was a concept car that was never released commercially; development ceased in April 2012, and in June 2012 Optimal Energy announced its intention to close down.

== Unveiling ==
The Joule was first unveiled to the general public at the 2008 Paris Motor Show on October 2, 2008. It underwent some interior and exterior changes, most notably the change from a six-seater to a 5-seater vehicle, before being revealed to the public at the 2010 Geneva Motor show on 2 March 2010 in a form that was close to the final version.

== Optimal Energy ==
The Joule was the first electric car to be produced by Optimal Energy, the Cape Town based company has been working on the concept since 2004. The design of the car was done by Jaguar car designer Keith Helfet, who is best known for the XJ220, and the F-type concept car. The Joule showed the same 'flowing lines' as his previous designs.

Kobus Meiring, Optimal Energy CEO, suggested that sustainability of the Internal Combustion Engine vehicle has fuelled the increasing need for sustainable vehicle propulsion systems. This, as well as increasing fuel prices and rising country taxes, caused Optimal Energy to embark on the production of a vehicle that could meet these needs.

== Investment to date ==
Funding was primarily through government investments, in particular, the South African Department of Science & Technology (DST) through the Innovation Fund, as well as other private investments. The Innovation Fund invested about US$5 million in the project. The Industrial Development Corporation (IDC) of South Africa is a major shareholder, with 22% of equity in Optimal Energy.

== Class ==
The Joule was classed as a five-seat passenger car.

== Specifications ==
- Length - 3.8 m (150 in)
- Turning Circle - 10.2 m (33 ft)
- Mass - 1,200 kg (2,646 lb)
- Seats - Five
- Boot space - 700 L (25 cu ft)
- Top Speed - Governed at 135 km/h (84 mph)
- Acceleration - 0–60 km/h in less than 5 sec
- Range - 150 km (93 mi)
- Charge time - The battery has a nominal recharge time of 10–12 hours

== Closure ==
A small pilot fleet of Joules was manufactured in conjunction with Hi-Tech Automotive in Port Elizabeth during 2010. The car was expected to be sold in South Africa as well as Europe from 2014, but production ceased in April 2012 after Optimal Energy failed to find a commercial partner. Optimal Energy announced its intention to close down in June 2012.

It was widely reported in the media that the company was bleeding cash, the production date had been pushed back four times, and the proposed sales figures were unrealistic. Optimal Energy required more than R2bn to bring the model to production, by which time it would have been obsolete. With the private sector unwilling to invest, the government declined to commit more taxpayers' money to an enterprise which was not commercially viable.

The pilot Joules were donated to the Nelson Mandela Metropolitan University. It was reported that three were torched in a student protest, and the remaining Joule is in poor condition, with access denied to journalists.

In January 2025, it was revealed that the remaining Joules were intact and not destroyed. Two of the units were sold to a private company, who intend to put one on display and restore another one to operational condition to create awareness of EV's in South Africa.

Two Joules are on display at the James Hall Museum of Transport in Johannesburg.

== See also ==
- Zero-emissions vehicle
- Electric car
