= Sheffield Clean Air Zone =

Vehicle charging zone in Sheffield

- Sheffield Clean Air Zone traffic sign symbol
- Location: Sheffield
- Launched: 27 February 2023
- Technology: Automatic number plate recognition
- Manager: Sheffield City Council
- Currency: Pound sterling
- Retailed: Online
- Website: Clean Air Zone Sheffield

The Sheffield Clean Air Zone (CAZ) is an area of Sheffield city centre where traffic is restricted to reduce air pollution. The Sheffield CAZ covers the area of the city within, and inclusive of, the Sheffield Inner Ring Road. It commenced operation on 27 February 2023 as a Class C Clean Air Zone.

== Implementation ==
The Sheffield Clean Air Zone covers the entirety of the city centre within the Sheffield Inner Ring Road. Most of the inner ring road is included in the CAZ; however, most roundabouts on the inner ring road are not included, to allow vehicles to double back on themselves without entering the zone.

The Sheffield CAZ entered operation on 27 February 2023. It only applies to non-compliant commercial vehicles; private cars are exempt. As of September 2025, the current charges to enter the CAZ are £10 per day for taxis and large vans and £50 per day for buses, coaches and lorries. Exemptions and discounts are available for vehicles such as those partaking in educational school trips, those used for disability transport, or "hard to replace" vehicles such as road construction equipment.

Enforcement of the CAZ is carried out using automatic number plate recognition (ANPR) cameras at all entry points to the zone. It is enforced 24 hours a day, 365 days a year.

== Impact ==
The Sheffield Clean Air Zone raised more than £7.2 million in its first year of operation. In 2025, money raised by the Sheffield CAZ was invested into school road safety schemes across the city, including temporary road closures at school day start and end times outside five schools.
