= Bath Clean Air Zone =

Bath UK vehicle charging zone

- Bath Clean Air Zone traffic sign symbol
- Location: Bath
- Launched: 15 March 2021
- Technology: Fixed and mobile CCTV; Number plate recognition
- Manager: Bath and North East Somerset Council
- Currency: Pound sterling
- Retailed: Online; Telephone; Post
- Website: beta.bathnes.gov.uk/bath-clean-air-zone

Bath Clean Air Zone is an area of central Bath, England where traffic is restricted to reduce air pollution. It became the second Clean Air Zone in the UK (after London) when it was introduced in March 2021. It has been credited with helping to reduce nitrogen dioxide pollution in the city by around a quarter since 2019, and has raised over £7 million in fines. However, critics of the scheme argue that it has displaced traffic to other parts of the city and nearby towns.

== Implementation ==
The Bath Clean Air Zone covers the historic centre of Bath, extending to parts of Walcot, Bathwick, Widcombe, Beechen Cliff, Kingsmead, and the whole of the Royal Victoria Park and Botanical Gardens. It is enforced 24 hours a day, every day of the year, by automatic number-plate recognition (ANPR) cameras installed on roads approaching the zone. Unlike zones in London and Birmingham, which charge almost all drivers of non-exempt vehicles, Bath's is designated as a Class-C Clean Air Zone according to European emission standards: only higher-emission (pre-Euro 6 diesel and pre-Euro 4 petrol) taxis, vans, buses, minibuses, and other commercial vehicles pay to enter the zone, while private cars and motorcycles are exempt, even if they are older, higher-emission vehicles. Electric, hybrid, and fuel cell vehicles are also exempt. Charges range from £9 to £100 per day.

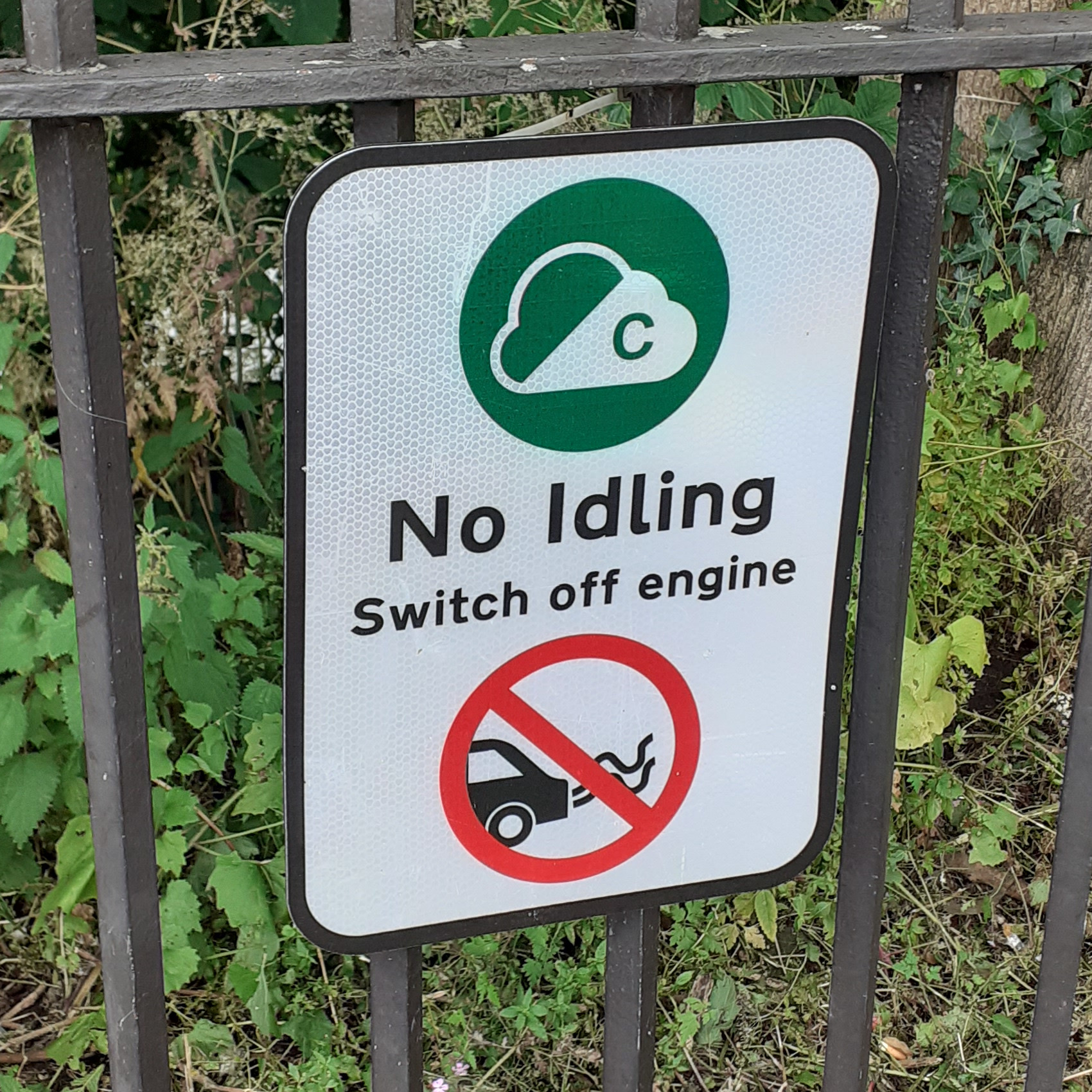
Road signs like this one outside Bath Spa railway station encourage waiting motorists to avoid idling inside the Clean Air Zone.

== History ==
Bath is a World Heritage Site, with many tall, historic tenement buildings ranged along narrow streets. Although much of the central shopping district is pedestrianized, traffic pollution has long been an issue. Citing high levels of nitrogen dioxide, a March 2017 report for the BBC Inside Out West TV news programme claimed "At times Bath's air quality is as bad as Beijing".

Later in 2017, then UK government environment minister Thérèse Coffey directed Bath and North East Somerset Council to produce a clean air plan that would improve Bath's air quality in the shortest possible time; the council announced its plans for a clean air zone in October 2018. According to Robin Kerr of the Federation of Bath Residents' Associations (FOBRA), writing in the Bath Chronicle, the council had been "handed a golden opportunity finally to tackle Bath's transport problems... [and] air pollution... which blights the World Heritage site". Other local people expressed concerns that the scheme would lead to deserted streets with harmful effects on the tourist trade.

Following a six-week public consultation, the council decided it was fairest to implement a scheme that would primarily target large, highly-polluting vehicles (such as commercial vehicles and buses) and exempt all ordinary, private motorists from the charge. The council also announced £9.4 million of financial support, which had by 2023 helped over 1,500 people to replace 938 polluting vehicles. Taxi and van drivers can apply for grants of up to £4,500, while bus, coach, and HGV operators are eligible for up to £35,000 of financial support.

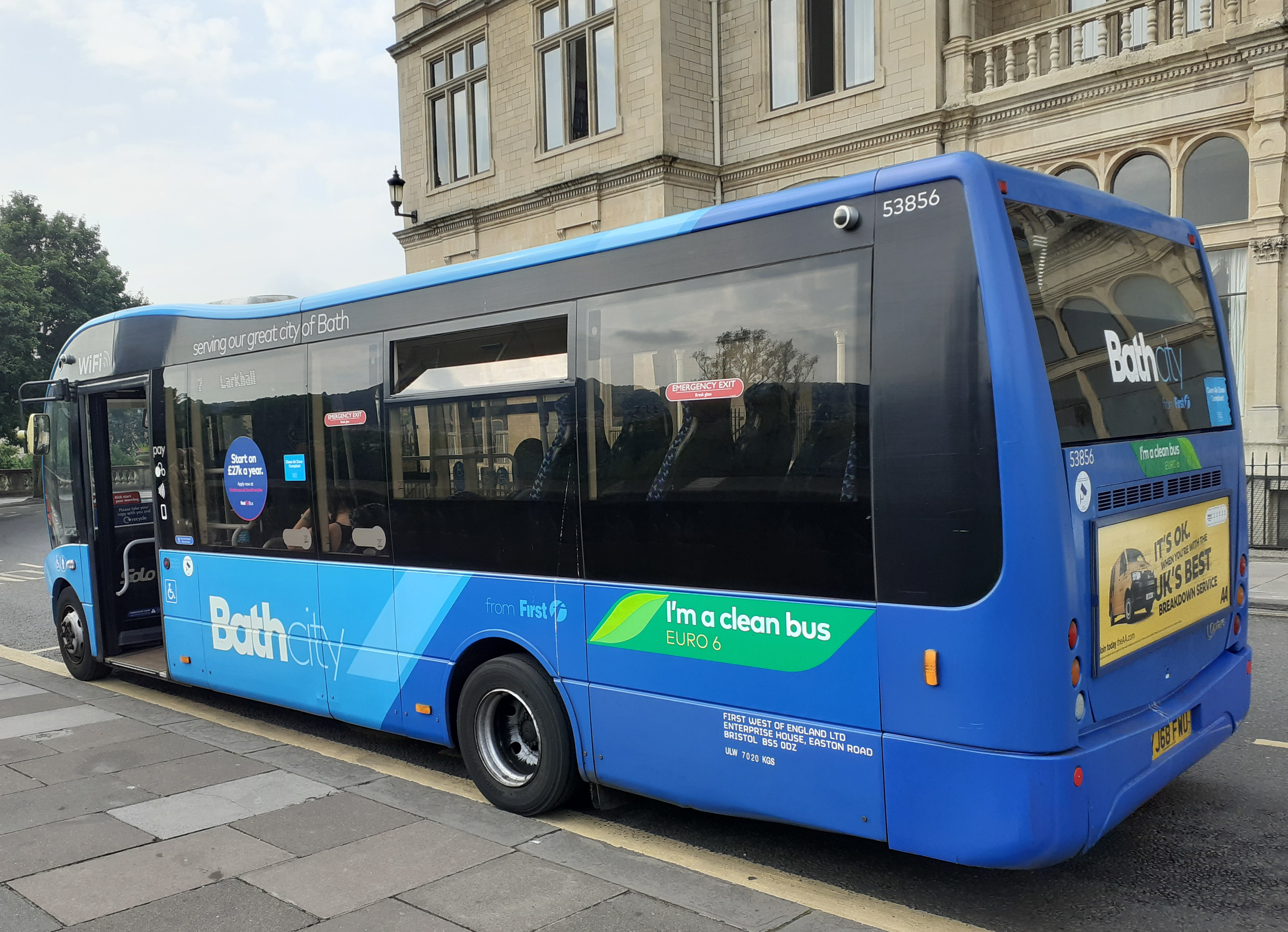
A Euro 6, Clean Air Zone compliant bus parked outside The Empire, inside the Bath Clean Air Zone

Originally scheduled to launch in November 2020, the Bath Clean Air Zone was delayed by the COVID-19 pandemic, and became the first Clean Air Zone outside London when it was finally launched on 15 March 2021.

== Impact ==
In 2021, Bath and North East Somerset Council announced that nitrogen dioxide (NO_{2}) measured at 121 sites in the city (both inside and outside the clean air zone) had fallen by an average of 22 percent. In 2023, Bath's Clean Air Zone became the first in the UK to pass a "State 3 assessment" by the UK government's Joint Air Quality Unit, a technical milestone that means nitrogen dioxide levels have fallen to and remained inside guideline levels. There was some uncertainty over how much of this was attributable to COVID-19 restrictions and the closure of the city's historic Cleveland Bridge for maintenance. Some parts of the city, including its most polluted street, Chapel Row, experienced a significant increase in NO_{2} in the months after the scheme opened. In 2022, the Council reported an average 26 percent reduction in NO_{2} compared with 2019, noting that the number of polluting vehicles entering the zone had fallen by 71 percent between the scheme's inception in March 2021 and December 2022.

Some 30,000–40,000 vehicles enter the Clean Air Zone each day, of which fewer than 5 percent are non-compliant; following the introduction of the scheme, some 28,000 motorists were fined in the first 100 days. Efforts to collect fines from drivers were initially mixed; after the first three months, the council revealed that only two-thirds of those fined were paying promptly, within seven days. Between March 2021 and December 2023, over 174,000 fines were issued to drivers who entered the zone in non-exempt vehicles, raising a total of £7,102,980. According to the council, this money has been "reinvested back into Bath and North East Somerset to support further improvements to air quality and sustainable transport".

Critics of the scheme have argued that it has caused an increase in traffic congestion elsewhere in the city and in parts of neighbouring Wiltshire, notably on the A36, A363, B3105, A361 and A350. Wiltshire Council's research suggests the scheme, coupled with lengthy closure of the Cleveland Bridge, increased HGV traffic through Westbury by 20 percent. Shortly after the Bath scheme was launched, Wiltshire Council requested air quality monitoring of Bradford-on-Avon and Westbury to assess its wider, potentially negative impacts on West Wiltshire, but the request was turned down by the Department for Environment, Food, and Rural Affairs.
