= Bradford Institute for Health Research =

Research organization in England

The Bradford Institute for Health Research (BIHR) is a health research organization based at Bradford Royal Infirmary in Bradford, England. Established in 2007, it operates as a partnership between local NHS trusts and academic institutions, including the University of Bradford, University of Leeds, and University of York.

== History ==
Founded in 2007 by epidemiologist John Wright, it is headquartered at Temple Bank House on the Bradford Royal Infirmary campus. The institute emphasizes community-engaged research, particularly within Bradford’s ethnically diverse population.

== Research focus ==
BIHR conducts studies on health determinants across the lifespan, with key themes including child development, chronic disease management, and patient safety. It collaborates with the National Institute for Health and Care Research (NIHR) and hosts the NIHR Applied Research Collaboration for Yorkshire and Humber.

== Major Programs and Collaborations ==
=== Born in Bradford ===
Born in Bradford (BiB) is a longitudinal birth cohort study tracking over 30,000 children since 2007. It examines factors influencing health outcomes, such as air pollution, nutrition, and genetics. Findings have informed public health policies, including interventions targeting childhood obesity and air quality.

=== NIHR Patient Safety Research Collaboration ===
This center, funded by the NIHR, focuses on reducing medical errors and improving care safety. Key projects include tools to reduce diagnostic delays and support healthcare workers involved in errors.

=== Wolfson Centre for Applied Health Research ===
Established in 2019 with a £1 million grant from the Wolfson Foundation, this center facilitates collaboration between clinicians and researchers. It focuses on healthy aging, childhood development, and patient safety.

=== Connected Bradford ===
A data linkage initiative integrating health, social care, and environmental records for over 1 million residents. It supports research on population health trends and service evaluation.
