= Ultra Low Emission Zone =

London UK vehicle charging zone

- The combined Low Emission Zone and Ultra Low Emission Zone symbol seen on road signs
- Location: Greater London
- Launched: 8 April 2019; 7 years ago
- Technology: Fixed and mobile CCTV; Number plate recognition
- Operator: Capita
- Manager: Transport for London
- Currency: Pound sterling
- Retailed: Online; Telephone; Post
- Website: tfl.gov.uk/modes/driving/ultra-low-emission-zone

Boundary of the ULEZ From 2023 2021–2023 Congestion zone

The Ultra Low Emission Zone (ULEZ) is an area in London, England, where an emissions standard based charge is applied to non-compliant road vehicles. Plans were announced by London Mayor Boris Johnson in 2015 for the zone to come into operation in 2020. Sadiq Khan, the subsequent mayor, introduced the zone early in 2019. The zone initially covered Central London, the same area as the existing London congestion charge; in 2021, Khan extended the zone to cover the area within the North Circular and South Circular roads. In 2023 it was further extended to all of Greater London, covering over 1,500 square kilometres (580 sq mi) and approximately 9 million people.

The zone has reduced the number of non-compliant cars on the road and has averted an amount of toxic air pollution equivalent to that emitted by London's airports combined. The zone raised £224 million in 2022.

The scheme, particularly its expansion to the Greater London boundary in 2023, has proven controversial, with opponents, including many Conservatives, criticising the cost incurred by drivers of polluting vehicles.

== History ==
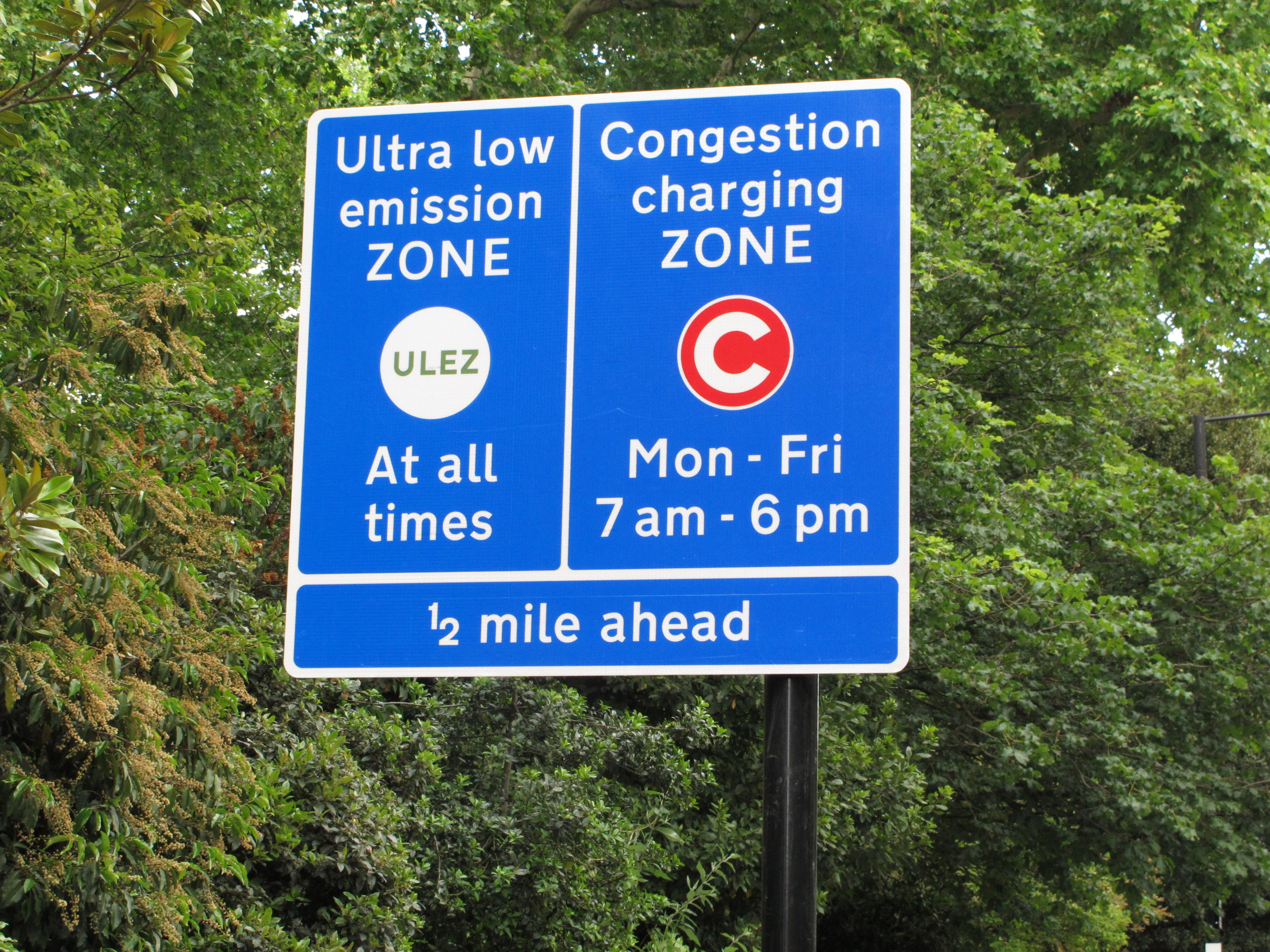
Advance warning sign about the Ultra Low Emission Zone and Congestion Charging Zone (2019–2021)

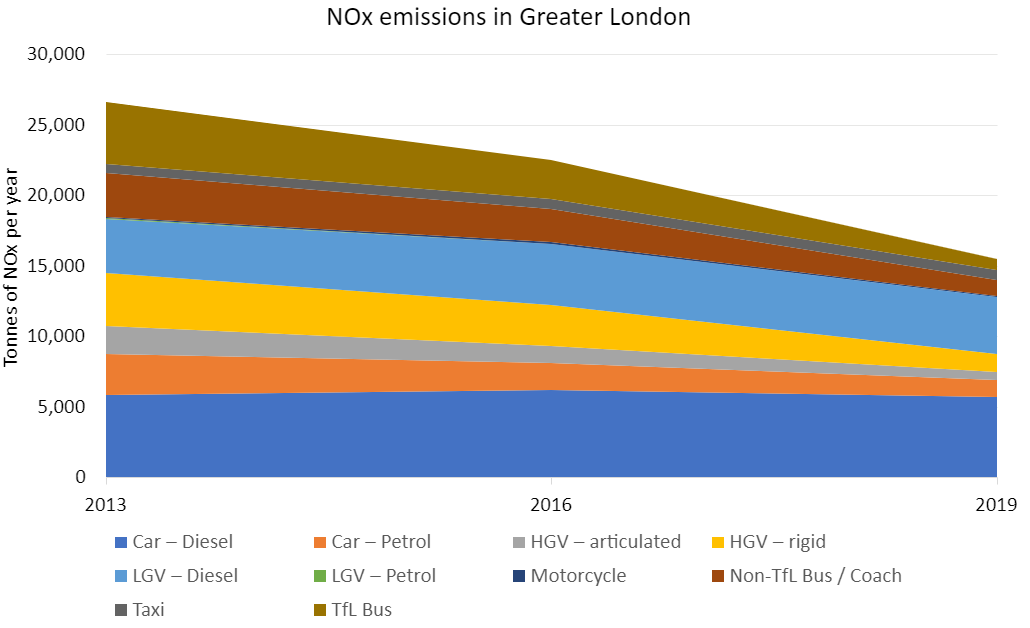
NO_{x} emissions from road transport in Greater London (GLA boundary) from 2013 to 2019

=== 2019 central zone ===
Plans for an ultra–low emission zone were under consideration since 2014 under London Mayor Boris Johnson. Johnson announced in 2015 that the zone covering the same areas as the Central London congestion charge would come into operation in September 2020. Sadiq Khan, Johnson's successor, introduced an emissions surcharge, called the Toxicity Charge or "T-Charge", for non-compliant vehicles from 2017. The Toxicity Charge was replaced by the Ultra Low Emission Zone on 8 April 2019, which was introduced ahead of schedule.

=== 2021 inner expansion ===
The zone was expanded to cover the Inner London area inside the North Circular and South Circular roads on 25 October 2021 so that it covers an area containing 3.8 million people. Around a million vehicles a day drive in the expanded zone, but Transport for London (TfL) estimated that 87% were already compliant with the emissions rules, meaning nearly 140,000 vehicles would have to be replaced or pay the charge, including 100,000 cars, 35,000 vans, and 3,000 heavy goods vehicles.

A month into the expansion, TfL said that the proportion of compliant vehicles had risen from 87% to 92%, and the number of non-compliant vehicles had fallen by over a third (from 127,000 to 80,000 on weekdays). They also said that 94% of cars complied compared to 78% of vans. Six months after the expansion, TfL estimated that NO_{x} in Inner London was 20% lower than it would have been without the expansion and found that 95% of cars and 83% of vans now met the standard.

=== 2023 outer expansion ===
The ULEZ was expanded on 29 August 2023 to cover all 32 London boroughs, bringing an additional five million people into the zone. The new outer boundary coincides with the London low emission zone. It covers most of Greater London, with minor deviations to allow diversionary routes and facilities to turn around without entering the zone.

In March 2022, TfL estimated that 20,000 to 40,000 vehicles would be taken off the road due to the expansion. Khan said: "This is also a matter of social justice – with air pollution hitting the poorest communities the hardest. Nearly half of Londoners don't own a car, but they are disproportionally feeling the damaging consequences polluting vehicles are causing."

The extended zone covers over 1,500 km^{2} (580 sq mi) and approximately 9 million people.

== Operation ==
Road sign used since the 2023 expansion of the zone

=== Charging ===
The £12.50 charge applies 24 hours a day every day of the year except Christmas Day (25 December). The criteria for charging is based on European emission standards:

- Motorcycles that do not meet Euro 3 standards (most vehicles pre-2007)
- Petrol cars and vans that do not meet Euro 4 standards (most vehicles pre-2006)
- Diesel cars and vans that do not meet Euro 6 standards (most vehicles pre-2015)

Buses, coaches, and heavy goods vehicles must meet or exceed the Euro VI standard or pay £100 per day as part of the separate London low emission zone. Drivers entering central London who have paid for ULEZ are still subject to the London congestion charge.

The money raised from the ULEZ is invested in the transport network and other measures to reduce air pollution in London. In 2022 the zone raised £224m in charges and fines. The income from ULEZ declined from month to month in 2022 as more vehicles entering the zone became compliant with emissions standards.

=== Exemptions ===
Vehicles in the "disabled" tax class are exempt from the charge, as are London-licensed taxis, private hire vehicles which are wheelchair accessible, and historic vehicles (over 40 years old). There are also exemptions for agricultural vehicles, military vehicles, certain types of mobile cranes and non-road going vehicles which are allowed to drive on the highway (e.g. excavators). Residents of the zone did not pay the charge until October 2021, provided they were registered for the residents' Congestion Charge discount and met the T-Charge standards.

=== Scrappage scheme ===
There was a scrappage scheme to help those on income support or disability benefit to get rid of their old vehicle. This was used to scrap at least 12,000 vehicles. The original scheme offered up to £7,000 compensation for a car or van which had been operating in the congestion zone, plus up to £2,500 if this was replaced by an electric vehicle.

When ULEZ was expanded beyond the congestion charge zone, the compensation was reduced to £2,000 for cars with a limit for the number of vans and initially £15,000 for heavy vehicles. The Mayor said on 14 October 2021 that there was less than £2 million left in the £61 million fund. This paid out over £61 million by 2022.

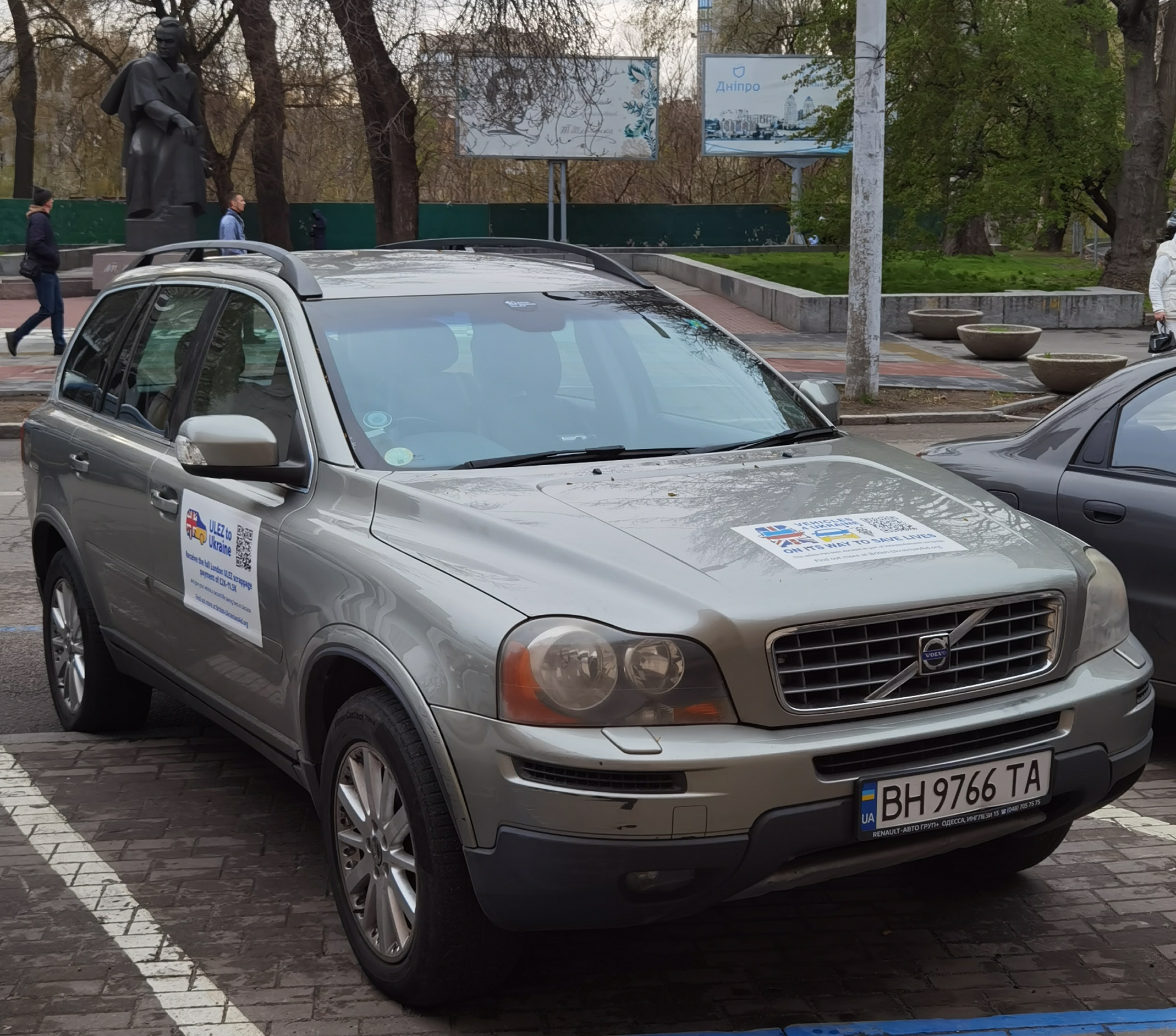
Car bought under "ULEZ to Ukraine" initiative in Dnipro, Ukraine

The rates for the scrappage scheme from 4 August 2023 were announced at the end of July 2023. Receipt of child benefit was added to the criteria for eligibility. £2,000 is offered for scrapping a car and £1,000 for a motorcycle. £5,000 is offered for wheelchair accessible vehicles to scrap or retrofit to make compliant. Part of the scrappage payment can be converted to an annual bus and tram pass. Grant payments of between £5,000 and £9,500 are available for scrappage or retrofit of vans and minibuses used by small businesses, sole traders and charities. The scheme was later widened to all Londoners and small businesses able to scrap up to three vans instead of one, taking effect from 21 August 2023.

Since 2024, cars subject to ULEZ rules can be donated to Ukraine instead of being scrapped.

== Effects ==
=== Air pollution ===
In November 2021, a study from the Centre for Transport Studies in Imperial College London found the ULEZ caused smaller reductions in air pollution emissions than had been reported. It stated that there has been a longer-term downward trend in London's air pollution levels and argued that the ULEZ on its own is not an effective strategy. The Greater London Authority had been funding other work at the College since July 2020, including the Environmental Research Group. Freedom of Information requests published in August 2023 showed Shirley Rodrigues, the leader of the City Hall Conservatives and Deputy Mayor for Environment and Energy, and Frank Kelly, Director of the Environmental Research Group, corresponded in November 2021 about mitigating the impact of the research.

Further research found that ULEZ has significantly reduced air pollution: a pair of 2022 studies found that within the first year of the zone's establishment, nitrogen dioxide levels had been reduced by 12% compared with the previous year, with reductions already evident within the first 90 days. Between 2019 and 2022, the amount of nitrogen oxide emissions in London dropped by 13,500 tonnes, which was equivalent to all emissions from landings and takeoffs at Heathrow Airport and London City Airport during the same period.

A 2025 report from Transport for London and the Greater London Authority found that, in 2024, nitrogen dioxide levels were 27 per cent lower across the city than they would have been without ULEZ and its expansion, with a drop of 54 per cent in central London. Particulate matter exhaust emissions from cars and vans were estimated to be 31 per cent lower in Outer London as a result of the zone's expansion. Figures published in 2025 by the Department for Environment, Food and Rural Affairs revealed that London had met the legal limit for nitrogen dioxide in 2024. It was previously estimated in 2019 by King's College London that it would take 193 years to meet the legal limit.

A study published in The Lancet Public Health in 2026 compared the lung size and function of about 1,600 children aged six to nine in London primary schools with a matched group of 1,600 in Luton. In 2019, London children had significantly smaller lungs on average than those in Luton, but by 2022 they were similar. The number with clinically impaired lung function fell from 14% to 9% in London, compared with a smaller decline from 9% to 7% in Luton.

=== Hospital Admissions ===
In 2026, a peer-reviewed study by researchers at Imperial College London examined emergency hospital admissions among adults living within the original central London ULEZ and its predecessor, the Toxicity Charge (T-charge), between 2014 and 2020. The study found that annual hospital admission rates for cardiovascular disease were estimated to have fallen by 9.3%, while all-cause emergency admissions fell by 5.1%. The authors concluded that the T-charge and central London ULEZ were associated with improved public health outcomes, although the short period between the introduction of the ULEZ and the onset of the COVID-19 pandemic limited the ability to distinguish the effects of the ULEZ from those of the earlier T-charge.

=== Vehicle numbers ===
The number of non-compliant vehicles entering the zone each day dropped from 35,578, in March 2019, to 26,195 in April of the same year, after the charge was introduced. The number further dropped to 23,054 in July 2019. The proportion of vehicles which complied with the standards rose from 61% in March 2019 to 74% in September 2019. It further rose to 85% in December 2020, including 90% for cars, and the number of non-compliant vehicles dropped to around 12,000 (of which 4,000 were exempt from the charges).

The total number of vehicles entering Central London each day also dropped from over 102,000 in February 2017 to 89,000 in April 2019.

In Outer London, the percentage of compliant vehicles rose from 85% in May 2022 when the consultation for expansion was announced, to 90.9% in June 2023 and further jumped to 95.2% in September 2023 following the beginning of charging.

An April 2024 report stated that diesel sales in London were declining significantly faster than in other areas of the country, with a decline of roughly 40% over four years.

=== Politics ===
The planned expansion of ULEZ into outer London was cited as the reason for the Conservatives' Steve Tuckwell's victory over Labour's Danny Beales in the 2023 Uxbridge and South Ruislip by-election, despite substantial swings against the Conservatives in all three by-elections held the same day.

=== Motorists ===
Only one in 200 London residents have been affected by the ULEZ expansion, according to a Freedom of Information request filed by BBC London eight months after the expansion.

== Reaction ==
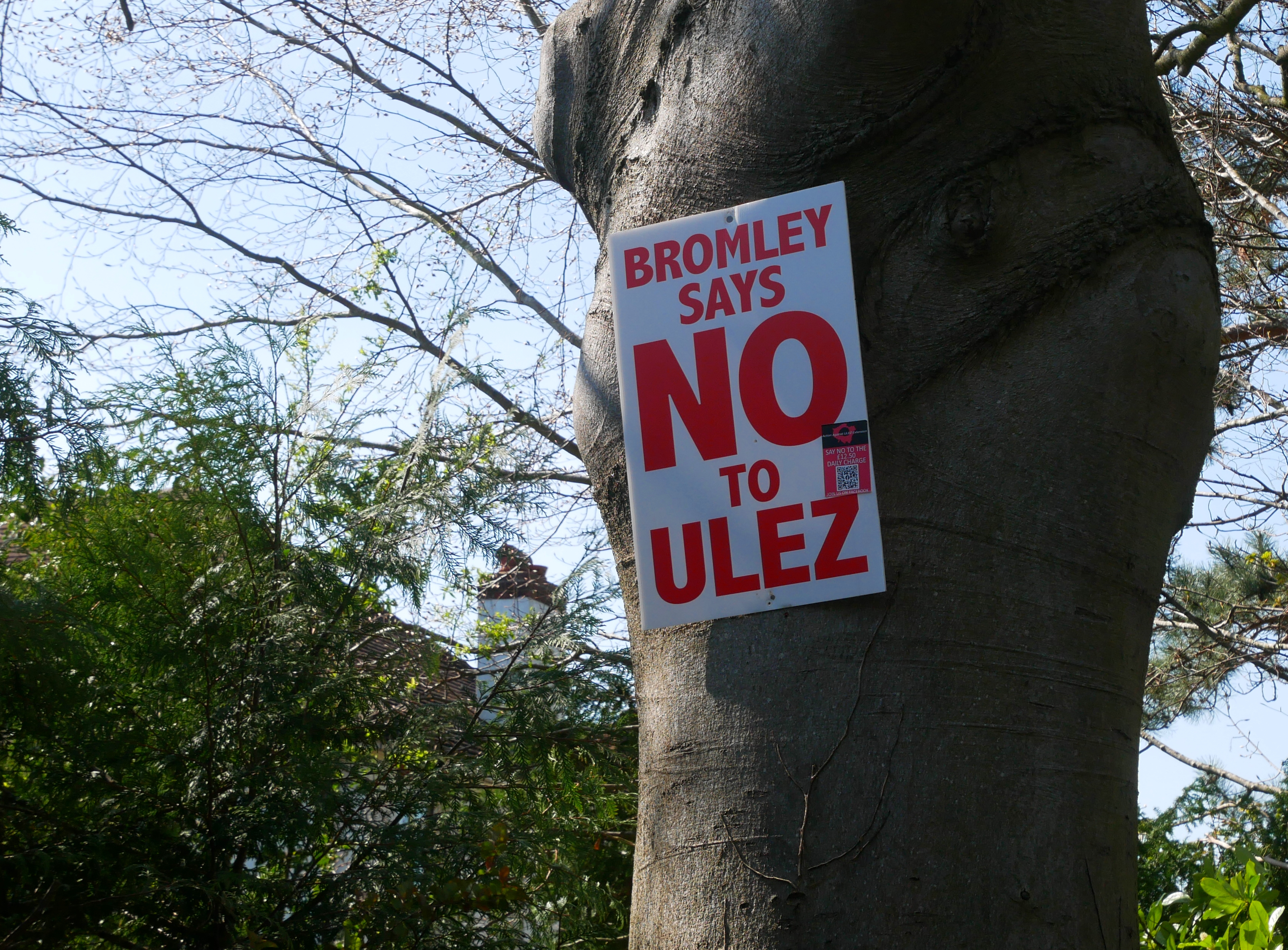
A poster in Orpington, southeast London, expressing opposition to the 2023 expansion of the ULEZ to cover Outer London

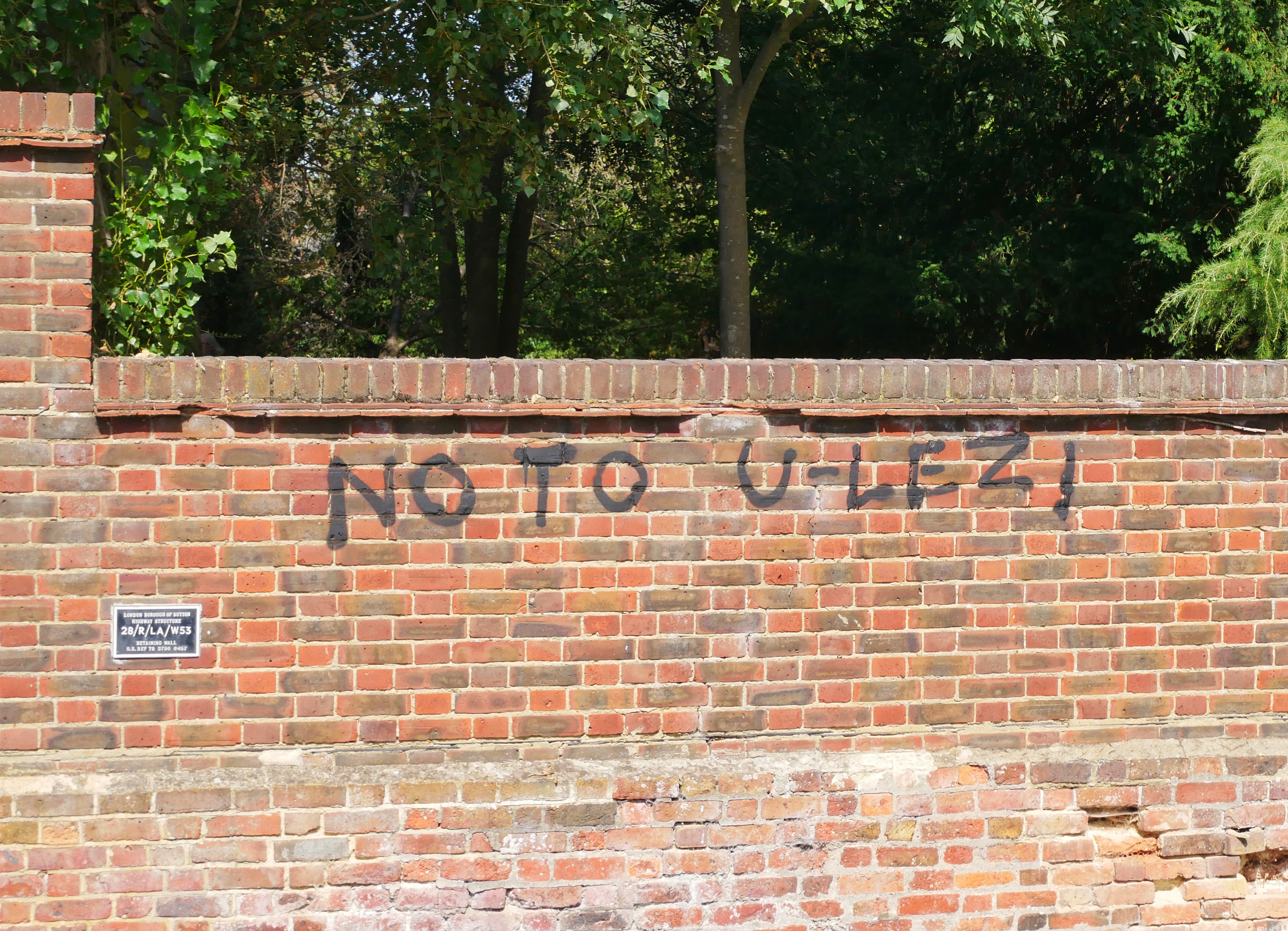
Graffiti in Carshalton, southwest London, expressing opposition to the 2023 expansion of the ULEZ to cover Outer London

Writing in 2019, the BBC's transport correspondent Tom Edwards described the Ultra Low Emission Zone as "one of the most radical anti-pollution policies in the world". A poll in April 2019 by YouGov found that 72% of Londoners supported using emissions charging to tackle both air pollution and congestion. However, the Federation of Small Businesses said that many small firms were "very worried about the future of their businesses" as a result of the "additional cost burden".

Ross Clark, writing in The Spectator, argued in 2022 the expansion would disproportionately impact poorer Londoners, who were more likely to own an older, non-compliant vehicle that would be subject to the daily charge. TfL found that 60% of those who responded to its public consultation into the expansion plans were opposed, as well as 70% of outer London residents and 80% of outer London workers.

Polling in July 2023 showed a plurality of London residents said they supported the expansion of the ULEZ in London, with residents in Outer London evenly split.

=== Failed High Court challenge ===
In May 2023, a coalition of Bexley Council, Bromley Council, Harrow Council and Hillingdon Council in Greater London with neighbouring Surrey County Council, all Conservative-led, received permission from the High Court for a legal challenge to the August 2023 expansion into outer London. The permitted grounds for the claim were "failure to comply with relevant statutory requirements" and "unfair and unlawful consultation". Two further grounds concerned the scrappage scheme, "whether the mayor properly considered the previous "buffer zone" approach as a material consideration" and "irrationality due to uncertainty and inadequate consultation". The hearing began on 4 July and the case was decided on 28 July 2023, when the court found the outer expansion to be lawful.

=== Vandalism ===
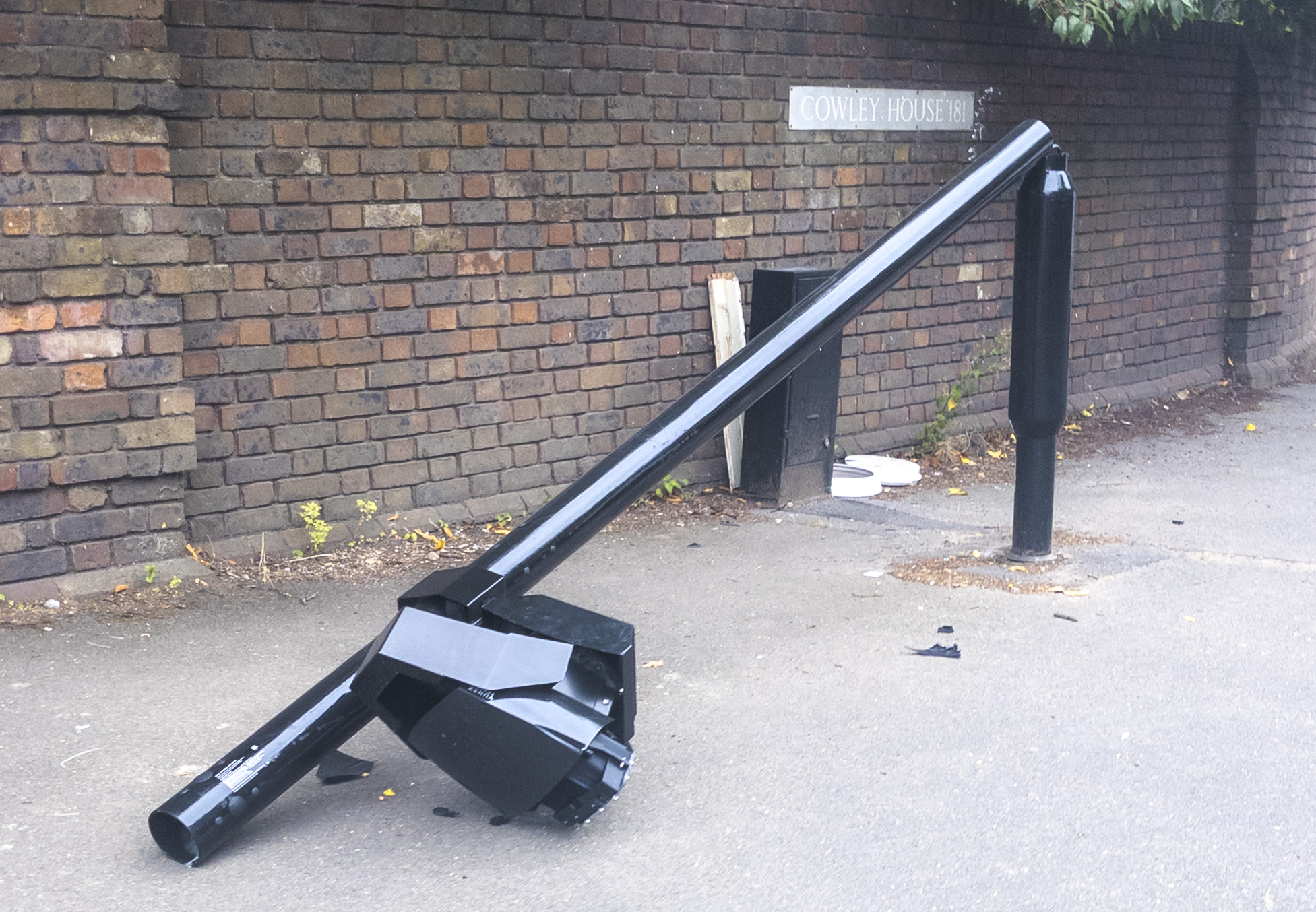
A destroyed ULEZ camera in Uxbridge

Since 2023, the cameras that enforce ULEZ have come under a campaign of organised vandalism by people who oppose it. The group, calling themselves "Blade Runners", told the Daily Mail they intend to destroy all ULEZ cameras. Speaking to Julia Hartley-Brewer on TalkTV, a man claiming to be the campaign director of the group and identifying himself as "Captain Gatso", described the group's activity as "unpaid voluntary work for the community" taking "defensive offensive action" against present and past governments. By September 2023, attacks on cameras had extended to slashing tyres and spraying graffiti onto camera vans.

At the start of August 2023, the Metropolitan Police launched "Operation Eremon" to coordinate investigations into the vandalism. By 30 August 288 crimes relating to ULEZ cameras had been reported, and two arrests made. On 22 September 2023, a further arrest was made. On 4 October 2023, it was reported that Laurence Fox had been arrested by police on suspicion of conspiring to commit criminal damage to ULEZ cameras.

In December 2023, a man used a homemade explosive device to destroy a ULEZ camera in Sidcup, also damaging surrounding vehicles and properties. He was convicted of causing an explosion likely to endanger life or cause serious injury to property in 2026.

=== Registration protests ===
Shortly after the expansion of the scheme was announced, a number of protestors registered their car under Khan's name with the intent of making him liable for charges. In September 2026, Khan was convicted in his absence under the single justice procedure for failing to tax a Nissan Micra registered in his name and was fined. The bill had been erroneously sent to a nearby Gordon Ramsay restaurant so Khan was unaware of it. A day later, the conviction was withdrawn after the DVLA applied to the Magistrates Court. The DVLA stated they were investigating the false vehicle registration.

== See also ==
- Clean Air Zone – Air quality improvement measures in a city
- London low emission zone – Traffic air pollution charge scheme
- Low-emission zone – Area established to improve air quality
- London congestion charge – Fee for vehicles entering Central London
- Oxford zero emission zone – Charging zone for non-electric vehicles
