= Oxford zero emission zone =

Charging zone for non-electric vehicles

- A zero emission zone shown on road signs (displays 'ZEZ')
- Location: Oxford City Centre
- Launched: 28 February 2022; 3 years ago
- Technology: Fixed and mobile CCTV; Automatic number plate recognition
- Manager: Oxford City Council; Oxfordshire County Council
- Currency: Pound sterling
- Retailed: Online; Telephone; Post
- Website: Official website

The Oxford zero emission zone is the first zero emission zone (ZEZ) in the United Kingdom. Launched on 28 February 2022, the scheme covers nine streets in the city centre of Oxford. All non-electric vehicles (including hybrids) driving on these roads between 7 am to 7 pm are subject to a fee between £2 and £10, which is expected to double in 2025.

== History ==
In 2017, a £30,000 joint study was launched by Oxfordshire County Council and Oxford City Council to determine whether a zero emission zone would be a useful way to reduce air pollution in the city centre and along the main transport routes. The city had already been a low-emission zone since 2014, which applied to buses, since buses accounted for up to 80% of the pollution in the city centre. At the time of the original study, Oxford was slated to become the UK's second city LEZ after London introduced one in 2008. Subsequently, managed clean air zones have been introduced in several other cities, including Bath, Bristol and Tyneside.

== Implementation ==
A consultation was put in place in 2020, with the hope of launching the ZEZ in December. Due to the COVID-19 pandemic, this was delayed. The scheme was approved by both councils in March 2021, and was launched for nine streets on 28 February 2022 as a pilot program. Oxford's ZEZ was the first of its kind in the UK.

== Operation ==
Unlike other low emission schemes in the United Kingdom, which operate 24/7, the Oxford ZEZ is in operation from 7 am to 7 pm daily, and applies to all non-electric vehicles, including hybrids. The charges for petrol, diesel and hybrid vehicles range from £2 to £10, with the most polluting vehicles charged more. However, as of 2024, these fees remain lower than London's £12.50 Ultra Low Emissions charge.

The initial proposals could more accurately be described as a "congestion charge", as any vehicle can enter on payment of a charge but this will change in the future. The ambition for the scheme is that it will gradually expand to cover most of Oxford by 2035. This plan means that Oxford could become the world's first transport-carbon emission-free city. The fees are expected to double in August 2025.
