= Alternatives to car use =

Transport modes other than cars or trucks

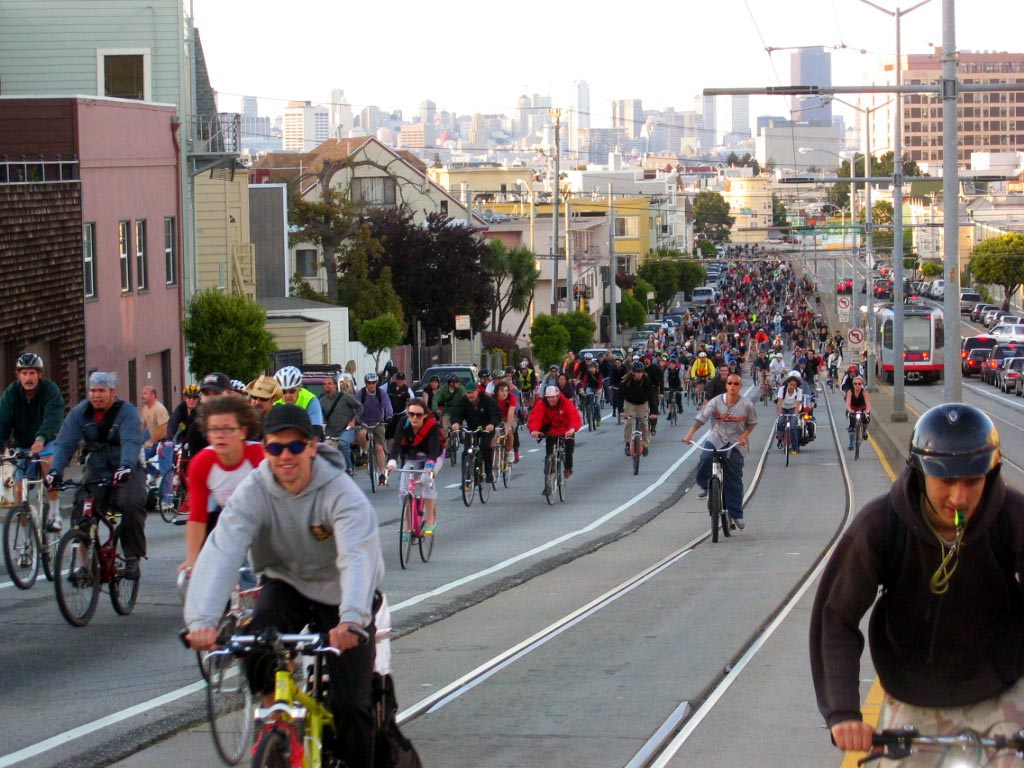
Critical Mass, San Francisco, April 29, 2005 and Muni Metro tram on J Church line

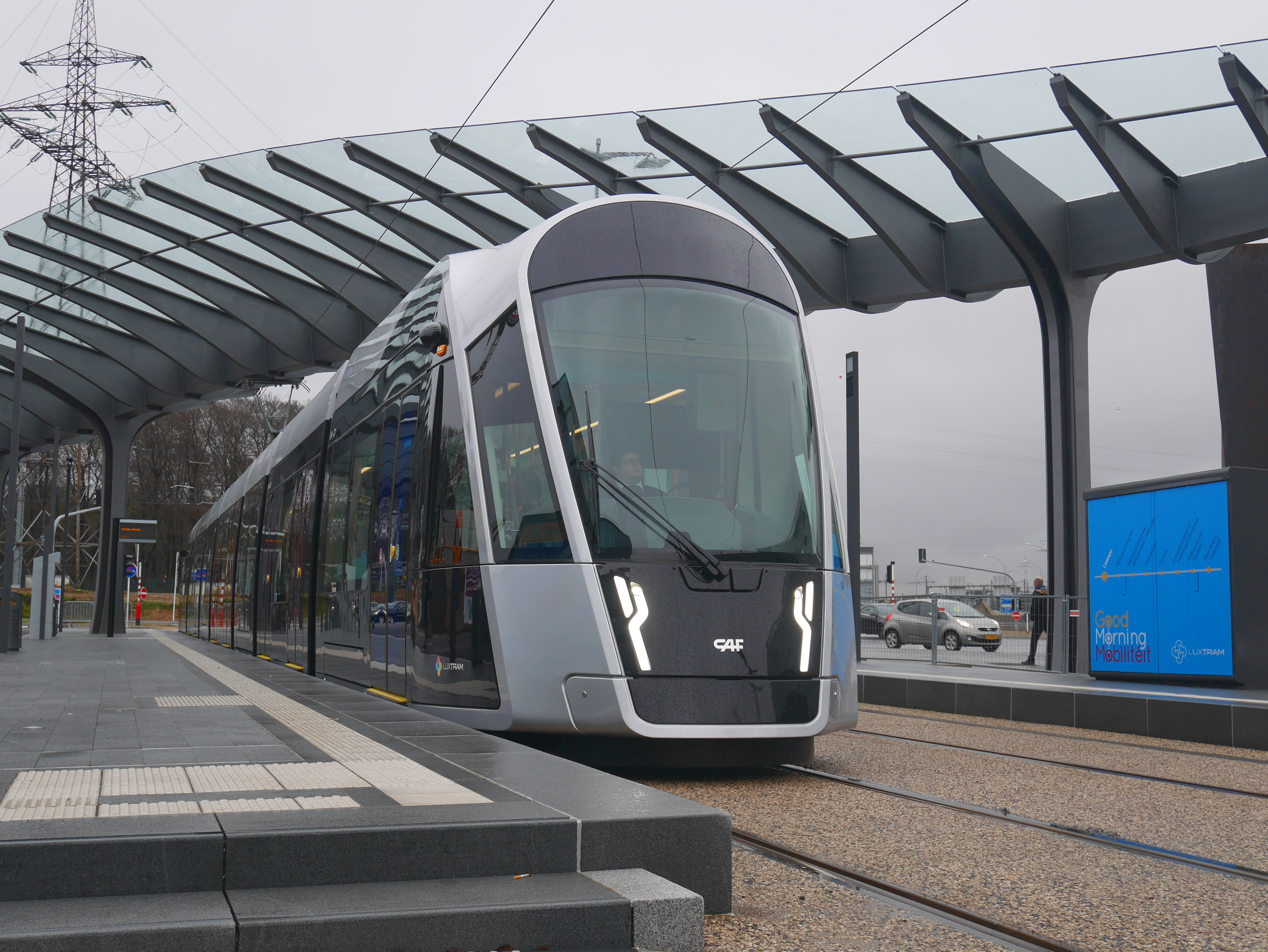
A tram in Luxembourg in 2018

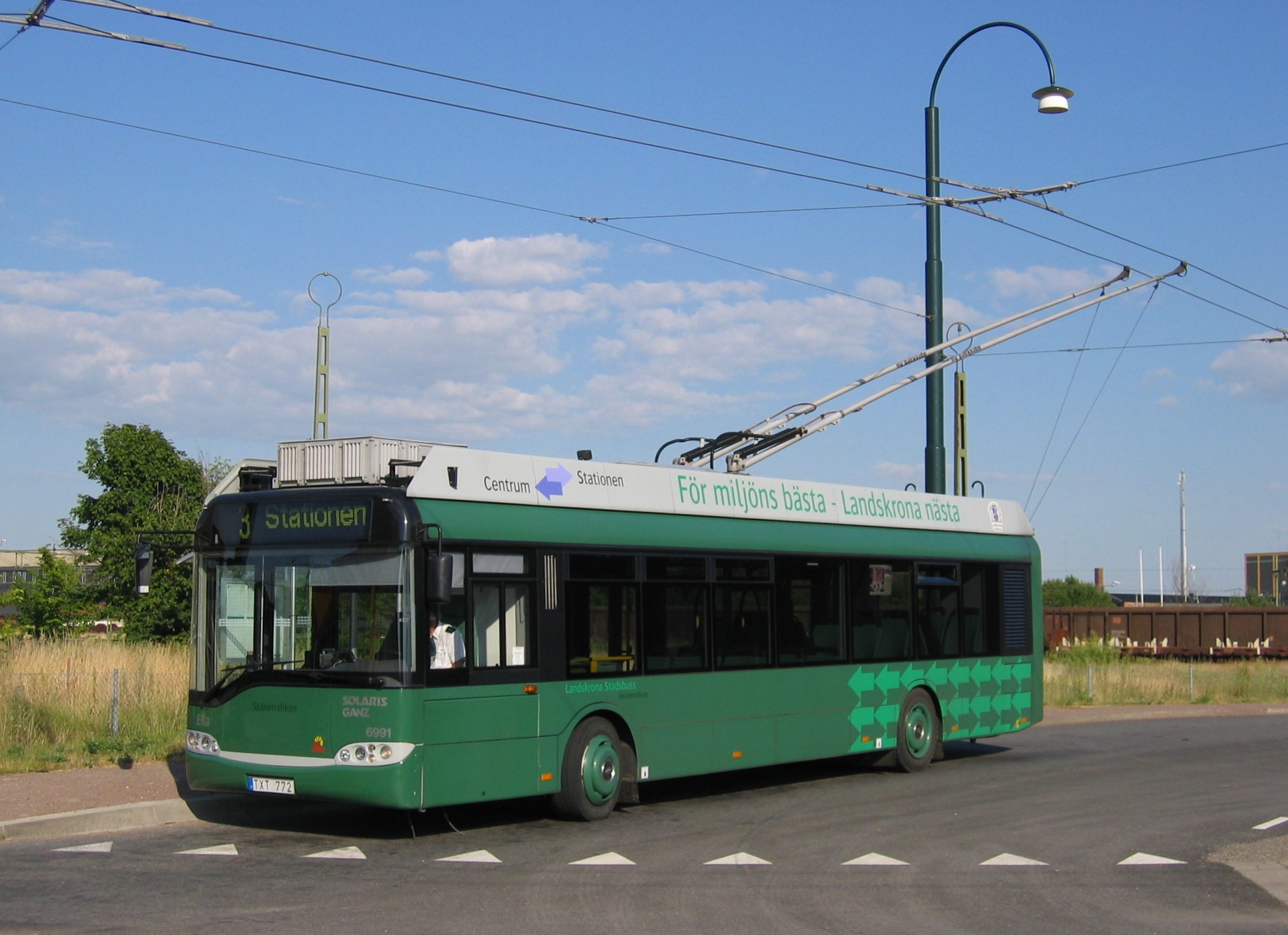
Solaris trolleybus in Landskrona, Sweden

Established alternatives to car use are usually used to refer to transportation options that can improve health through increased physical activity, reduced pollution, less resource use and emissions, reduced congestion, less wasted time and money, as well as creating more livable and equitable communities by fostering social inclusion and reallocating space from parking and roads to other uses. Common alternatives include cycling, walking, kick scooters, rollerblading, skateboarding, twikes and (electric or internal combustion) motorcycles. Other alternatives are public transport vehicles (buses, guided buses, trolleybuses, trains, subways, monorails, tramways).

== History ==
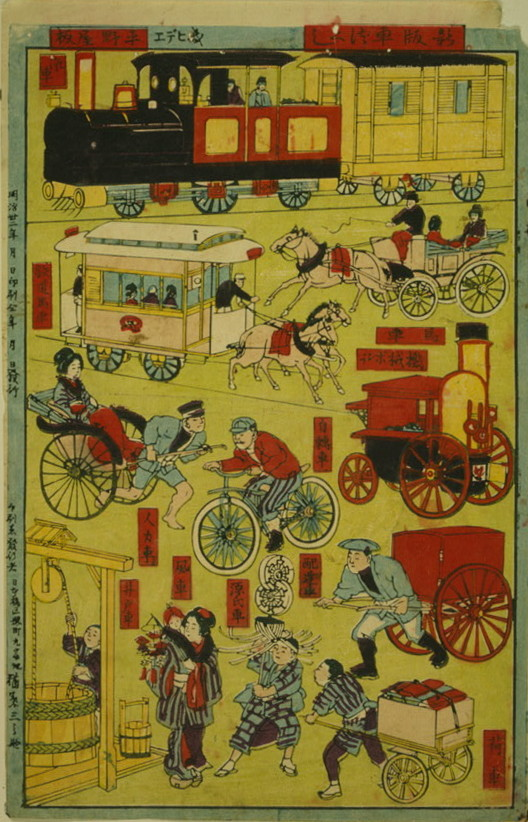
An 1889 Japanese print shows various forms of transportation

Prior to the popularity of car use which dominated motorised transport (and consequently urban planning) from around the 1950s onwards, several transportation modes were used. Pedestrianism for both short and long distances was used, but also travel by horse especially for long distances. Trams, especially powered trams, achieved widespread popularity in the 19th century. Carriages, used for centuries, are still used but mainly for tourism.

== Public transport ==
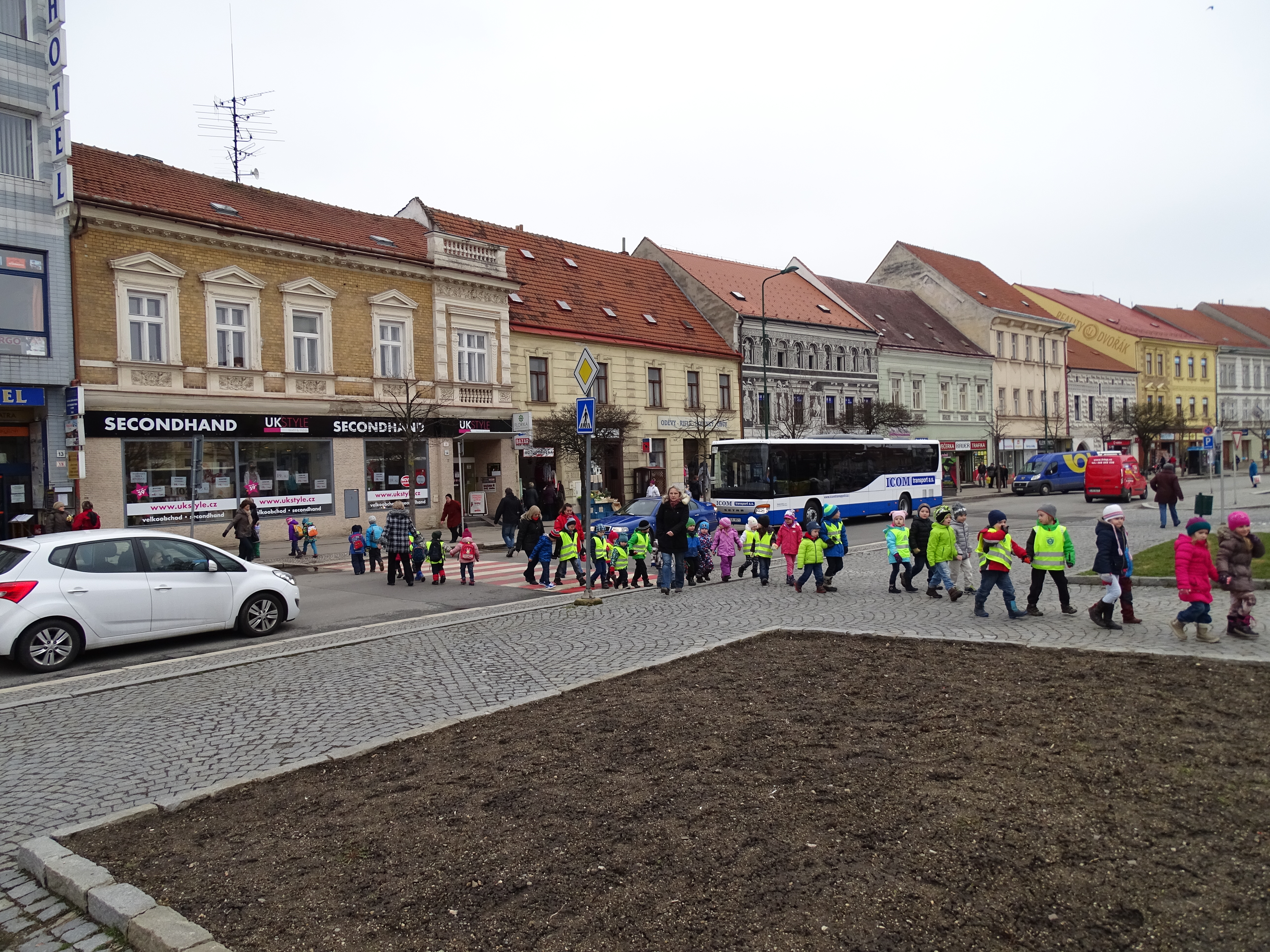
Walking bus, Třebíč-Vnitřní Město, Třebíč District, Vysočina Region, Czechia, Karlovo náměstí

The public transport with the highest modal share worldwide is travelling by bus followed by travelling by rail due to infrastructure cost. A pedestrian form of public transport is a walking bus predominantly used by schools. An attempt to transform private transport by bicycle into public transport has been bicycle sharing schemes. Effectively they are renting access to a fleet. Bicycle-sharing systems have been implemented in over 1000 cities worldwide, and are especially common in many European and Chinese cities of all sizes. Similar programs have been implemented across the United States as well, including large cities like Washington, D.C., and New York City, as well as smaller cities like Buffalo, New York and Fort Collins, Colorado.

Personal rapid transit is a scheme that has been discussed, in which small, automated vehicles would run on special elevated tracks spaced within walking distance throughout a city, and could provide direct service to a chosen station without stops. However, despite several concepts existing for decades personal rapid transit has failed to gain significant ground and several prototypes and experimental systems have been dismantled as failures.

== Private transport ==
=== Unmotorised ===
The private transport with the highest modal share, worldwide that is unmotorised, is pedestrianism followed by cycling.

=== Motorised ===
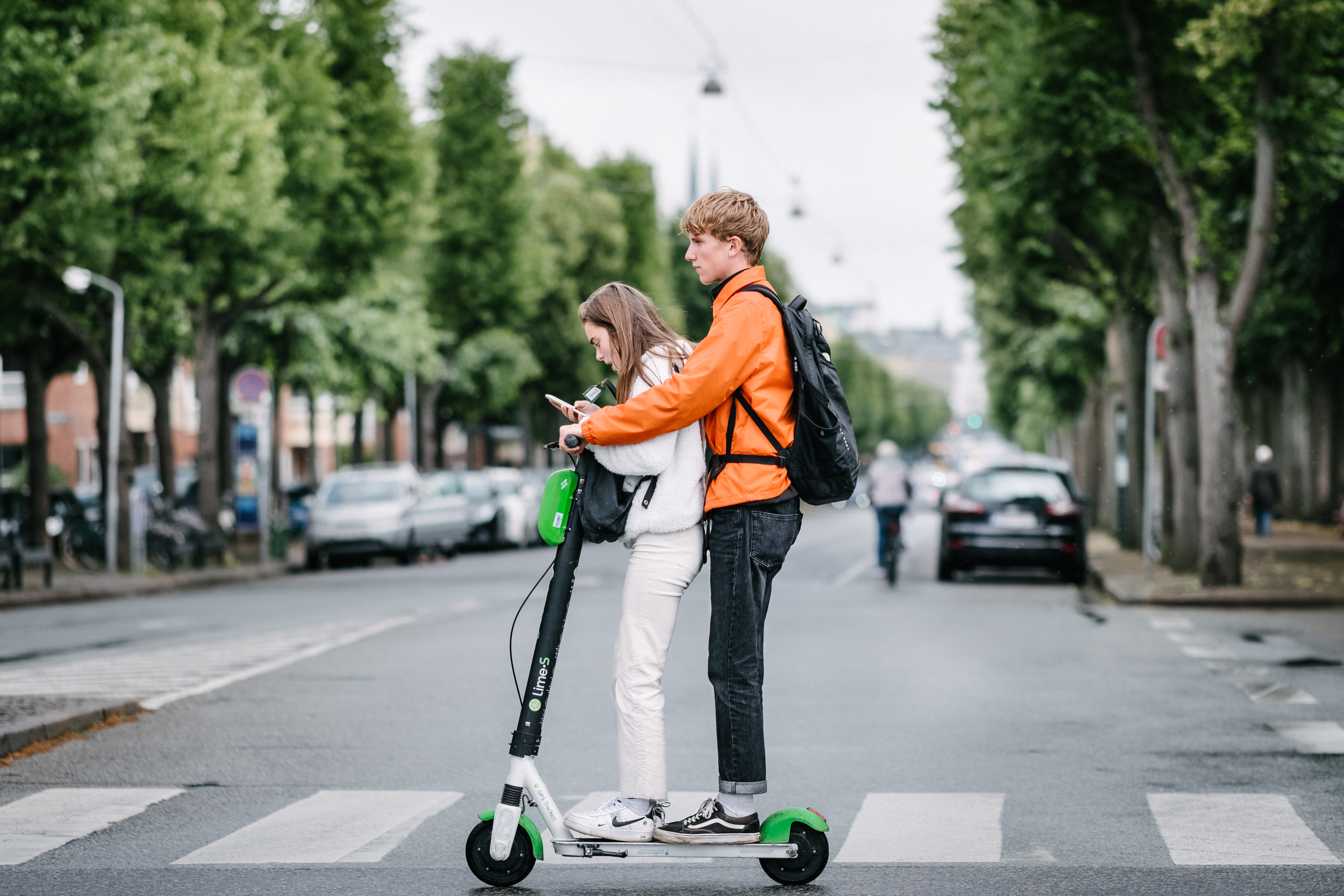
E-scooters are the most popular new motor vehicle in cities

Another possibility is forms of personal transport such as the electric skateboard/mountainboard, e-scooter, or personal transporters, such as self-balancing unicycles (i.e. Segway PT and others), which could serve as an alternative to cars and bicycles if they prove to be socially accepted.

Electric or internal combustion motorcycles (which also include scooters) are also an option. Internal combustion motorcycles do create some degree of local air pollution however. That said, the degree of local air pollution varies considerably depending on which fuel (i.e. gasoline, LPG, CNG/biogas, hydrogen) is injected to the internal combustion engine. This fuel can be freely chosen, and existing motorcycle engine can be converted to run on these. Hydrogen for instance is described as being "near-emissionless" when burned in an internal combustion engine.

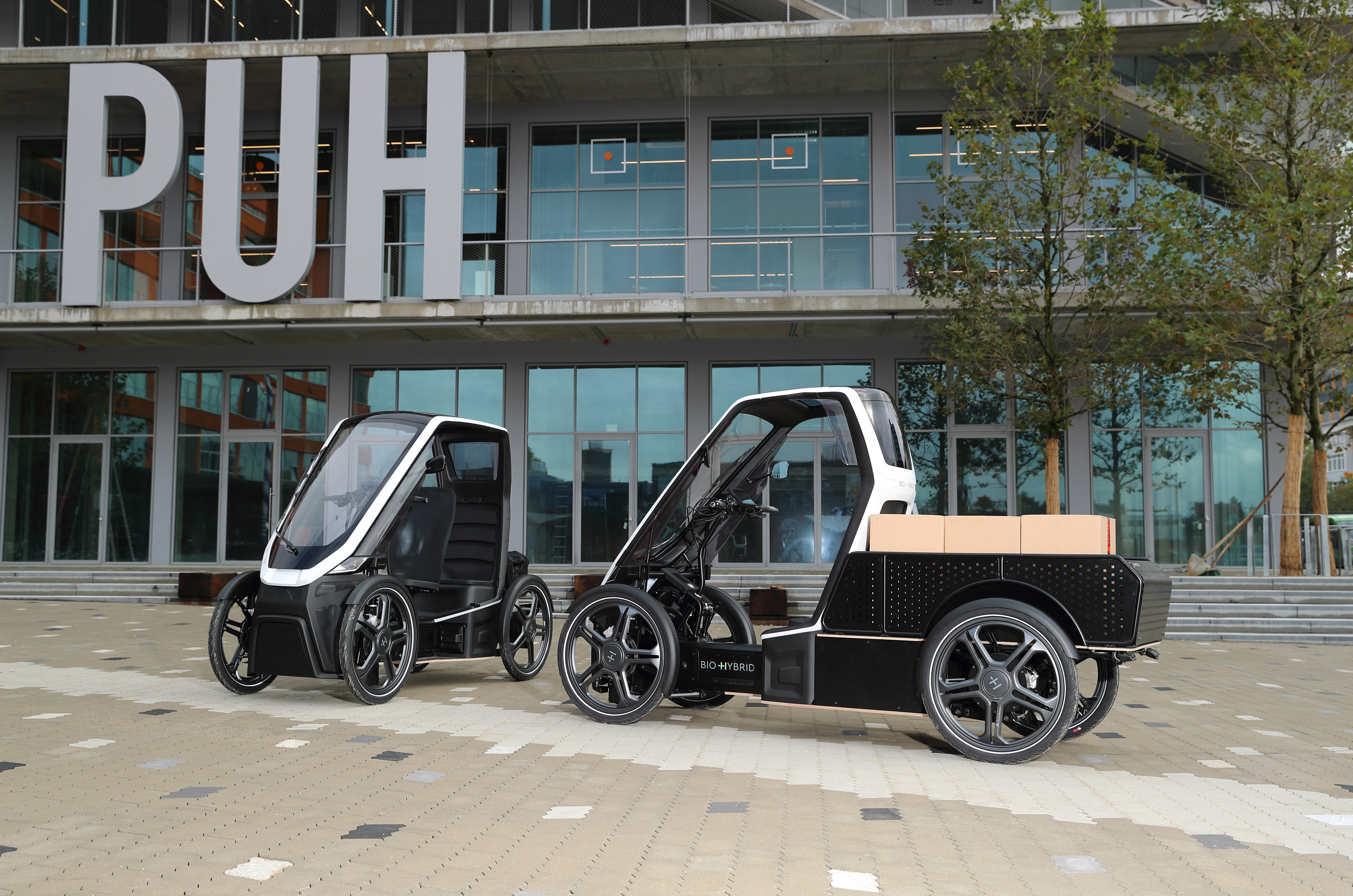
Motor assisted quadricycle

Also, velomobiles exist (including electric assisted versions), which compared to regular bicycles have the benefit of being enclosed (hence protecting the rider from the weather), and the potential of being motorized, which can allow one to travel greater distances (at a faster speed).

== Benefits ==
All of these alternative modes of transport pollute less than at least the petroleum-powered car and contribute to transport sustainability. They also provide other significant benefits such as reduced traffic-related injuries and fatalities, reduced space requirements, both for parking and driving, reduced resource usage and pollution related to both manufacturing and driving, increased social inclusion, increased economic and social equity, and more livable streets and cities. Some alternative modes of transportation, especially cycling, also provide regular, low-impact exercise, tailored to the needs of human bodies. Public transport is also linked to increased exercise, because they are combined in a multi-modal transport chain that includes walking or cycling.

A study which checked the costs and the benefits of introducing Low Traffic Neighbourhood in London found the benefits overpass the costs approximately by 100 times in the first 20 years and the difference is growing over time. The health benefits are "£4,800 per local adult" but became prominent generally 1-2 years after the scheme is introduced.

== See also ==
- Bicycle parking station
- Bike lane
- Bus rapid transit
- Car costs
- Car dependency
- Car-free movement
- Cargo bike
- Cycling infrastructure
- Effects of the car on societies
- Electric bicycle
- Environmental effects of transport
- Environmental movement
- Environmentalism
- Green transport hierarchy
- Green vehicle
- Human–electric hybrid vehicle
- List of bicycle-sharing systems
- List of emerging technologies – Transport
- Manufacturing emissions of electric cars
- Noise pollution
- Removal of curbside parking spaces: frees up space for bicycle lanes
- Street reclamation – Changing streets to focus on non-car use
- Sustainable transport
- Walkability
