= Health and environmental effects of battery electric cars =

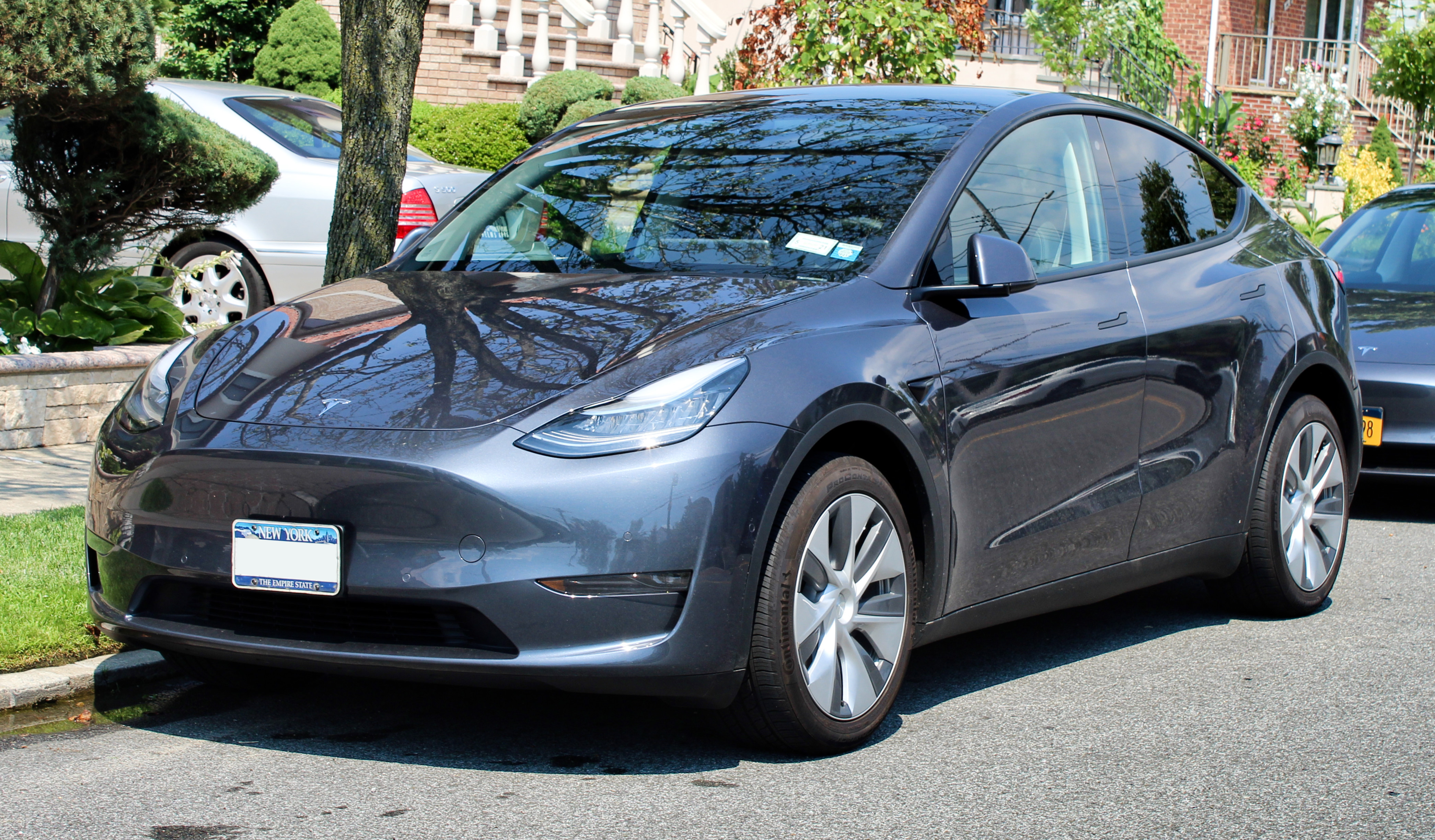
The Tesla Model Y was the world's top selling electric car in 2022.

Electric cars damage people's health and the environment less than similar sized internal combustion engine cars. While aspects of their production can induce similar, less or different environmental impacts, they produce no tailpipe emissions, and reduce dependence on petroleum, greenhouse gas emissions, and deaths from air pollution.

Electric motors are significantly more efficient than internal combustion engines and thus, even accounting for typical power plant efficiencies and distribution losses, less energy is required to operate an electric vehicle. Manufacturing batteries for electric cars requires additional resources and energy, so they may have a larger environmental footprint in the production phase. Electric vehicles also generate different impacts in their operation and maintenance. Electric vehicles are typically heavier and could produce more tire and road dust air pollution, but their regenerative braking could reduce such particulate pollution from brakes. Electric vehicles are mechanically simpler, which reduces the use and disposal of engine oil.

== Comparison with fossil-fueled cars ==
Although all cars have effects on other people, battery electric cars have major environmental benefits over conventional internal combustion engine vehicles, such as:

- Elimination of harmful tailpipe pollutants such as various oxides of nitrogen, which kill thousands of people every year
- Less CO_{2} emissions than fossil-fuelled cars, thus limiting climate change
- As almost all electric cars have regenerative braking, brake pads can be used less frequently than in non-electric cars, and may thus sometimes produce less particulate pollution than brakes in non-electric cars. Also, some electric cars may have a combination of drum brakes and disc brakes, and drum brakes are known to cause less particulate emissions than disc brakes. Under the Euro 7 standard electric cars have a lower limit of brake particulates.

Electric cars may have some disadvantages, such as:

- Possible increased tire pollution compared to fossil-fueled cars. This is sometimes caused by the fact that most electric cars have a heavy battery, which means the car's tires are subjected to more wear. Devices to capture tyre particulates are being developed, and under Euro 7 all new cars will have to meet the same tyre particulate limit.
- If electric cars are bigger than fossil fuel cars there may be more road dust pollution. However, as of 2024 more research on road dust air pollution is needed.

== Materials extraction impact ==
=== Raw materials ===
Plug-in hybrids and electric cars run off lithium-ion batteries and rare-earth element electric motors. As of 2016, a hybrid electric passenger car might use 5 kg (11 lb) of lithium carbonate equivalent, while one of Tesla's high performance electric cars could use as much as 80 kg (180 lb) of lithium carbonate equivalent.

Most electric vehicles use permanent magnet motors as they are more efficient than induction motors. These permanent magnets use neodymium and praseodymium which can be dirty and difficult to produce.

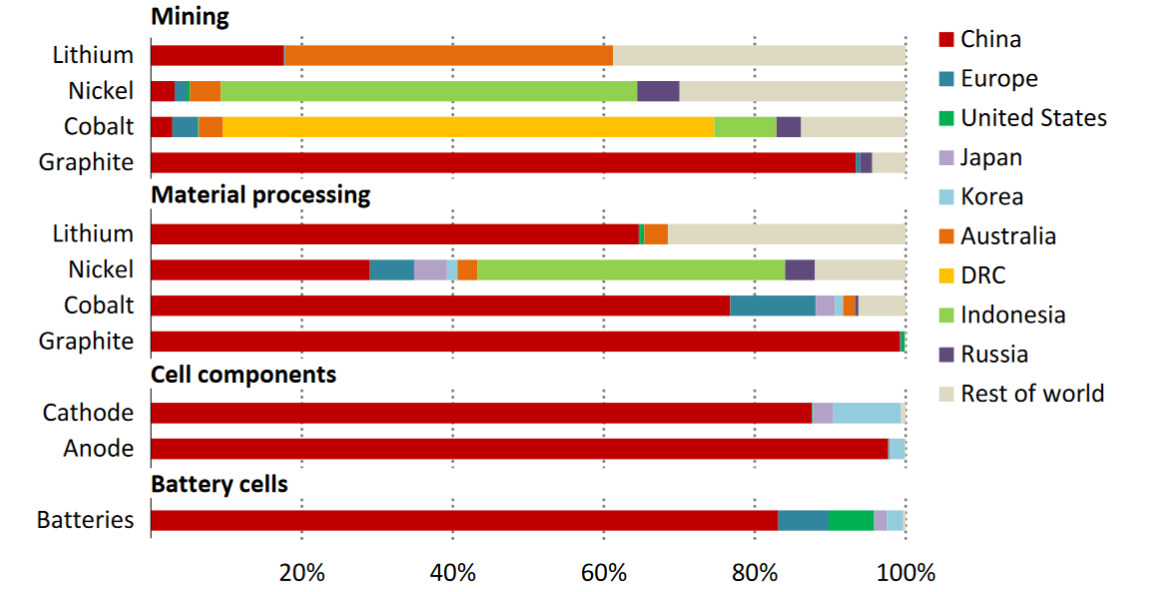
Geographical distribution of the global battery supply chain

The demand for lithium used by the batteries and rare-earth elements (such as neodymium, boron, and cobalt) used by the electric motors, is expected to grow significantly due to the future sales increase of plug-in electric vehicles. However, in 2024 The Economist wrote that "… within a decade or so most of the global demand for raw materials to build new batteries could be met by recycling old ones.".

In 2022 the Intergovernmental Panel on Climate Change said (with medium confidence) "Emerging national strategies on critical minerals and the requirements from major vehicle manufacturers are leading to new, more geographically diverse mines. The standardisation of battery modules and packaging within and across vehicle platforms, as well as increased focus on design for recyclability are important. Given the high degree of potential recyclability of lithium-ion batteries, a nearly closed-loop system in the future could mitigate concerns about critical mineral issues."

Open-pit nickel mining has led to environmental degradation and pollution in developing countries such as the Philippines and Indonesia. In 2024, nickel mining and processing was one of the main causes of deforestation in Indonesia. Open-pit cobalt mining has led to deforestation and habitat destruction in the Democratic Republic of Congo.

==== Lithium ====
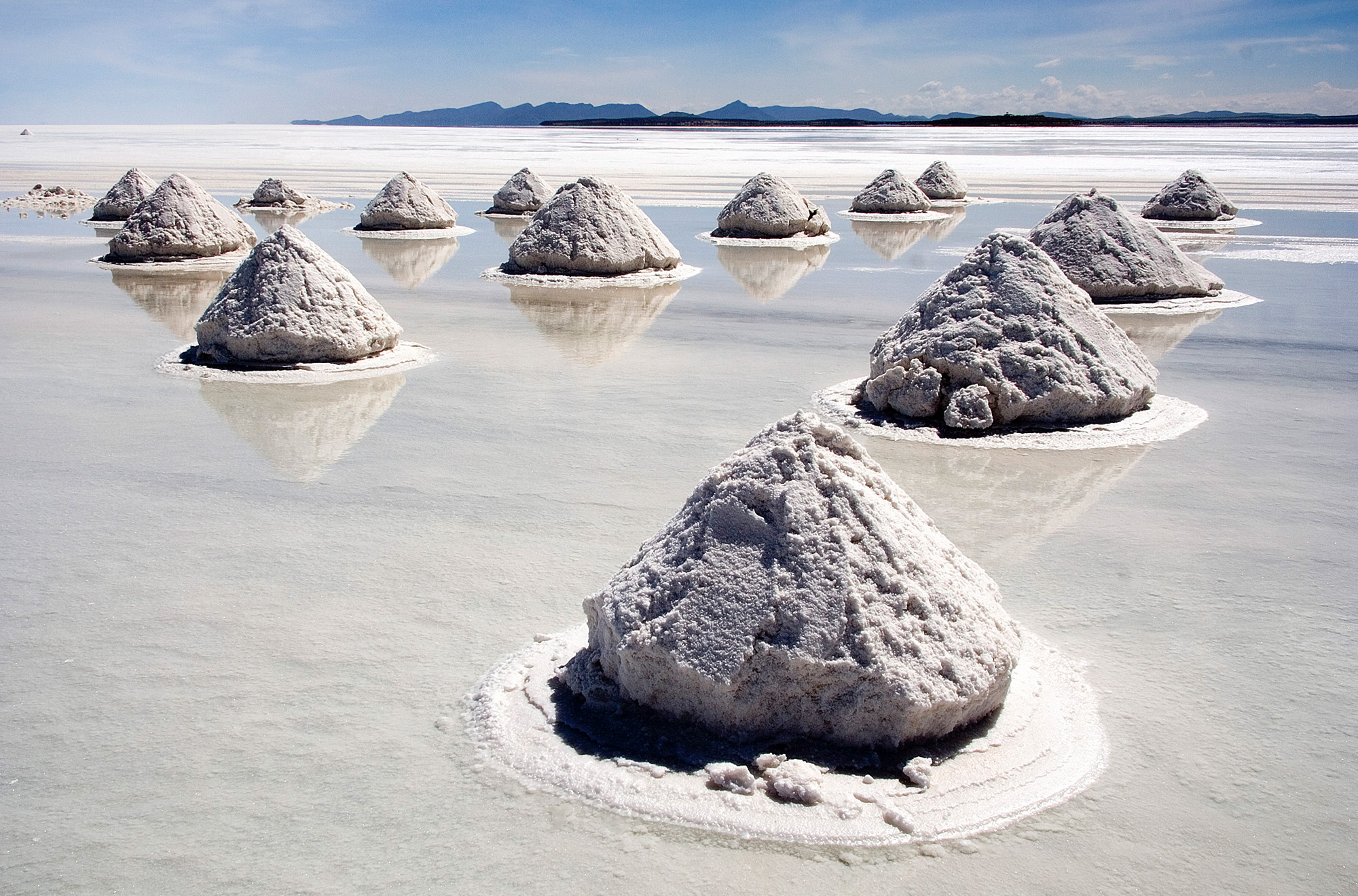
The Salar de Uyuni in Bolivia is one of the largest known lithium reserves in the world.

The main deposits of lithium are found in China and throughout the Andes mountain chain in South America. In 2008 Chile was the leading lithium metal producer with almost 30%, followed by China, Argentina, and Australia. Lithium recovered from brine, such as in Nevada and Cornwall, is much more environmentally friendly.

Nearly half the world's known reserves are located in Bolivia, and according to the US Geological Survey, Bolivia's Salar de Uyuni desert has 5.4 million tons of lithium. Other important reserves are located in Chile, China, and Brazil.

According to a 2020 study balancing lithium supply and demand for the rest of the century needs good recycling systems, vehicle-to-grid integration, and lower lithium intensity of transportation.

==== Rare-earth elements ====
Evolution of global rare-earth oxides production by country (1950–2000)

Electric motor manufactured for plug-in electric cars and hybrid electric vehicles use rare-earth elements. The demand for heavy metals, and other specific elements (such as neodymium, boron and cobalt) required for the batteries and powertrain is expected to grow significantly due to the future sales increase of plug-in electric vehicles in the mid and long term.

== Manufacturing impact ==
Electric cars also have impacts arising from the manufacturing of the vehicle. Electric cars can utilize two types of motors: permanent magnet motors (like the one found in the Mercedes EQA), and induction motors (like the one found on the Tesla Model 3). Induction motors do not use magnets, but permanent magnet motors do. The magnets found in permanent magnet motors used in electric vehicles contain rare-earth metals to increase the power output of these motors. The mining and processing of metals such as lithium, copper, and nickel can release toxic compounds into the surrounding area. Local populations may be exposed to toxic substances through air and groundwater contamination.

Several reports have found that hybrid electric vehicles, plug-in hybrids and all-electric cars generate more carbon emissions during their production than current internal combustion engine vehicles but still have a lower overall carbon footprint over the full life cycle. The initial higher carbon footprint is due mainly to battery production, which may double the production carbon footprint as of 2023 but this varies a lot by country and is forecast to decrease rapidly during the decade.

== Consumer use impacts ==
=== Carbon emissions ===
ICE vehicles typically produce more carbon emissions than EVs. Some of the environmental impact is shifted to the site of the generation plants, depending on the method by which the electricity used to recharge the batteries is generated. This shift of environmental impact from the vehicle itself (in the case of internal combustion engine vehicles) to the source of electricity (in the case of electric vehicles) is referred to as the long tailpipe of electric vehicles. This impact, however, is still less than that of traditional vehicles, as the large size of power plants allow them to pollute less per unit power than internal combustion engines, and electricity generation continues to become greener as renewables such as wind, solar and nuclear power become more widespread.

The specific emission intensity of generating electric power varies significantly with respect to location and time, depending on current demand and availability of renewable sources (See List of renewable energy topics by country and territory). The phase-out of fossil fuels and coal and transition to renewable and low-carbon power sources will make electricity generation greener, which will reduce the impact of electric vehicles that use that electricity.

Most of the lithium-ion battery production occurs in China, where the bulk of energy used is supplied by coal burning power plants. A study of hundreds of cars on sale in 2021 concluded that the life cycle GHG emissions of full electric cars are slightly less than hybrids and that both are less than gasoline and diesel fuelled cars. Battery electric cars emit less greenhouse gas than gasoline cars in the United States.

=== Air pollution ===
Compared to conventional internal combustion engine automobiles, electric cars reduce local air pollution, especially in cities, as they do not emit harmful tailpipe pollutants such as particulates (soot), volatile organic compounds, hydrocarbons, carbon monoxide, ozone, lead, and various oxides of nitrogen.

The operation of any car results in non-exhaust emissions such as brake dust, airborne road dust, and tire erosion, which contribute to particulate matter in the air. Particulate matter is dangerous for respiratory health. In the UK non-tailpipe particulate emissions from all types of vehicles (including electric vehicles) may be responsible for between 7,000 and 8,000 premature deaths a year. Due to regenerative braking EVs produce less brake dust, but have more tire erosion due to their higher weight. This means that usually EVs have fewer non-exhaust emissions than combustion cars. By 2050, cleaner air by the use of electric cars can save over 1163 lives annually and over $12.61 billion in health benefits in many major U.S. metropolitan cities such as Los Angeles and New York City.

=== Lower operational impacts and maintenance needs ===
Battery electric vehicles have lower maintenance costs compared to internal combustion vehicles since electronic systems break down much less often than the mechanical systems in conventional vehicles, and the fewer mechanical systems onboard last longer due to the better use of the electric engine. Electric cars do not require oil changes and other routine maintenance checks.

Internal combustion engines are relatively inefficient at converting on-board fuel energy to propulsion as most of the energy is wasted as heat, and the rest while the engine is idling. Electric motors, on the other hand, are more efficient at converting stored energy into driving a vehicle. Electric drive vehicles do not consume energy while at rest or coasting, and modern plug-in cars can capture and reuse as much as one fifth of the energy normally lost during braking through regenerative braking.

=== Low repairability ===
BEVs are easily totaled because of battery damage, and some have called for the right to repair. Some EVs are made using gigacasting to lower their cost, which complicates repairs.

=== Water usage ===
Overall whether an electric car uses more water than a fossil-fuelled car mainly depends on how the electricity is generated in the region that the car is used, for example in China in the 2010s an electric car used more. Up to 150,000 liters of water are required to put out a single electric car fire. Fossil-fuelled car fires are typically extinguished using less than 4,000 liters. However electric cars are much less likely to catch fire.

== End-of-life ==
=== Batteries ===
==== Lead–acid ====
Like internal combustion engine cars, most electric cars, as of 2023, contain lead–acid batteries which are used to power the vehicle's auxiliary electrical systems. In some countries lead acid batteries are not recycled safely.

==== Lithium-ion ====
Current retirement criteria for lithium-ion batteries in electric vehicles cite 80% capacity for end-of-first-life, and 65% capacity for end-of-second-life. The first-life defines the lifespan of the battery's intended use, while the second-life defines the lifespan of the battery's subsequent use-case. Lithium-ion batteries from cars can sometimes be re-used for a second-life in factories or as stationary batteries. Some electric vehicle manufacturers, such as Tesla, claim that a lithium-ion battery that no longer fulfills the requirements of its intended use can be serviced by them directly, thereby lengthening its first-life. Reused electric vehicle batteries can potentially supply 60-100% of the grid-scale lithium-ion energy storage by 2030. The carbon footprint of an electric vehicle lithium-ion battery can be reduced by up to 17% if reused rather than immediately retired. After retirement, direct recycling processes allow reuse of cathode mixtures, which removes processing steps required for manufacturing them. When this is infeasible, individual materials can be obtained through pyrometallurgy and hydrometallurgy. When lithium-ion batteries are recycled, if they are not handled properly, the harmful substances inside may pollute the environment. These same processes can also endanger workers and damage their health. Vehicle fires cause local pollution. Recent research has reviewed sustainable recycling strategies for lithium-ion batteries used in electric vehicles, including methods for recovering valuable battery materials. Improving these processes could help recover materials for reuse and reduce the need for newly mined resources. However, challenges remain in implementing recycling methods at an industrial scale, making further improvements important as electric vehicle use increases.

=== Motors ===
Although there are several ways the electric motors can be recycled, as of 2024 about half of the magnetic material is lost: this is partly because very few manufacturers consider end-of-life in the design.

== See also ==
- All-electric mode
- Battery
- Battery fade
- Converting existing vehicle to electric
- Downcycling of end-of-life e-automotive batteries
- Electric power
- Full cost accounting
- GREET Model
- Hybrid electric vehicle
- Induction motor
- Modal shift
- Neighborhood Electric Vehicle
- Phase-out of fossil fuel vehicles
- Plug-in hybrid electric car
- Solar car
