= Twike =

German electric vehicle manufacturer

TWIKE
- Type: GmbH
- Industry: Automotive
- Founded: 1998
- Headquarters: Rosenthal, Germany
- Area served: Worldwide
- Key people: Martin Moescheid
- Website: twike.com/en

Twike, based in Rosenthal, is a German manufacturer of light electric vehicles in the European Union vehicle class L5e (US motorcycle). The main product, the Twike (a portmanteau of the words twin and bike), is a human-electric hybrid vehicle (HEHV) designed to carry two passengers and cargo. Essentially a velomobile with an electrical hybrid engine, it can be driven in electric-only mode or electric + pedal power mode.

== History ==
=== Prototype by ETH Zurich ===
The Twike 1 prototype was designed by students at ETH Zurich. It was developed for the 1986 EXPO in Vancouver . The tricycle, initially conceived in Switzerland, was originally designed as a pure velomobile without motor assistance. Inspired by the success of the Twike I, a group of enthusiasts began developing the second generation as a step towards a vehicle for everyday road use.

=== Twike 2 with electric motor ===
In order to be able to compete with other cars in everyday use, a prototype with electric assistance was developed and presented to the public in 1991 as the Twike II. In 1992, Twike AG, based in Gelterkinden, Switzerland, was founded to bring the prototype to series production. It was developed in collaboration with Alusuisse-Lonza Holding and shown for the first time at the HEUREKA exhibition in Zurich.

=== Series production from 1995 ===
In 1992, Twike AG decided to further develop the Twike II into a series vehicle and began looking for capital and customers. Production of the Twike III began in 1995, three years later. In the course of the first year, the reformed AG produced and sold 190 vehicles, mainly in Switzerland and Germany. In 1999, Twike AG merged with the Swiss company S-LEM AG, which was allowed to assemble the Twike itself from 1997, to form SwissLEM AG, based in Hochdorf, Switzerland.

=== FINE Mobile from 1998 ===
In 1998, FINE Mobile GmbH ("Forum für Intelligente und Nachhaltige Elektro-Mobile") was founded, initially based in Augsburg. The aim of the shareholders was to be the general importer for Germany. In the same year, FINE Mobile also launched the German production line. Kits imported from Switzerland were finally assembled in Germany. One reason for this was the German approval regulations, which required, for example, a laminated glass windshield, while the Swiss series was equipped with Plexiglas.

=== Twike GmbH ===
When SwissLEM went bankrupt in the summer of 2002, FINE Mobile took over the production and brand rights for the Twike. In 2002, the company headquarters were also relocated from Augsburg to Rosenthal. Since then, FINE Mobile GmbH from Rosenthal has been the rights holder and sole producer of the Twike worldwide. At the beginning of 2020, FINE Mobile GmbH changed its name to TWIKE GmbH.

== Products ==
=== Twike 1 ===
The Twike 1 is a two-seater bicycle with a body. The ergonomic and aerodynamic experiment was developed by Swiss students at ETH Zurich. The idea was presented at the EXPO in Vancouver in 1986. The concept is based on a recumbent bike in which two people pedal side by side. The first Twike model was purely muscle-powered and not electrified. It weighed 50 kg and could be accelerated to a speed of up to 50 km/h. In 1986, it won an award for ergonomics at the World Expo in Vancouver.

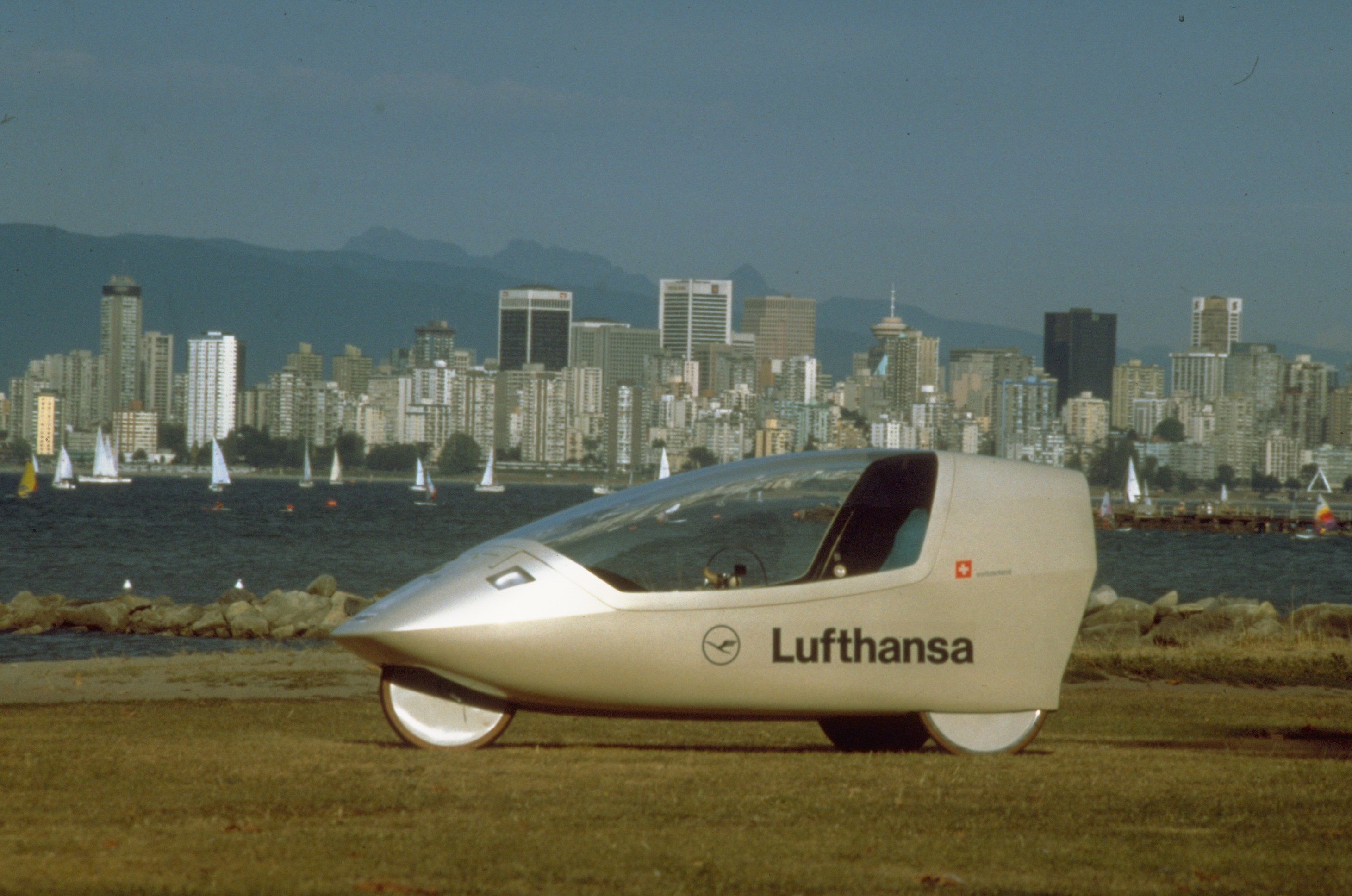
Twike 1 bei der Expo 1986

=== Twike 2 ===
The Twike 2 was introduced in 1991. It had a belt pedal drive with continuously variable mechanical transmission and a DC motor powered by NiCd batteries to drive the vehicle. With the support of an electric motor, the hybrid model's suitability for everyday use was significantly improved.

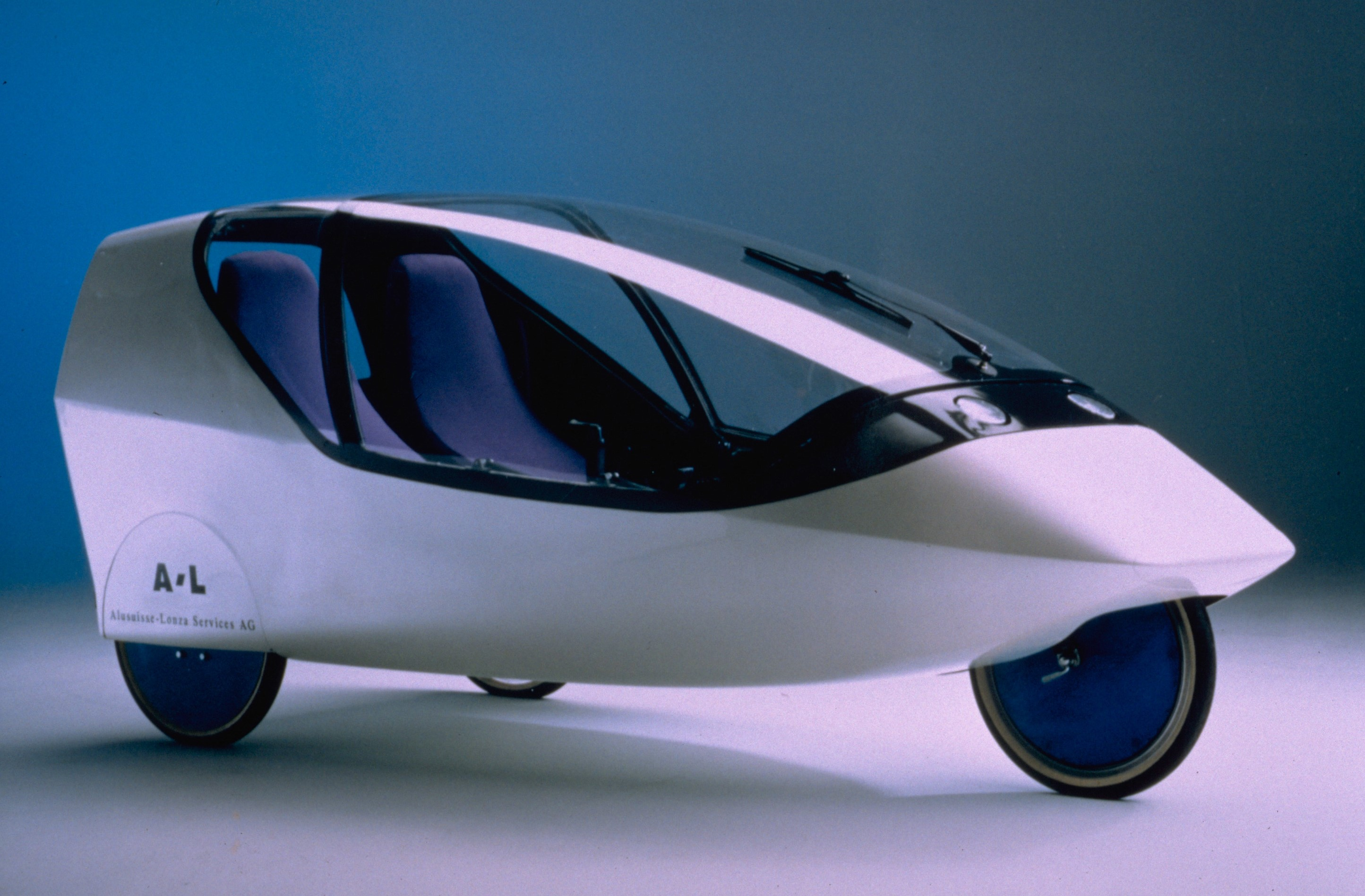
Twike 2 (Twike Klub 1991).jpg

=== Twike 3 ===
The Twike 3 has been built almost unchanged since its development was completed in 1995. Only minor modifications have been made to the body, interior and batteries since then. Since the start of construction, well over 1,000 vehicles have been built by hand. Due to the constant improvement in battery capacity during the construction period, the range of the Twike 3 has increased from around 60 km initially to over 610 km recently.

==== Gallery Twike 3 ====
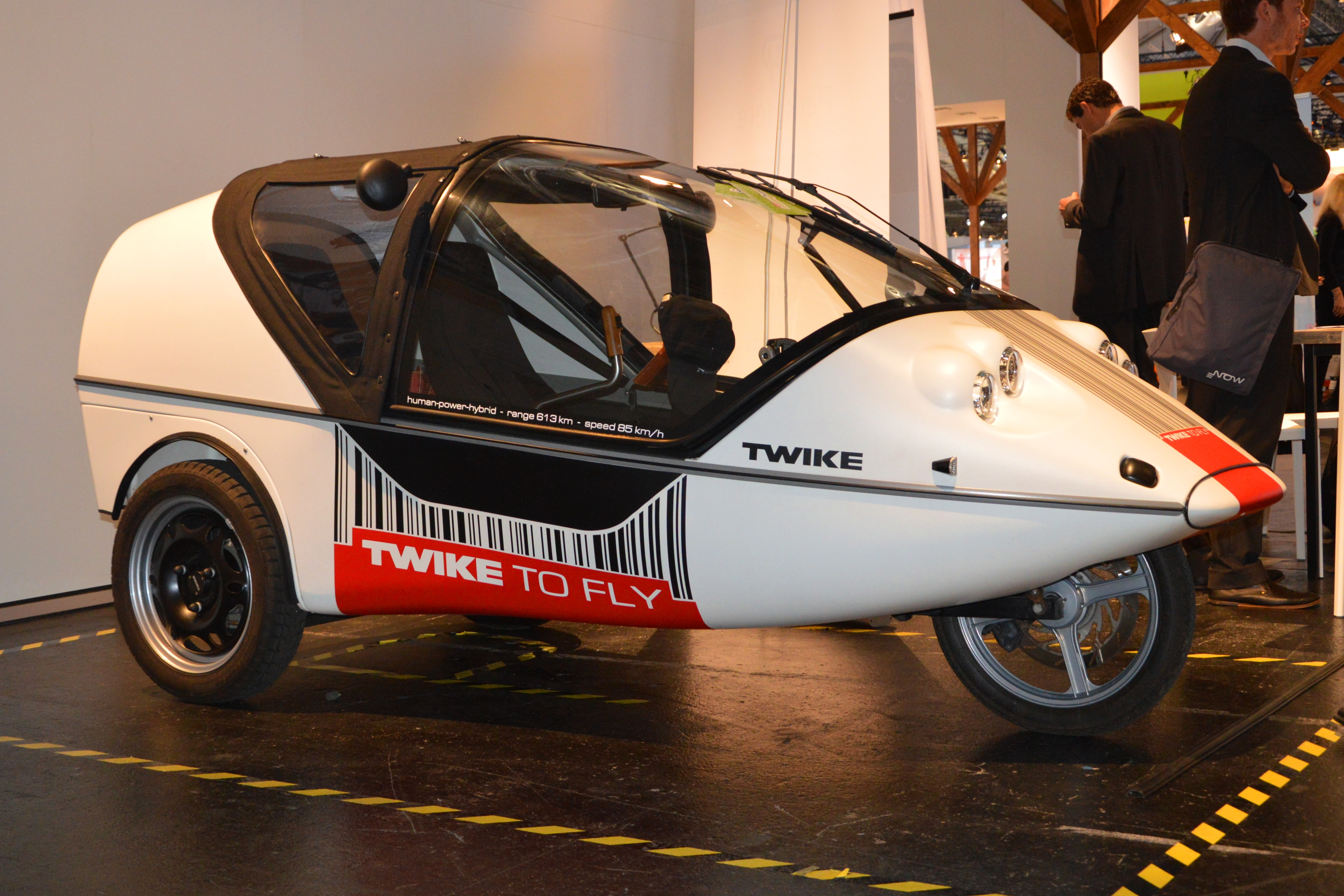
Twike 3 at the IAA 2015 in Frankfurt

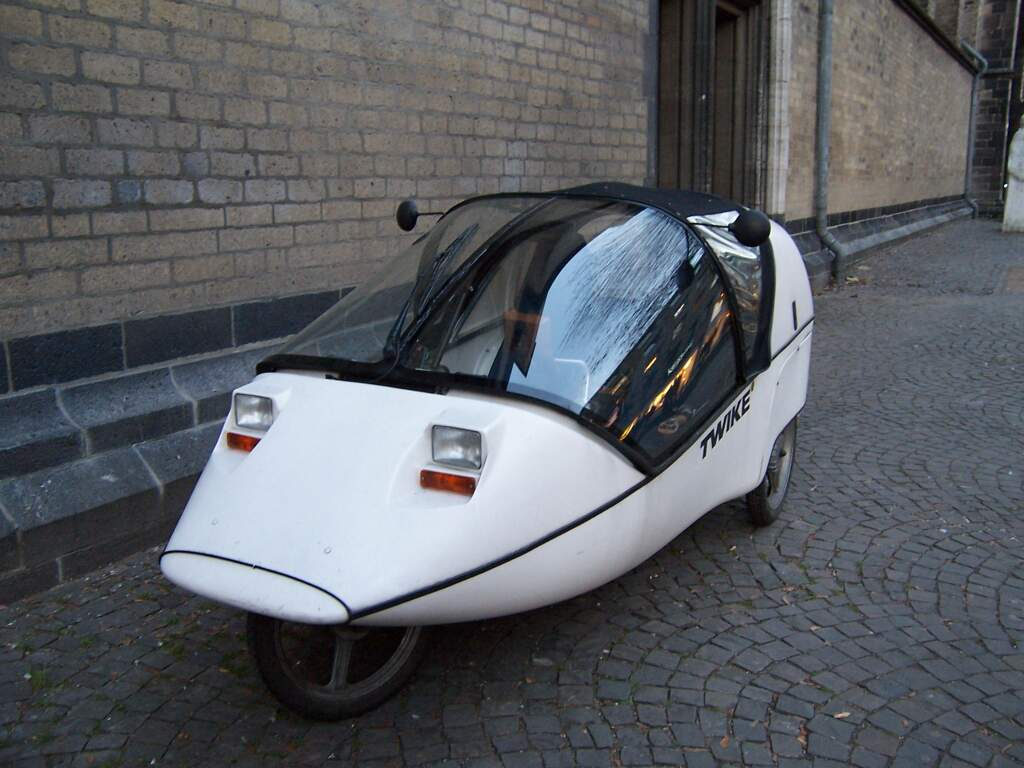
Twike 3 Facelift front view

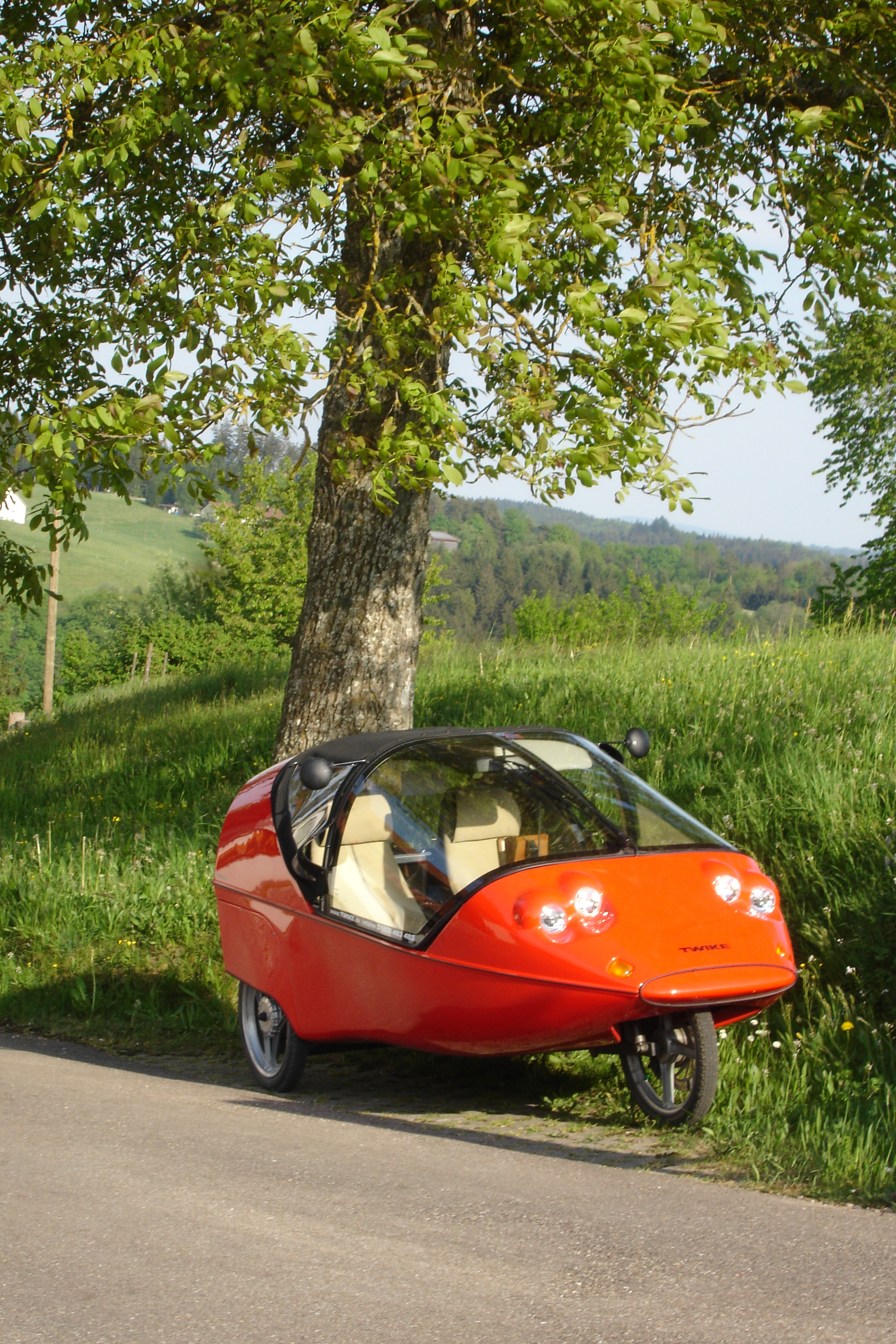
Red Twike Active

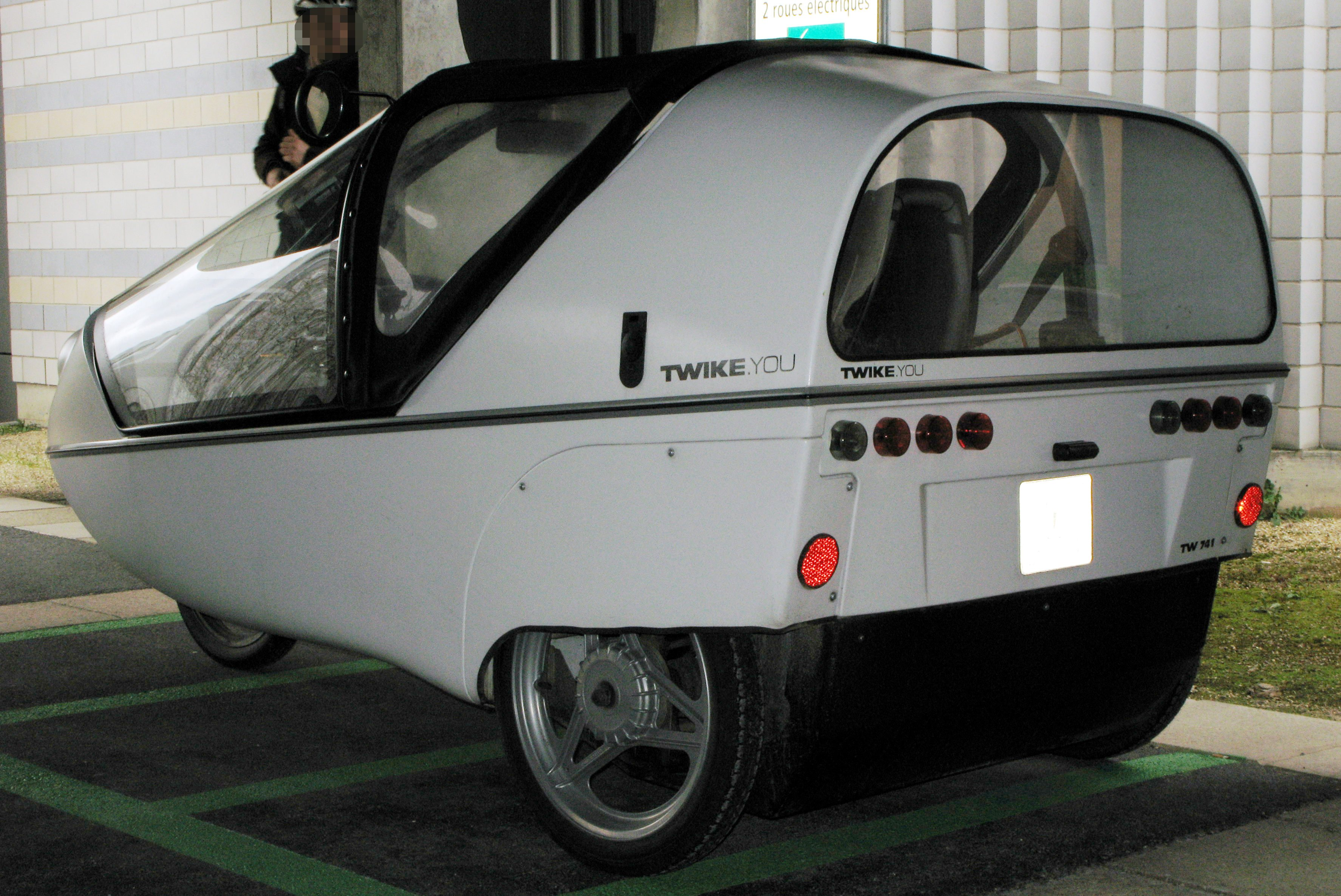
Twike 3 Facelift rear view

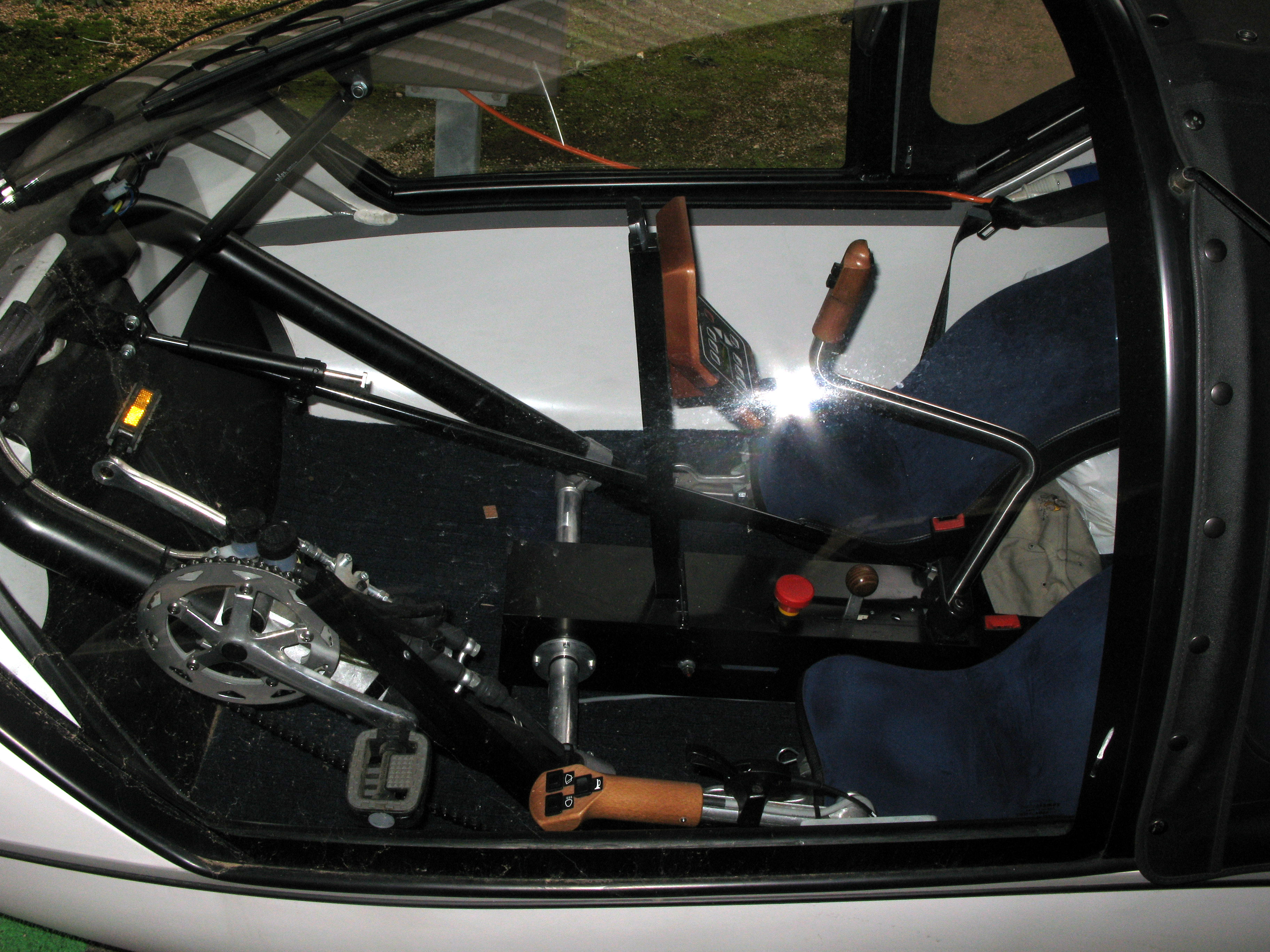
Interior view Twike 3

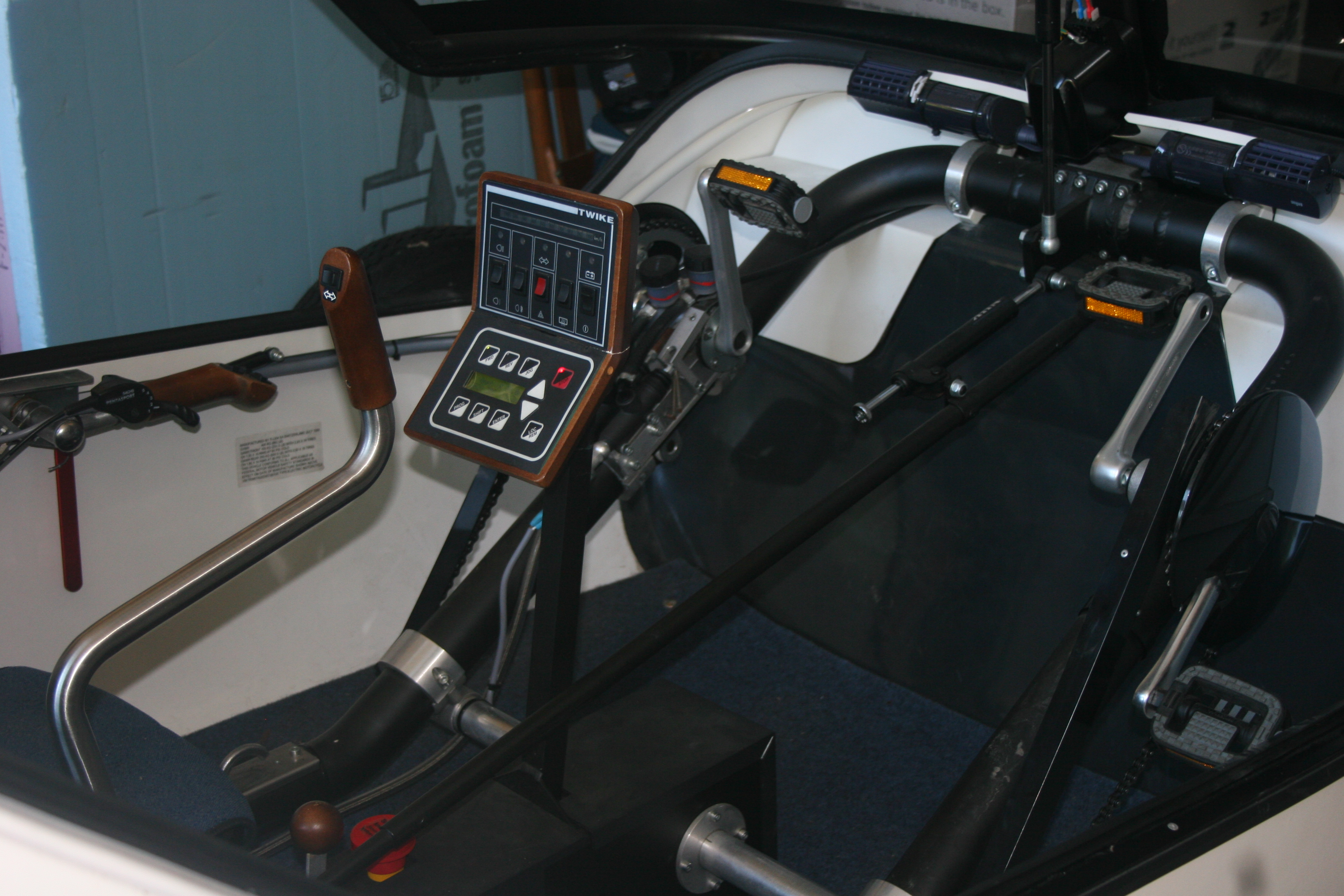
Interior of Powerplant 433, a 1998 Twike Active

==== Construction ====
The Twike 3 is essentially a velomobile constructed from lightweight materials such as aluminum (frame) and plastic (shell) with an electric drive. The light electric vehicle of the EU vehicle class L5e can be operated either purely electrically or additionally with pedal power to increase the range. The platform of the three-wheel design corresponds to the basic shape of a "delta" with a (steerable) front wheel and a rear axle with two wheels and is designed to carry two people plus freight. Both the engine and batteries, the luggage compartment and a large part of the weight of the people being transported are placed on the rear axle with a low center of gravity. This results in favorable tipping stability. The hood of the Twike 3 serves as an additional roll bar and carries the laminated glass window (subject to registration in Germany) or a lighter Plexiglas window and the removable convertible or targa top.

==== Operating ====
The Twike 3 is steered using a sidestick (steering lever) between the seats. Two two-stage buttons on the sidestick are used for acceleration and braking, including recuperation. A control panel in the middle of the cab contains the controls for the headlights, rear fog light, hazard warning lights, windshield heating fan, on/off switch and the on-board computer. To the left of the driver is the handbrake lever with further integrated controls: High beam, windshield wipers and horn. To get in, the hood is raised forwards, supported by a gas spring. Acceleration and braking are controlled by two two-stage buttons on the right-hand steering lever. For emergency braking and for stopping or parking, the driver operates the pedal system using the back pedal. In addition to extending the range, the switchable pedal drive also has a fitness function.

==== Motor ====
For propulsion, the Twike 3 has a three-phase electric motor with a rated output of 3 kW and a peak output of up to 9 kW. The two rear wheels are driven directly by a motor via a differential gear. This enables the vehicle to reach a speed of 85 km/h on level ground. A pedal drive is installed for the driver and passenger. It can be operated independently of each other, but is not necessary for propulsion. The pedal assistance is designed for speeds of up to 70 km/h as standard. On some models, the gear ratio is increased so that you can pedal comfortably even at top speed. Acceleration from a standstill using muscle power is not intended and can only be achieved with intensive effort, even on flat terrain.

==== Power supply ====
Battery technology has made considerable progress since the Twike was launched. The Twike 3 initially used NiCd batteries, later Li-Mn. The introduction of Li-ion batteries in the 2008 model year represented a major leap forward in terms of range and cycle stability. The Twike was the first series-produced vehicle in the world to use Li-ion batteries. The Twike 3 was last produced with lithium-ion batteries in five performance classes. The smallest battery unit delivers 3.53 kWh with a range of more than 80 km and the largest 24.7 kWh with a range of up to 613 km. The battery can be charged at a conventional household socket, but also at a public charging station. The energy is also recovered during the journey through regenerative braking, and the electric system is relieved by the pedal system, which transfers its power directly to the drivetrain. Both systems work in parallel and not in series.

==== Consumption and range ====
The weight of the Twike 3 is 240-350 kilograms. Depending on the battery and driving style, the range is between 40 and 613 km with a consumption of around 4 to 7 kWh/100 km. This corresponds to 14.4-25.2 megajoules/100 km. The significantly lower energy consumption compared to the combustion engine is due to the much higher efficiency of the electric drive, the aerodynamically favorable design with a small cross-sectional area and the lightweight construction (aluminum, plastic). The moderate top speed and regenerative braking also have a positive effect on the Twike 3's fuel consumption. In 2020, the US Environmental Protection Agency (EPA) carried out a fuel consumption comparison of various electric vehicles registered in the USA. The Tesla Model 3 Long Range AWD, model year 2021, was ranked first in the table with a consumption of 25 kWh / 100 miles (equivalent to 15.5 kWh / 100 km). The 25-year-old technology of the Twike 3 undercuts this value by at least half.

=== Twike 4 ===
To further develop the basic concept of the Twike 3, the Twike 4, initially under the name TW4XP ("Threewheeler for X Prize"), has been developed and tested since 2009. The exterior and interior are very different from its predecessor. The Twike 4 is steered with two sidesticks by pulling back and forth. It has pedals that act as a foot brake. The aim of the completely new development was to significantly improve the Twike in terms of performance, riding characteristics and comfort. The Twike 4 never went into series production, but as a prototype it came third out of 136 teams at the Automotive X Prize in the USA in 2010. A former BMW engineer advised on the chassis, while the software and the electric vehicle architecture were developed by EDAG in Fulda. The Twike 4 has been optimized for use at 120 km/h on the highway.

==== Gallery Twike 4 ====
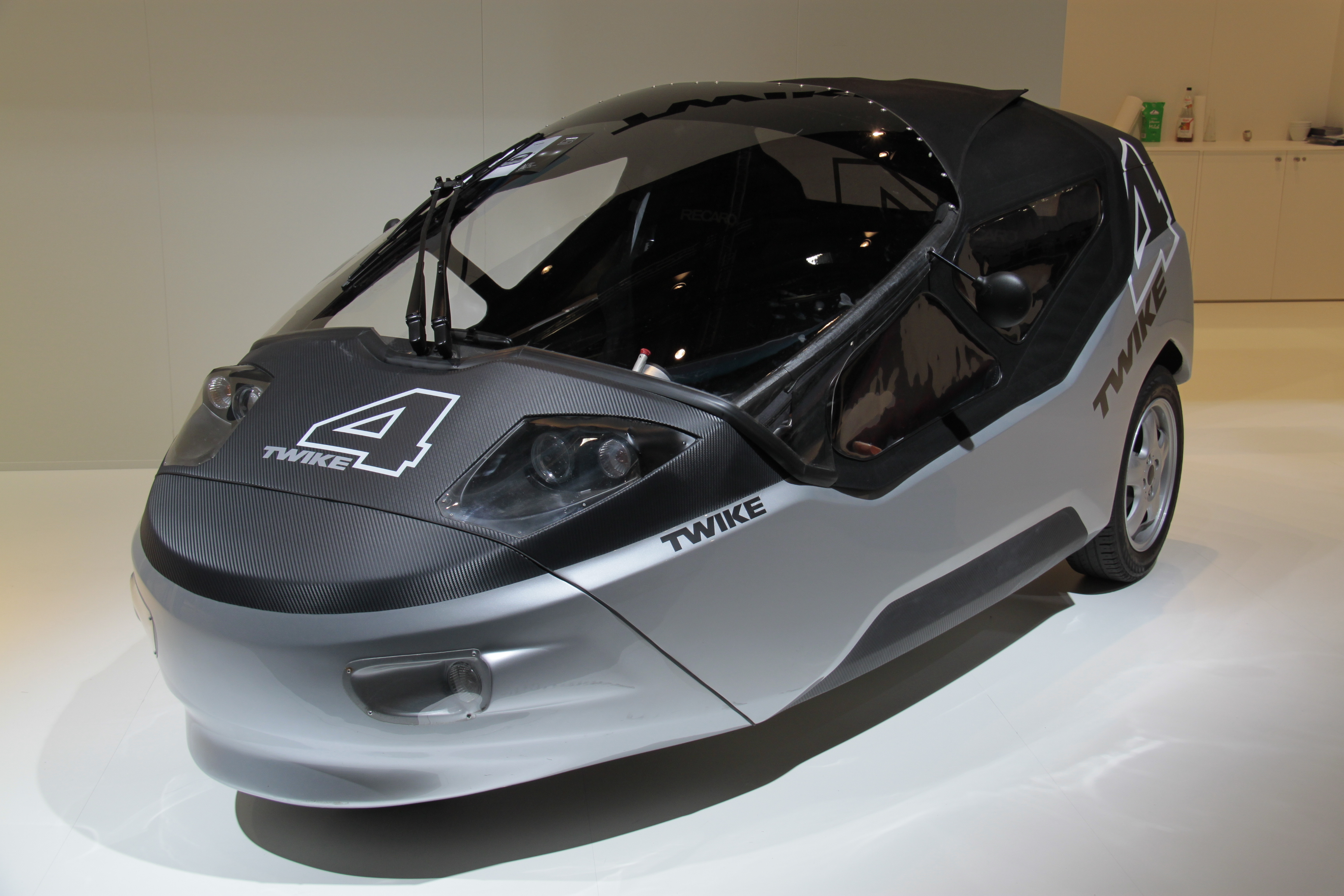
Twike 4 at the IAA 2015 in Frankfurt

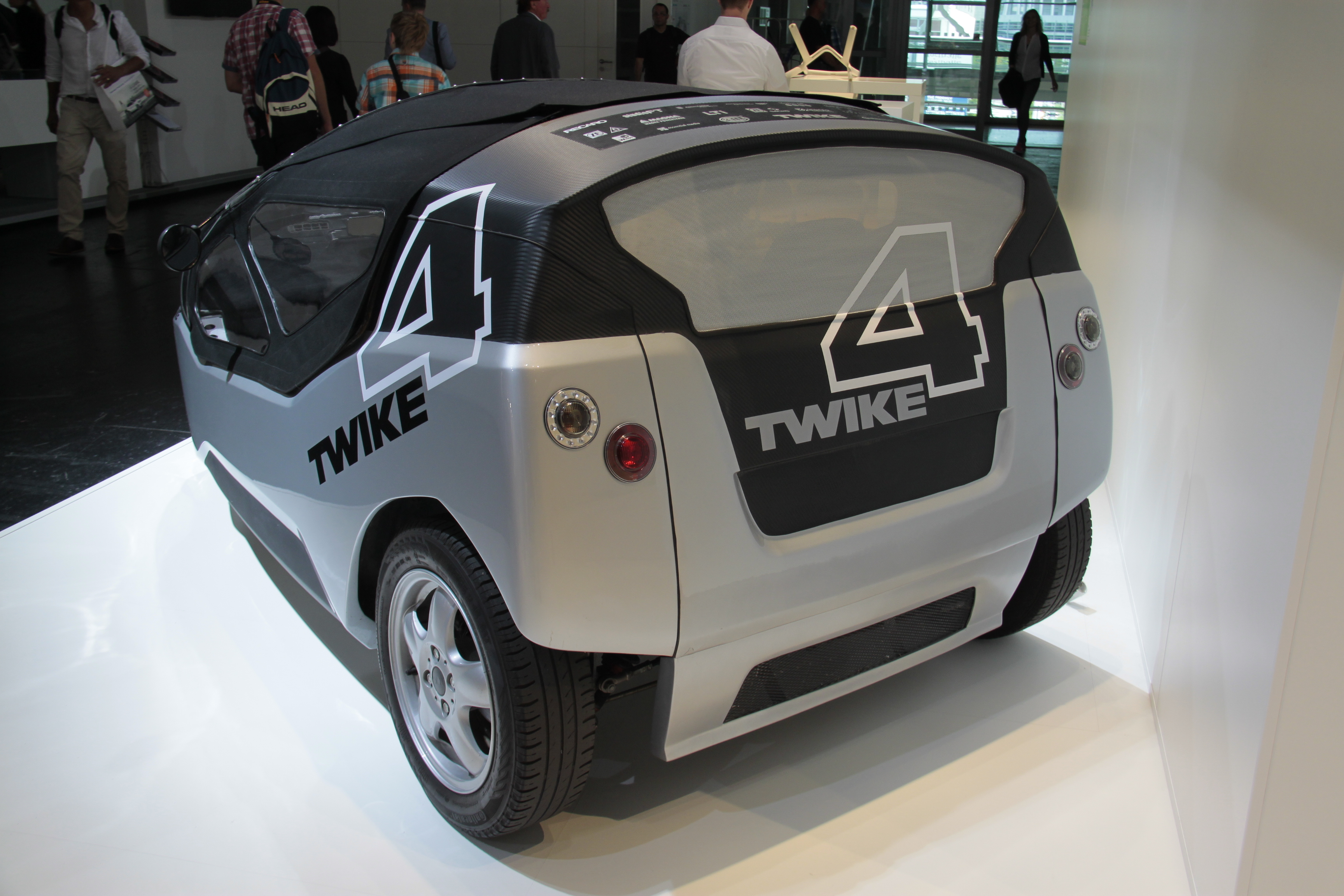
Twike 4 IAA 2015

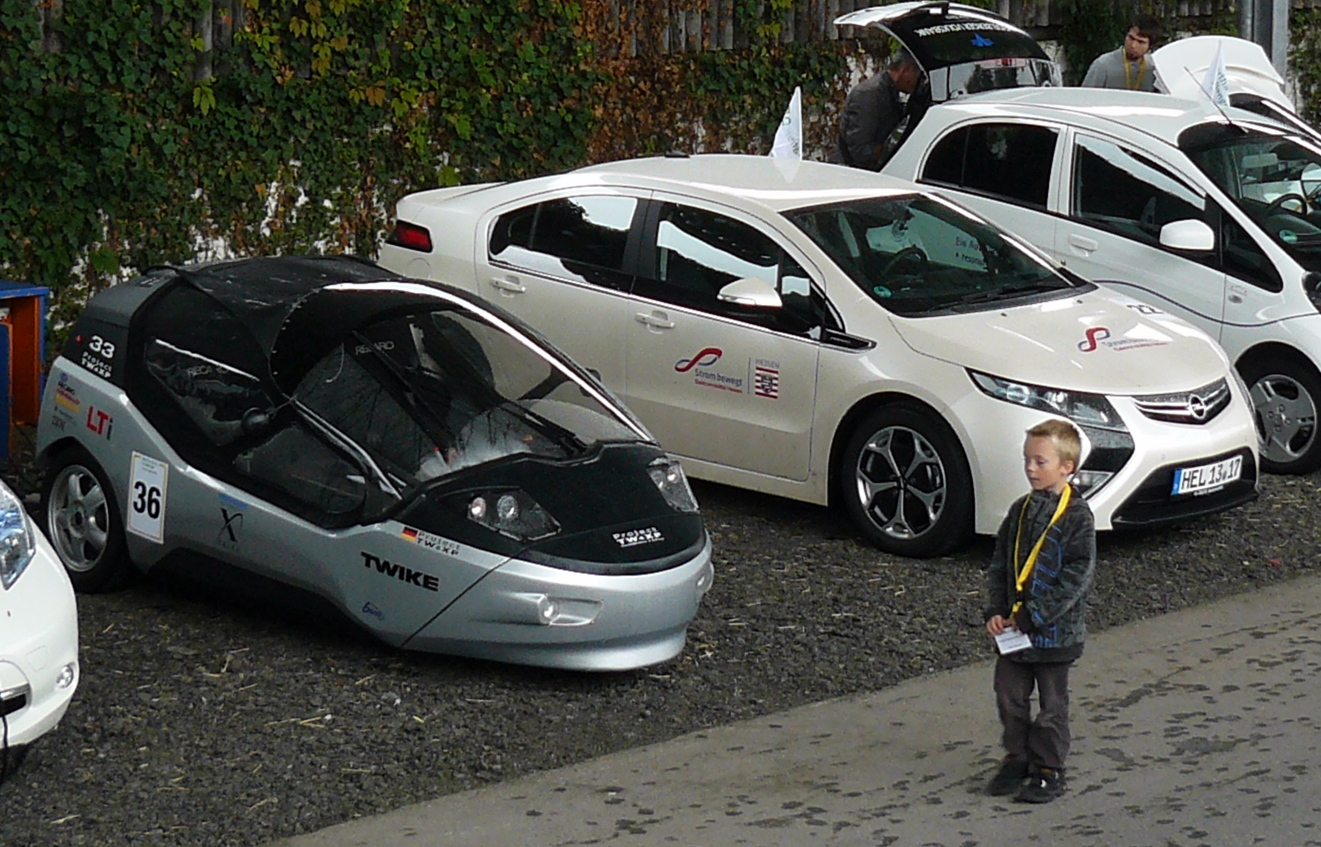
Twike TW4XP

=== Twike 5 ===
A frame concept of the Twike 5 was first presented at the Geneva Motor Show in 2019. In contrast to the Twike 4, which was intended as a prototype from the outset, the 5 model is being developed for series production. Overall, the aim is to create a vehicle with a top speed of 190 km/h that is more similar to a conventional car in terms of driving comfort and safety. The similarities with the Twike 3 are limited to the EU vehicle class and the possibility of reducing the vehicle's energy consumption through muscular assistance, apart from the delta suspension. Instead of a direct pedal drive with a chain, a pedal generator (300 watts, standard on the driver's side, optional on the passenger's side) is used.

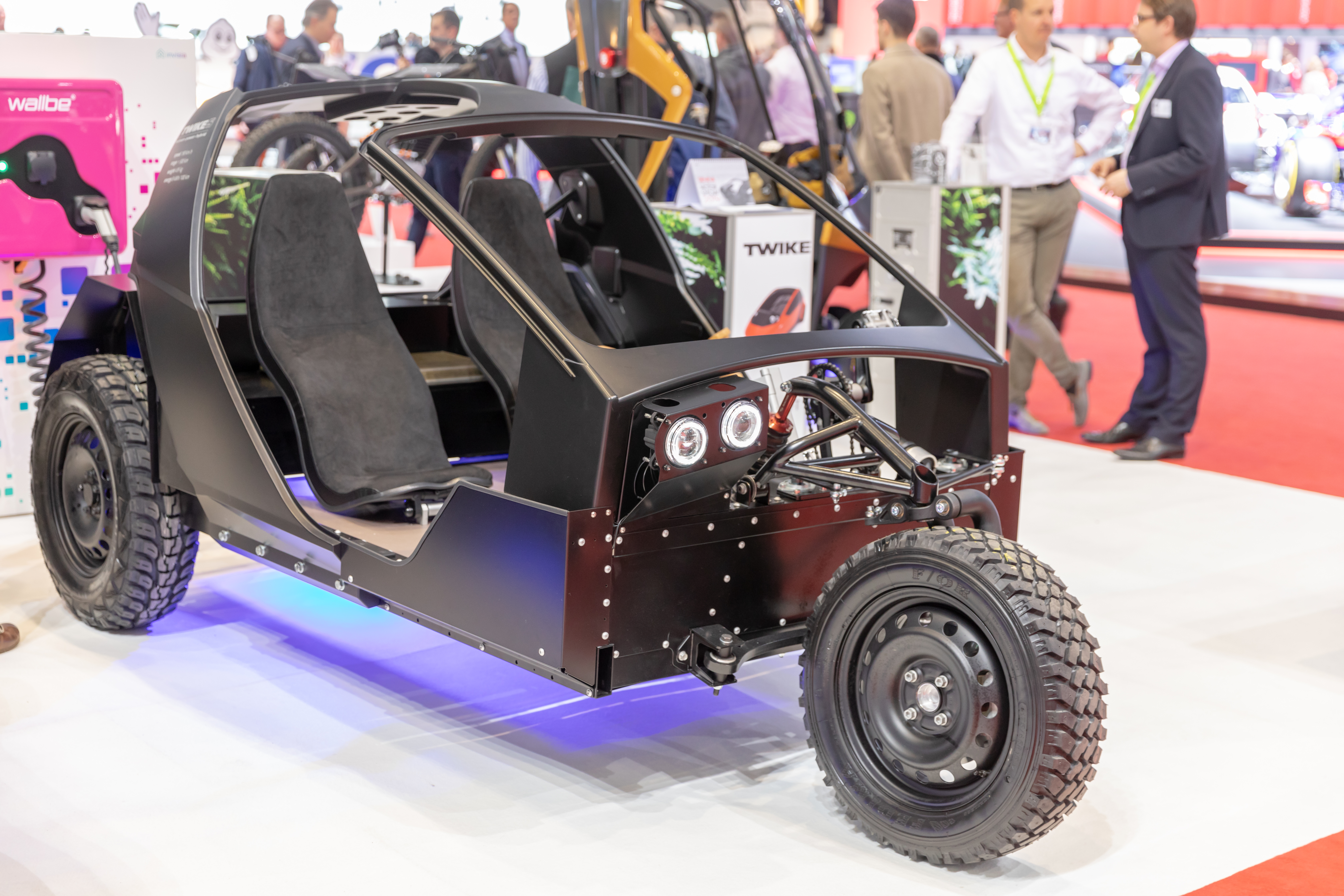
Twike 5 at the Geneva International Motor Show 2019

==== Construction ====
Development of the Twike 5 began in 2015 with the aim of taking a leading role in short-distance transportation in the automotive market. The lightweight electric vehicle combines a recumbent bike, e-bike and e-car and consists of a modular safety cell with an aluminum frame and roll bar made of high-strength steel. It is to be encased in natural fiber-reinforced plastic. In comparison to the Twike 3, the batteries, as in the Zwike 4, move from the rear as a space-saving floor plate under the seats. This results in a lower center of gravity. The optimum tipping stability of the tricycle has been improved and, with a vehicle width of 1.55 m, is at its optimum and corresponds to that of a sports car. In addition, the 5 Series has a new hood concept, is 100 kg lighter and has a double trailing arm swing arm with wheel bearing flange for classic car rims on the front axle. The rear axle is equipped with a twistable DeDion composite suspension with stabilizer bar.

==== Operating ====
An important innovation is the new steering system with acceleration rocker introduced on the Twike 4, including a 2-stage push button for acceleration and electric braking. Two mechanically connected sidesticks are used for steering. It corresponds to the principle of cable steering. If the left hand pulls the lever backwards, the Twike 5 moves to the left. If the right hand pulls the lever, the Twike 5 moves to the right. The speed can be changed continuously on both levers of the steering system. Cruise control, controls for indicators, lights, windshield wipers and a scroll and select function for the screen are also integrated into the handles. A driving license for the old class B or the new class A1 is required for the vehicle.

==== Motor ====
The main drive is provided by a 70 kilowatt synchronous motor with reduction gearbox and rear-wheel drive. According to the manufacturer, the drive reaches a speed of up to 190 km/h in the largest battery configuration. Simulated acceleration from 0 to 100 km/h takes the vehicle a minimum of 3.8 seconds. Up to 20 percent at city speeds can be achieved by pedaling.

==== Power supply ====
The Twike 5 is available in two sizes. The lithium-ion battery modules vary between 18 and 36 kWh. In addition to a one-hour charge at a DC charging station, a discharged battery can also be charged within 10 hours using a household plug. In addition, braking energy is fed back into the battery during operation. The "Human Power Hybrid" concept provides for electricity to be generated through active pedaling and to flow directly into the battery.

==== Consumption and range ====
The company offers the TWIKE 5 model in two variants with different battery sizes. Although the same motor is installed in all models, the battery size influences the range and performance. The 18 kWh battery size has a range of over 250 km. With the 36 kWh variant, a range of over 500 km will be possible. The driver can increase the range manually using the built-in pedals.

== See also ==
- Cycle rickshaw
- List of motorized trikes
- Sinclair C5 – another three-wheeled pedal/battery vehicle
- Velomobile
