= The long tailpipe =

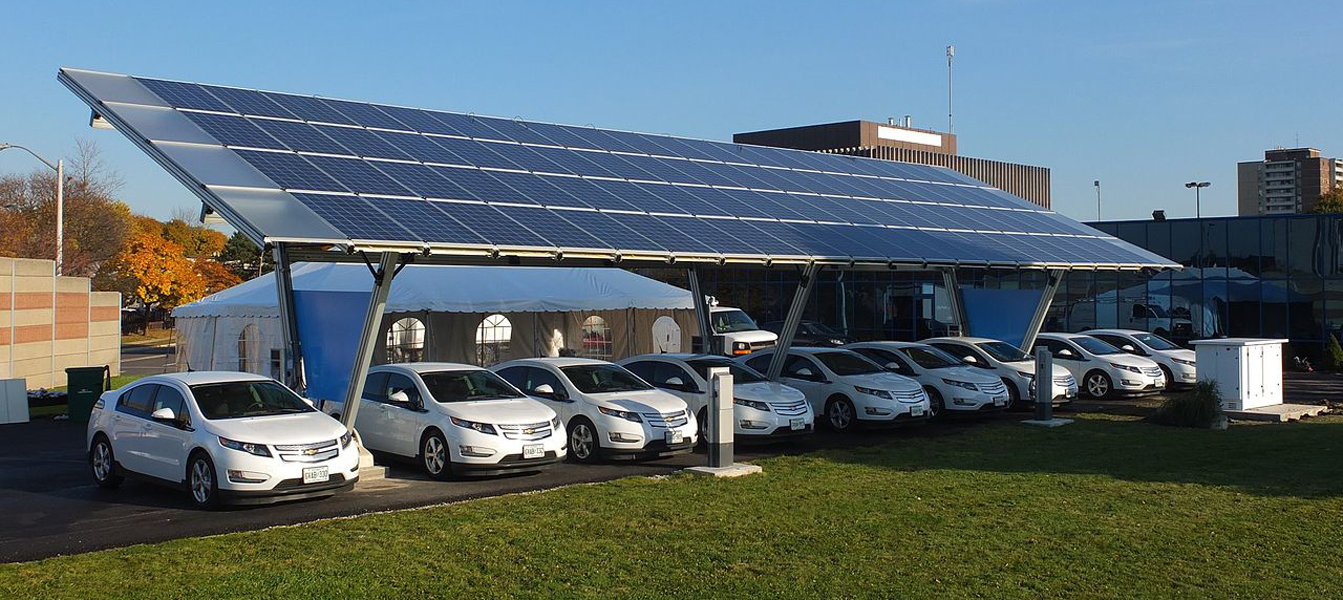
Chevrolet Volts charging at a solar-powered charging station in Toronto. The carbon footprint of plug-in electric vehicles depends on the fuel and technology used for electricity generation.

The long tailpipe is an argument stating that usage of electric vehicles does not always result in fewer emissions (e.g. greenhouse gas emissions) compared to those from non-electric vehicles. While the argument acknowledges that plug-in electric vehicles operating in all-electric mode have no greenhouse gas emissions from the onboard source of power, it claims that these emissions are shifted from the vehicle tailpipe to the location of the electrical generation plants. From the point of view of a well-to-wheel assessment, the extent of the actual carbon footprint depends on the fuel and technology used for electricity generation, as well as the impact of additional electricity demand on the phase-out of fossil fuel power plants.

== Description ==
Plug-in electric vehicles (PEVs) operating in all-electric mode do not emit greenhouse gases from the onboard source of power but emissions are shifted to the location of the generation plants. From the point of view of a well-to-wheel assessment, the extent of the actual carbon footprint depends on the fuel and technology used for electricity generation. From the perspective of a full life cycle analysis, the electricity used to recharge the batteries must be generated from renewable or clean sources such as wind, solar, hydroelectric, or nuclear power for PEVs to have almost none or zero well-to-wheel emissions. On the other hand, when PEVs are recharged from coal-fired plants, they usually produce slightly more greenhouse gas emissions than internal combustion engine vehicles and higher than hybrid electric vehicles.

Because plug-in electric vehicles do not produce emissions at the point of operation are often perceived as being environmentally friendlier than vehicles driven through internal combustion. Assessing the validity of that perception is difficult due to the greenhouse gases generated by the power plants that provide the electricity to charge the vehicles' batteries. For example, The New York Times reported that a Nissan Leaf driving in Los Angeles would have the same environmental impact as a gasoline-powered car with 79 mpg_{‑US} (3.0 L/100 km; 95 mpg_{‑imp}) compared to the same trip in Denver would only have the equivalent of 33 mpg_{‑US} (7.1 L/100 km; 40 mpg_{‑imp}). The U.S. Department of Energy published a concise description of the problem: "Electric vehicles (EVs) themselves emit no greenhouse gases (GHGs), but substantial emissions can be produced 'upstream' at the electric power plant."

A recent study by the German IfW shows that the increased electricity demand, and the resulting delay in the shutdown of coal-fired power plants in Germany, causes electric vehicles to have 73% higher CO_{2} emissions than Diesel vehicles.

== Carbon footprint in selected countries ==
A study published in the UK in April 2013 assessed the carbon footprint of plug-in electric vehicles in 20 countries. As a baseline the analysis established that manufacturing emissions account for 70 g CO_{2}/km. The study found that in countries with coal-intensive generation, PEVs are no different from conventional petrol-powered vehicles. Among these countries are China, Indonesia, Australia, South Africa and India. A pure electric car in India generates emissions comparable to a 20 mpg_{‑US} (12 L/100 km; 24 mpg_{‑imp}) petrol car. The country ranking was led by Paraguay, where all electricity is produced from hydropower, and Iceland, where electricity production relies on renewable power, mainly hydro and geothermal power. Resulting carbon emissions from an electric car in both countries are 70 g CO_{2}/km, which is equivalent to a 220 mpg_{‑US} (1.1 L/100 km; 260 mpg_{‑imp}) petrol car, and correspond to manufacturing emissions. Next in the ranking are other countries with similar low carbon electricity generation, including Sweden (mostly hydro and nuclear power ), Brazil (mainly hydropower) and France (predominantly nuclear power). Countries ranking in the middle include Japan, Germany, the UK and the United States.

The following table shows the emission intensity estimated in the study for each of the 20 countries, and the corresponding emissions equivalent in miles per US gallon of a petrol-powered car.

Note that changes since 2013 will make significant changes to the figures, for example the UK emission factor for electricity in 2013 was 0.44546 kg/kWh, by 2023 this had dropped to 0.207074 kg/kWh, about 46% of the 2013 figure, which would move the UK into the "Low carbon" section.

Country comparison of full life cycle assessment of greenhouse gas emissions resulting from charging plug-in electric cars and emissions equivalent in terms of miles per US gallon of a petrol-powered car
Country	PEV well-to-wheels carbon dioxide equivalent emissions per electric car expressed in (CO_{2}e/km)	Power source	PEV well-to-wheels emissions equivalent in terms of mpg US of petrol-powered car	Equivalent petrol car
Paraguay	70	Low carbon	218 mpg_{‑US} (1.08 L/100 km)	Hybrid multiples
Iceland	70	Low carbon	217 mpg_{‑US} (1.08 L/100 km)	Hybrid multiples
Sweden	81	Low carbon	159 mpg_{‑US} (1.48 L/100 km)	Hybrid multiples
Brazil	89	Low carbon	134 mpg_{‑US} (1.76 L/100 km)	Hybrid multiples
France	93	Low carbon	123 mpg_{‑US} (1.91 L/100 km)	Hybrid multiples
Canada	115	Fossil light	87 mpg_{‑US} (2.7 L/100 km)	Beyond hybrid
Spain	146	Fossil light	61 mpg_{‑US} (3.9 L/100 km)	Beyond hybrid
Russia	155	Fossil light	57 mpg_{‑US} (4.1 L/100 km)	Beyond hybrid
Italy	170	Broad mix	50 mpg_{‑US} (4.7 L/100 km)	New hybrid
Japan	175	Broad mix	48 mpg_{‑US} (4.9 L/100 km)	New hybrid
Germany	179	Broad mix	47 mpg_{‑US} (5.0 L/100 km)	New hybrid
United Kingdom	189	Broad mix	44 mpg_{‑US} (5.3 L/100 km)	New hybrid
United States	202	Fossil heavy	40 mpg_{‑US} (5.9 L/100 km)	Efficient petrol
Mexico	203	Fossil heavy	40 mpg_{‑US} (5.9 L/100 km)	Efficient petrol
Turkey	204	Fossil heavy	40 mpg_{‑US} (5.9 L/100 km)	Efficient petrol
China	258	Coal based	30 mpg_{‑US} (7.8 L/100 km)	Average petrol
Indonesia	270	Coal based	28 mpg_{‑US} (8.4 L/100 km)	Average petrol
Australia	292	Coal based	26 mpg_{‑US} (9.0 L/100 km)	Average petrol
South Africa	318	Coal based	24 mpg_{‑US} (9.8 L/100 km)	Average petrol
India	370	Coal based	20 mpg_{‑US} (12 L/100 km)	Average petrol
Note: Electric car manufacturing emissions account for 70 g CO_{2}/km; Source: Shades of Green: Electric Cars’ Carbon Emissions Around the Globe, Shrink That Footprint, February 2013.

== Carbon footprint in the United States ==
In the case of the United States, the Union of Concerned Scientists (UCS) conducted a study in 2012 to assess average greenhouse gas emissions resulting from charging plug-in car batteries from the perspective of the full life-cycle (well-to-wheel analysis) and according to fuel and technology used to generate electric power by region. The study used the Nissan Leaf all-electric car to establish the analysis baseline, and electric-utility emissions are based on EPA's 2007 estimates. The UCS study expressed the results in terms of miles per gallon instead of the conventional unit of grams of greenhouse gases or carbon dioxide equivalent emissions per year in order to make the results more friendly for consumers. The study found that in areas where electricity is generated from natural gas, nuclear, hydroelectric or renewable sources, the potential of plug-in electric cars to reduce greenhouse emissions is significant. On the other hand, in regions where a high proportion of power is generated from coal, hybrid electric cars produce less CO_{2} equivalent emissions than plug-in electric cars, and the best fuel efficient gasoline-powered subcompact car produces slightly less emissions than a PEV. In the worst-case scenario, the study estimated that for a region where all energy is generated from coal, a plug-in electric car would emit greenhouse gas emissions equivalent to a gasoline car rated at a combined city/highway driving fuel economy of 30 mpg_{‑US} (7.8 L/100 km; 36 mpg_{‑imp}). In contrast, in a region that is completely reliant on natural gas, the PEV would be equivalent to a gasoline-powered car rated at 50 mpg_{‑US} (4.7 L/100 km; 60 mpg_{‑imp}).

The following table shows a representative sample of cities within each of the three categories of emissions intensity used in the UCS study, showing the corresponding miles per gallon equivalent for each city as compared to the greenhouse gas emissions of a gasoline-powered car:

Regional comparison of full life cycle assessment of greenhouse gas emissions resulting from charging plug-in electric vehicles expressed in terms of miles per gallon of a gasoline-powered car with equivalent emissions
Rating scale by emissions intensity expressed as miles per gallon	City	PEV well-to-wheels carbon dioxide equivalent (CO_{2}e) emissions per year expressed as mpg US	Percent reduction in CO_{2}e emissions compared with 27 mpg US average new compact car	Combined EPA's rated fuel economy and GHG emissions for reference gasoline-powered car	
Best; Lowest CO_{2}e emissions equivalent to over50 mpg_{‑US} (4.7 L/100 km)	Juneau, Alaska	112 mpg_{‑US} (2.10 L/100 km)	315%	2012 Toyota Prius/Prius c 50 mpg_{‑US} (4.7 L/100 km)	
Best; Lowest CO_{2}e emissions equivalent to over50 mpg_{‑US} (4.7 L/100 km)	San Francisco	79 mpg_{‑US} (3.0 L/100 km)	193%	2012 Toyota Prius/Prius c 50 mpg_{‑US} (4.7 L/100 km)	
Best; Lowest CO_{2}e emissions equivalent to over50 mpg_{‑US} (4.7 L/100 km)	New York City	74 mpg_{‑US} (3.2 L/100 km)	174%	2012 Toyota Prius/Prius c 50 mpg_{‑US} (4.7 L/100 km)	
Best; Lowest CO_{2}e emissions equivalent to over50 mpg_{‑US} (4.7 L/100 km)	Portland, Oregon	73 mpg_{‑US} (3.2 L/100 km)	170%	Greenhouse gas emissions (grams/mile)	
Best; Lowest CO_{2}e emissions equivalent to over50 mpg_{‑US} (4.7 L/100 km)	Boston	67 mpg_{‑US} (3.5 L/100 km)	148%	Tailpipe CO_{2}	Upstream GHG
Best; Lowest CO_{2}e emissions equivalent to over50 mpg_{‑US} (4.7 L/100 km)	Washington, D.C.	58 mpg_{‑US} (4.1 L/100 km)	115%	178 g/mi (111 g/km)	44 g/mi (27 g/km)
Better; Moderate CO_{2}e emissions equivalent to between 41 mpg_{‑US} (5.7 L/100 km) to 50 mpg_{‑US} (4.7 L/100 km)	Phoenix, Arizona	48 mpg_{‑US} (4.9 L/100 km)	78%	2012 Honda Civic Hybrid; 44 mpg_{‑US} (5.3 L/100 km)	
Better; Moderate CO_{2}e emissions equivalent to between 41 mpg_{‑US} (5.7 L/100 km) to 50 mpg_{‑US} (4.7 L/100 km)	Miami	47 mpg_{‑US} (5.0 L/100 km)	74%	2012 Honda Civic Hybrid; 44 mpg_{‑US} (5.3 L/100 km)	
Better; Moderate CO_{2}e emissions equivalent to between 41 mpg_{‑US} (5.7 L/100 km) to 50 mpg_{‑US} (4.7 L/100 km)	Houston	46 mpg_{‑US} (5.1 L/100 km)	70%	Greenhouse gas emissions (grams/mile)	
Better; Moderate CO_{2}e emissions equivalent to between 41 mpg_{‑US} (5.7 L/100 km) to 50 mpg_{‑US} (4.7 L/100 km)	Columbus, Ohio	41 mpg_{‑US} (5.7 L/100 km)	52%	Tailpipe CO_{2}	Upstream GHG
Better; Moderate CO_{2}e emissions equivalent to between 41 mpg_{‑US} (5.7 L/100 km) to 50 mpg_{‑US} (4.7 L/100 km)	Atlanta	41 mpg_{‑US} (5.7 L/100 km)	52%	202 g/mi (125 g/km)	50 g/mi (31 g/km)
Good; Highest CO_{2}e emissions equivalent to between 31 mpg_{‑US} (7.6 L/100 km) to 40 mpg_{‑US} (5.9 L/100 km)	Detroit	38 mpg_{‑US} (6.2 L/100 km)	41%	2012 Chevrolet Cruze; 30 mpg_{‑US} (7.8 L/100 km)	
Good; Highest CO_{2}e emissions equivalent to between 31 mpg_{‑US} (7.6 L/100 km) to 40 mpg_{‑US} (5.9 L/100 km)	Des Moines, Iowa	37 mpg_{‑US} (6.4 L/100 km)	37%	2012 Chevrolet Cruze; 30 mpg_{‑US} (7.8 L/100 km)	
Good; Highest CO_{2}e emissions equivalent to between 31 mpg_{‑US} (7.6 L/100 km) to 40 mpg_{‑US} (5.9 L/100 km)	St. Louis, Missouri	36 mpg_{‑US} (6.5 L/100 km)	33%	Greenhouse gas emissions (grams/mile)	
Good; Highest CO_{2}e emissions equivalent to between 31 mpg_{‑US} (7.6 L/100 km) to 40 mpg_{‑US} (5.9 L/100 km)	Wichita, Kansas	35 mpg_{‑US} (6.7 L/100 km)	30%	Tailpipe CO_{2}	Upstream GHG
Good; Highest CO_{2}e emissions equivalent to between 31 mpg_{‑US} (7.6 L/100 km) to 40 mpg_{‑US} (5.9 L/100 km)	Denver	33 mpg_{‑US} (7.1 L/100 km)	22%	296 g/mi (184 g/km)	73 g/mi (45 g/km)
Source: Union of Concerned Scientists, 2012. Notes: The Nissan Leaf is the baseline car for the assessment, with an energy consumption rated by EPA at 34 kWh/100 mi or 99 miles per gallon gasoline equivalent (2.4 L/100 km) combined. The ratings are based on a region's mix of electricity sources and its average emissions intensity over the course of a year. In practice the electricity grid is very dynamic, with the mix of power plants constantly changing in response to hourly, daily and seasonal electricity demand, and availability of electricity resources.

An analysis of EPA power plant data from 2016 showed improvement in mpg-equivalent ratings of electric cars for nearly all regions, with a national weighted average of 80 mpg for electric vehicles. The regions with the highest ratings include upstate New York, New England, and California at over 100 mpg, while only Oahu, Wisconsin, and part of Illinois and Missouri are below 40 mpg, though still higher than nearly all gasoline cars.

This information has been updated in 2025 by the ICCT, an international, independent non-profit research organization. In 2025, in most major cities, battery powered electric vehicles in normal operation use 25% or even less of the internal combustion engine. According to the ICCT, battery powered electric vehicles use about 70% less energy than internal combustion engine vehicles.

== Criticism ==
The long tailpipe has been the target of criticism, ranging from claims that many estimates are methodologically flawed to estimates that state that electricity generation in the United States will become less carbon-intensive over time. Tesla Motors CEO Elon Musk published his own criticism of the long tailpipe. The extraction and refining of carbon based fuels and its distribution is in itself an energy intensive industry contributing to CO_{2} emissions. In 2007 U.S. refineries consumed 39353 million kWh, 70769 million lbs of steam and 697593 million cubic feet of Natural Gas. And the refining energy efficiency for gasoline is estimated to be, at best, 87.7%.
