= Human–electric hybrid vehicle =

Vehicle type

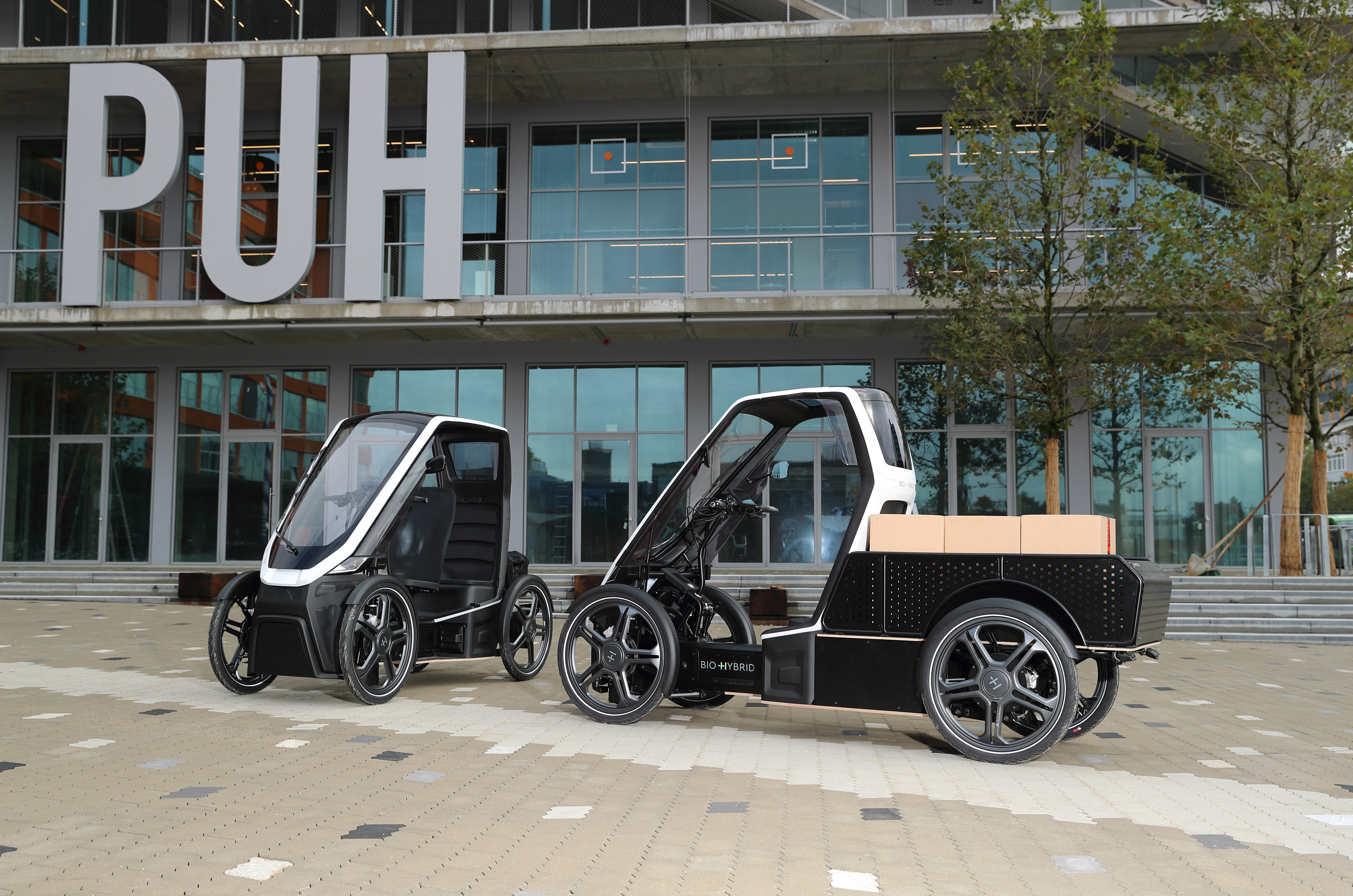
HEHV

A human–electric hybrid vehicle is a hybrid vehicle, or more specifically a hybrid human-powered vehicle, whose drivetrain consists of a human being and an electric motor/generator (and one or more electricity-storage device(s) such as a battery(ies) or ultracapacitor(s)). Some vehicles are able to operate off both human power and be plugged in to operate on battery power.

It can have characteristics of a bicycle, velomobile or other lightweight human operated vehicles with the addition of faster acceleration and regenerative braking, allowing a higher average velocity, especially in hilly terrain.

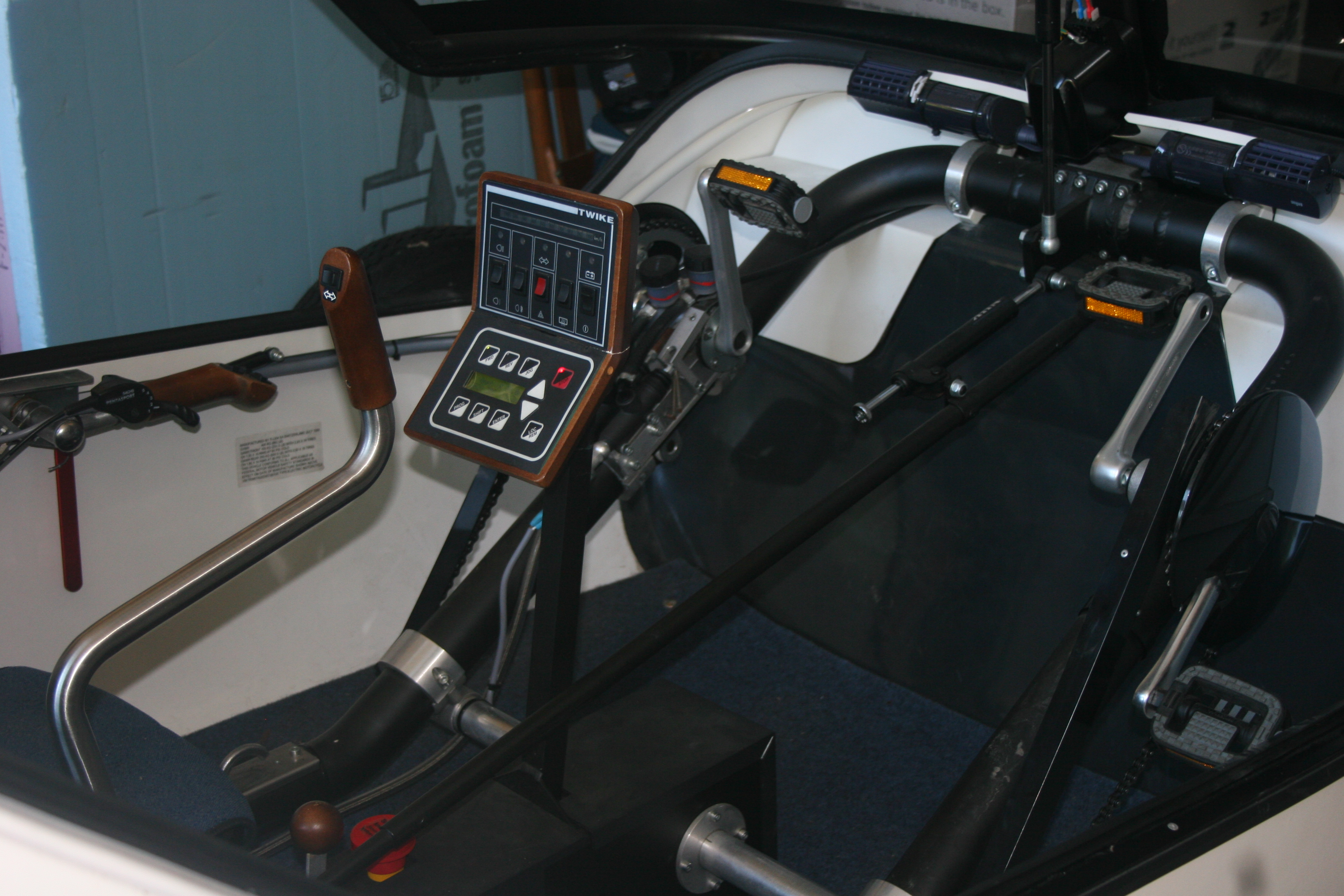
Interior of a 1998 Twike HEHV

Some vehicles have a clutch and three or more wheels, allowing the operator to continue pedaling and charge up the electricity-storage device during traffic stops.

== See also ==
- Pedelec – Bicycle where the rider's pedalling is assisted by an electric motor
- Velomobile – Human-powered vehicle
  - Quadracycle – Four-wheeled vehicle with pedals
    - Velocar – Historical velomobile
  - Twike – German electric vehicle manufacturer
- Quadricycle – Small motorized four wheeled vehicle
  - Motorized quadricycle – EU vehicle category for four-wheeled microcars (Microcar – Smallest automobile classification)
