= Fuel gas-powered scooter =

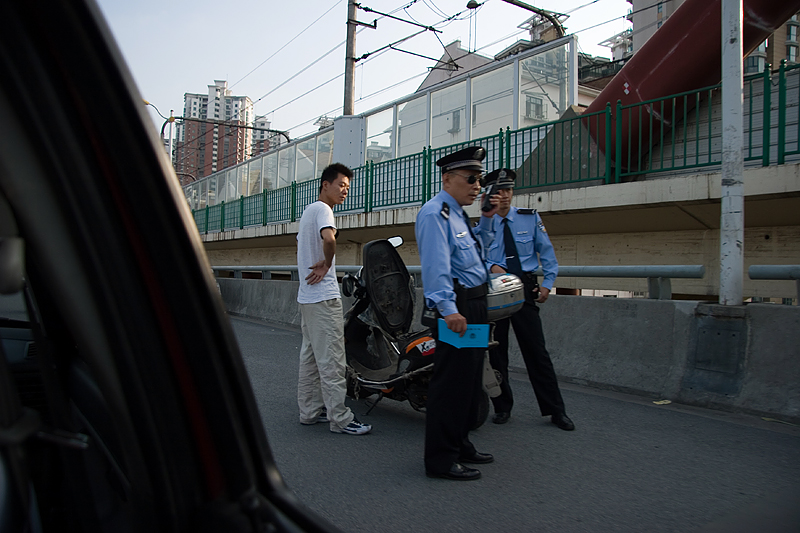
Police checking a scooter in Shanghai. Sometimes phony LPG tanks are attached to scooters to skirt the law against petrol engines.

A fuel gas-powered scooter is a scooter powered by fuel gas. Fuel gases include such fuels such as liquefied petroleum gas (LPG), compressed natural gas (CNG), biogas and hydrogen (HICE). Hydrogen (hydrogen internal combustion) use in two-wheelers has only recently being started to be looked into, mainly by developing countries, to decrease local pollution at an affordable cost.

== Geographical use of fuel-gas scooters and related vehicles ==
LPG scooters are in use in China and many parts of Southern Asia.

== Incentives for using fuel gas in scooters ==
=== Fuel costs ===
Each different fuel comes at a different price. These prices depend on the country, and even differ between gas stations. Scooter owners may decide to use whatever fuel that is cheapest and which is also locally available.

=== Petrol bans in cities ===
Shanghai has banned petrol scooters/mopeds and only allows LPG scooters to be used in the city due to air pollution. About 190,000 gasoline mopeds were eliminated between 2001 and 2004, replaced by 140,000 LPG mopeds as of 2004, at which time the city had over 100 LPG refueling stations. In 1996 the city's 500,000 gasoline mopeds were blamed for one fifth of the air pollution in Shanghai, so in 1997 the city stopped issuing new license plates for them. In 2000, the city stopped renewing plates for existing gasoline mopeds, so all of them expired by 2008.

=== Low emission zones in cities ===
Low emission zones are present in many cities. Fuel gases such as hydrogen, CNG, LPG, ... may allow for reaching the appropriate limit to enter the city in which such LEZ's are present (depending on which European emission standard or US emission standard is being used in the LEZ).

== Conversion kits for petrol scooters ==
Petrol-powered scooters can be fitted with a conversion kit. Conversion kits for CNG for example exist for some popular motorcycle models.

== See also ==
- Alternative fuel vehicle
- CNG auto rickshaw
- European emission standards
- Emissions levels of scooters
- Formic acid vehicle: a type of hydrogen-based vehicle
- Emission levels of hydrogen in HICEV's
- International Centre for Hydrogen Energy Technologies
- United States emission standards
