= Mobility transition =

Change in transport planning and policy

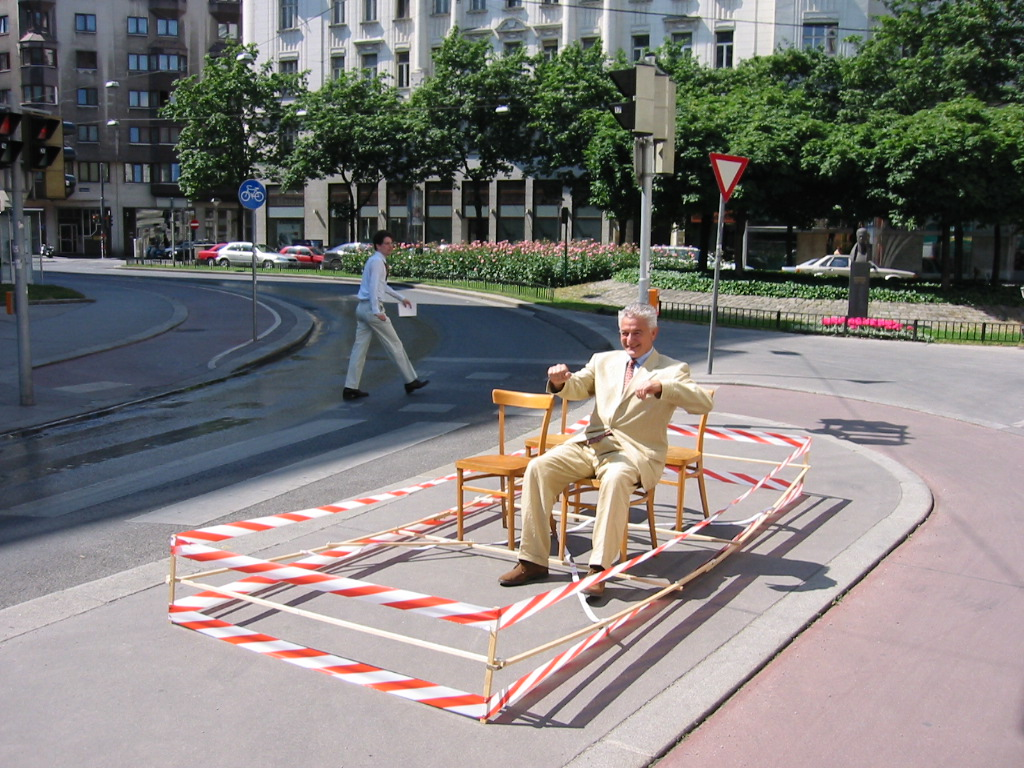
Hermann Knoflacher has been criticising auto cities and car dependency for decades. With his walkmobile, he caricatures the enormous spatial demands of motorised private transport (2007).

Mobility transition is a set of social, technological and political processes of converting traffic (including freight transport) and mobility to sustainable transport with renewable energy resources, and an integration of several different modes of private transport and local public transport. It also includes social change, a redistribution of public spaces, and different ways of financing and spending money in urban planning. The main motivation for mobility transition is the reduction of the harm and damage that traffic causes to people (mostly but not solely due to collisions) and the environment (which also often directly or indirectly affects people) in order to make (urban) society more livable, as well as solving various interconnected logistical, social, economic and energy issues and inefficiencies.

Mobility went through many transitions in the 19th and 20th centuries. Canal boats, Steam railways and bicycles largely replaced journeys afoot and by horse, and steamships replaced sailing ships. Each later changed to internal combustion engines and, in the case of many railways, electricity. They in turn were partly replaced by automobile transport and aviation.

== Motivation ==
=== Environmental damage ===
An important goal is the reduction of greenhouse gas emissions such as CO_{2}. To achieve the goal set in the Paris Agreement, that is, to restrict global warming to clearly below 2 °C, the burning of fossil fuels is to be discontinued around 2040. Because the CO_{2} emissions of traffic practically need to be reduced to zero, the measures taken so far in the transport sector are not sufficient in order to achieve the climate change mitigation goals that have been set.

=== Air pollution ===
A mobility transition also serves health purposes in the metropolitan regions and large cities and is intended in particular to counteract the massive air pollution. For example, in Germany in 2015, traffic caused about 38% of human-related nitrogen oxide emissions. According to Lelieveld et al. (2015), air pollution from land traffic alone killed around 164,000 people in 2010; in Germany alone, it was over 6,900 people. A 2017 study by the same lead author concluded that air pollution from road traffic in Germany causes 11,000 deaths every year that could potentially be avoided. This figure is 3.5 times the number of fatalities from accidents.

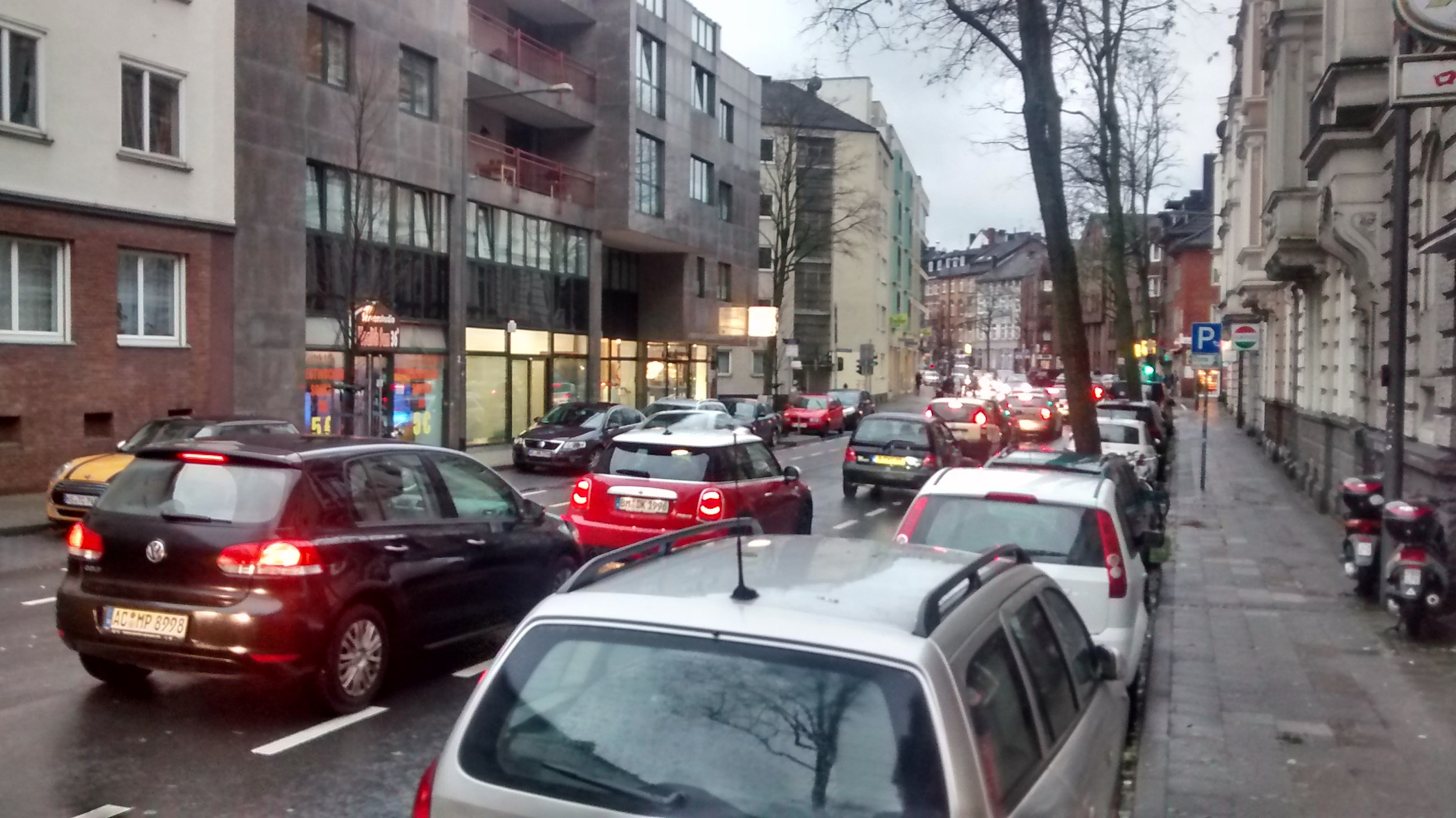
Classic urban mobility using the example of Aachen: privately owned automobiles characterise the streetscape.

To demonstrate how much road traffic contributes to air pollution in Germany, for every 100 inhabitants, 58 of them owned passenger cars, according to Federal Statistical Office of Germany.

=== Accident fatalities, quality of life, aggressive behaviour ===
Further motives for the mobility transition are the desire for less noise, streets with quality of life and lower accident risks (see also Vision Zero). According to estimates by the European Environment Agency, 113 million people in Europe are affected by road noise at unhealthy levels. With increasing traffic and commuter numbers, many citizens also wished for more attractive places to spend time in public spaces. A mobility transition therefore also serves to increase the quality of life.

The mobility transition is also seen by some as a means of reducing aggressive behaviour in traffic (road rage) and in society. Studies indicate that people in large and expensive cars are more likely to behave recklessly. According to the German Verkehrsklima 2020 (Traffic Mood 2020) study, women feel more insecure in traffic than men, and they want more controls and stricter laws. On the other hand, the "evil eye" design of vehicles is increasingly used by manufacturers to sell vehicles to drivers who want to feel strong and superior on the road. Accident reporting by the press and the police sometimes paints a distorted picture.

=== Traffic congestion ===
Traffic congestion has been increasing in streets and roads. Traditional traffic policy usually relies on expanding the roads to solve the congestion problem. Worldwide, the main causes are urbanisation and the purchase of more automobiles as prosperity increases. A return to more public and non-motorised transport is likely in the future.

=== Peak oil ===
Petroleum production is approaching its peak, or by some estimates may already have been passed in the 2020s. The Earth's oil reserves are finite, and oil extraction will become inadequate to power as many petroleum-fueled vehicles. Researchers have proposed changing to transport that uses less fuel.

== Mobility transition concept ==
=== Origins ===
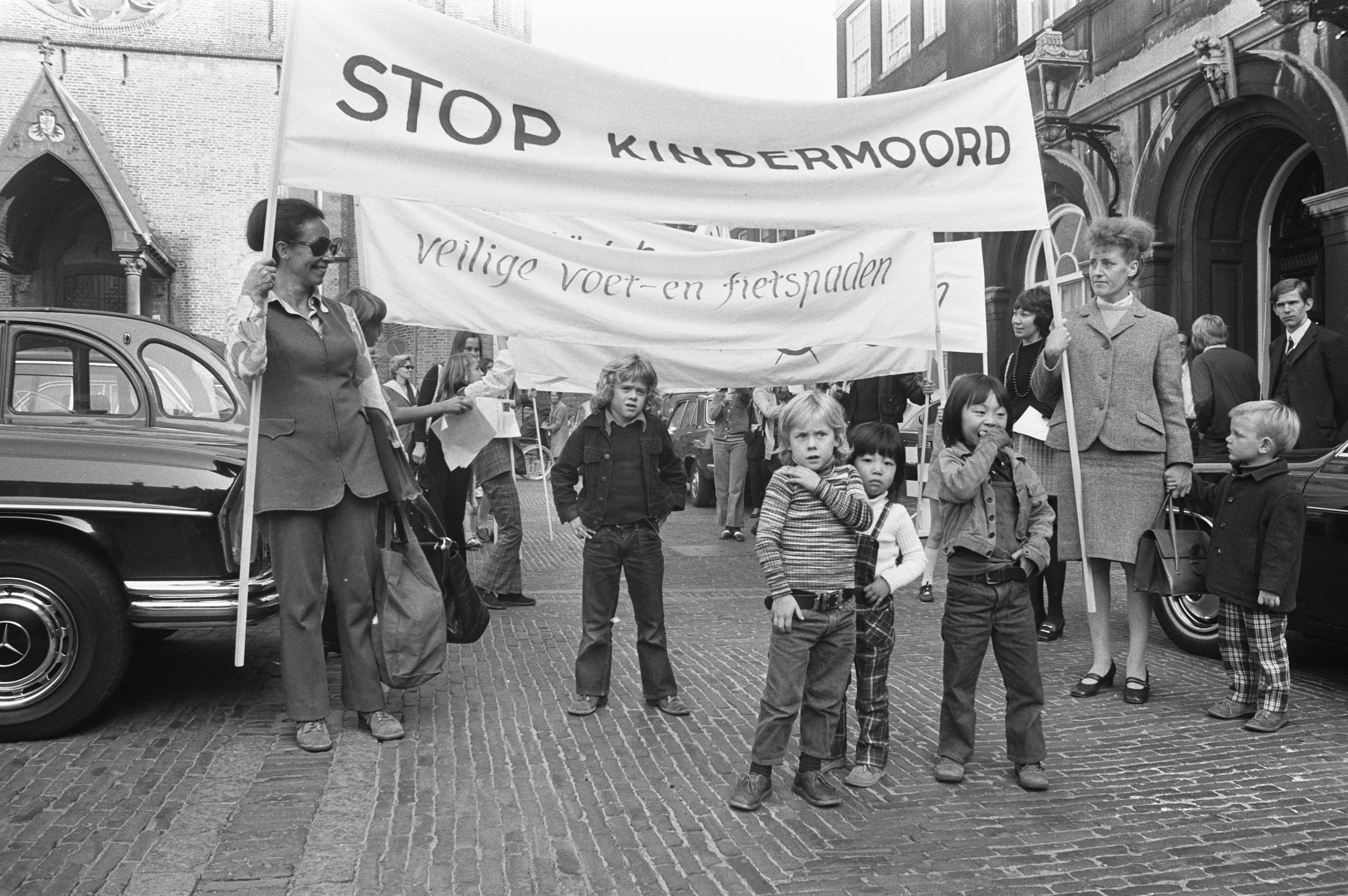
Action group "Stop the Child Murder" protesting in front of the Dutch Parliament in 1972. The banners state "Stop child murder" and "Safe walking and cycling paths".

There has been criticism of automotive cities and car dependency since at least the 1960s. In the Netherlands, Provo Luud Schimmelpennink's 1965 White Bicycle Plan was an early attempt to stop the rising death toll due to car-related traffic accidents, and to stimulate cycling as a safer and healthier alternative for short-distance travel in the city of Amsterdam. Although the plan itself was a complete failure, it drew widespread publicity and influenced urban planning ideas around the world – with the white bicycle becoming 'an almost mythical worldwide symbol for a better world'. It inspired the emergence of both strongly anti-car movements such as Kabouter (Gnome), Amsterdam Autovrij ("Amsterdam Car-Free") and De Lastige Amsterdammer ("The Troubled/Troublesome Amsterdammer"), as well as pro-cycling movements in Amsterdam and elsewhere in the Netherlands in the early 1970s.

A prominent example was protest group Stop de Kindermoord ("Stop the Child Murder"), founded in 1972 (formalised in 1973) by a journalist from Eindhoven whose young daughter was killed in a traffic accident, and shortly thereafter another daughter of his was almost killed as well. The movement highlighted how lethally dangerous traffic had become for children in particular, and that the authorities had failed to acknowledge and address the problem. It mobilised parents, teachers, journalists, other citizens and politicians; even right-wing politicians, who had traditionally promoted automobile interests, were influenced by the campaign and became more willing to adopt preventive measures. In Autokind vs Mankind (1971) and On the Nature of Cities (1979), American author Kenneth R. Schneider vehemently criticised the excesses of automobile dependence and called for a struggle to halt and partially reverse negative developments in transportation, although he was largely ignored at the time.

An early theorist on mobility transitions was American cultural geographer Wilbur Zelinsky, whose 1971 paper "The Hypothesis of the Mobility Transition" formed the basis of what has become known as the Zelinsky Model. In 1975, Austrian civil engineer and transportation planner Hermann Knoflacher sought to promote cycling traffic in Vienna. He caricatured the enormous spatial demands of automobiles with his self-invented Gehzeug ("walking gear/vehicle").

=== Definitions and scope ===
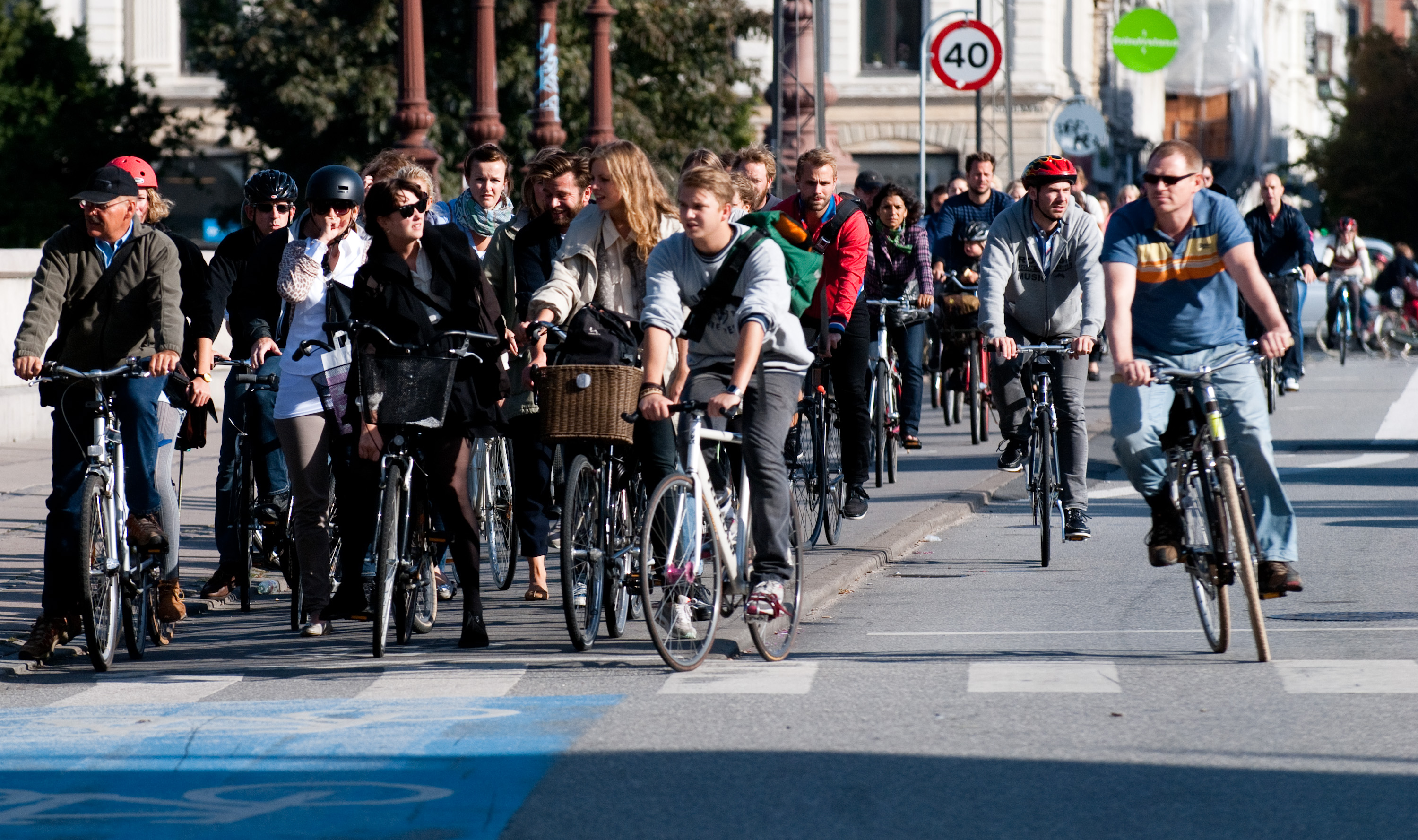
Cycling in Copenhagen also means organising commuter traffic by bike. 45 per cent of the population commutes by bicycle.

The German dictionary Duden defines 'mobility transition' (German: Verkehrswende) as "fundamental conversion of public transport [especially with ecological objectives]" (German: „grundlegende Umstellung des öffentlichen Verkehrs [besonders mit ökologischen Zielvorstellungen]"). Adey et al. (2021) defined 'mobility transition' as 'the necessary and inevitable transformation from a world in which mobility is dominated by the use of fossil fuels, the production of greenhouse gases and the dominance of automobility to one in which mobility entails reduced or eliminated fossil fuels and GHG emissions and is less dependent on the automobile.'

According to a 2016 thesis paper by Agora Verkehrswende – a joint initiative of Stiftung Mercator and the European Climate Foundation – the goal of a traffic transition (Verkehrswende) in Germany is ensuring climate neutrality in transport by 2050. It must be based on two pillars:

1. Mobility transition (Mobilitätswende): The goal is a significant reduction of energy consumption. The mobility transition is intended to bring about a qualitative change in traffic behaviour (Verkehrsverhalten), in particular avoiding and relocating traffic. An efficient design of the traffic systems without restricting mobility should be achieved.
2. Energy transition in traffic (Energiewende im Verkehr, see also phase-out of fossil fuel vehicles): In order to decarbonise traffic, the conversion of the energy supply of traffic towards renewable energy is considered a necessity.

A mobility transition also includes a cultural change, in particular a re-evaluation of "the street". Currently, the primary purpose of streets is to direct traffic through the city with as little disruption as possible. In the future, the dominance of the car should give way to equal rights for all modes of transport.

In an expanded definition, the mobility transition is distinguished from a pure propulsion transition on the one hand to a fundamental mobility transition on the other:

1. Propulsion transition (Antriebswende): the gradual replacement of internal combustion engines by those powered by hydrogen, fuel cells or battery-electric power.
2. Traffic transition (Verkehrswende): private car traffic is reduced or replaced by other modes of transportation. In the large cities and metropolitan regions in particular, the focus is increasingly on establishing and spreading alternative means of transport - from the expansion of public transport to the promotion of so-called active transport (pedestrian and bicycle traffic), the approval of new electrified micro-vehicles such as e-scooters and the range of different mobility services (the so-called MaaS, "mobility as a service").
3. Mobility transition (Mobilitätswende): This perspective takes into account not only the distances travelled and the means of transport used for them, but also the socio-economic, cultural and spatial dynamics and constraints that cause the need to overcome distances. These include, for example, settlement and transport policies, housing and labour markets, social policy and migration. The need to quickly overcome distances is not understood as an invariant characteristic of people, but as part and prerequisite of the current, growth-oriented capitalist shape of society.

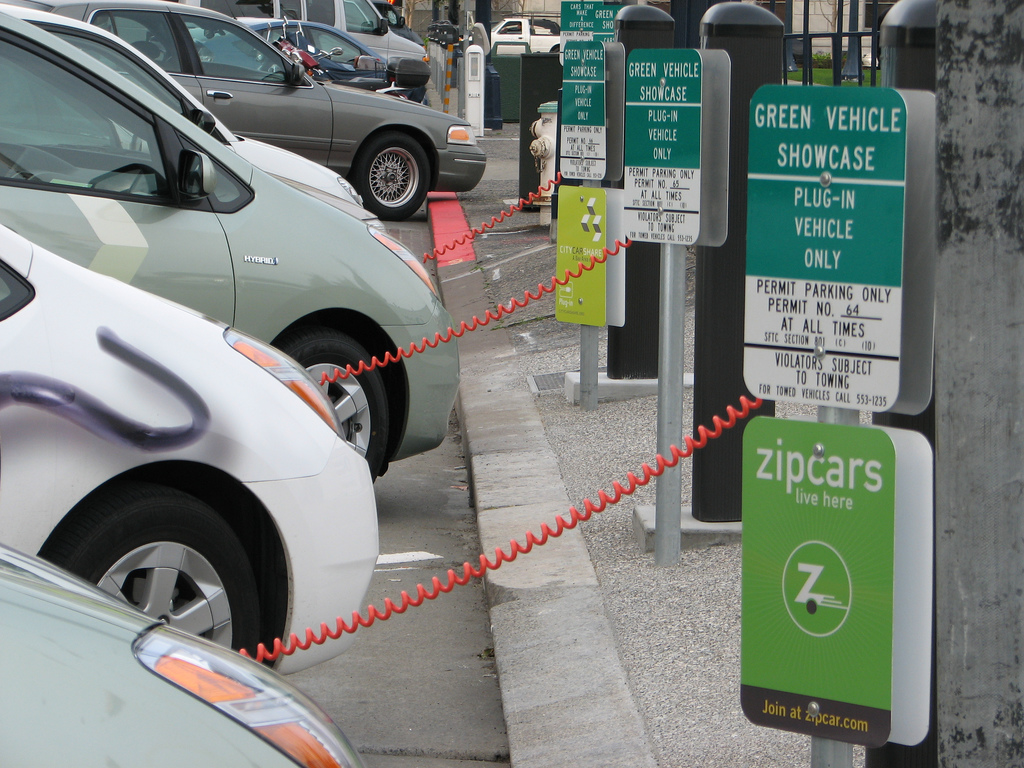
Electric cars in a carsharing as part of mixed-mode commuting (San Francisco City Hall 2009)

In some cases, a mobility transition is also presented as a paradigm shift of the 'understanding of ownership'. Collective use of means of transport makes it possible to use modes of transportation 'adapted to specific needs', such as carsharing, peer-to-peer carsharing, bicycle-sharing systems. It also enables connecting different modes of transportation to one another on a route to be travelled. Electromobiles could better exploit their advantages in networking with other means of transport. Electric vehicles adapted to the respective uses can be small or large depending on the application, and do not (always) have to be designed for long distances. A suitable charging infrastructure is required. Under certain circumstances, in such an environment it will no longer be necessary to own private transport for one's own use.

In Germany, the mobility transition can be contrasted to the Bundesverkehrswegeplan 2030 ('Federal Transport Routes Plan 2030'). The mobility transition is based on avoiding traffic and shifting to rail, but the Bundesverkehrswegeplan is based on the construction and expansion of trunk roads in Germany (including but not limited to the Autobahn). Transport scientist Heiner Monheim regards the transition as a "turning away from car subsidies through billions [of euros] in road network expansion". He sees a decisive change in the priorities of transport policy as a necessary condition to achieve this.

The Umweltbundesamt announced that in 2018, the sum of all environmentally harmful subsidies in Germany was 65.4 billion euros, almost half of them in the areas of traffic and transport. In traffic, such subsidies with harmful effects even increased from 2012 to 2018.

=== Changes in behaviour due to the COVID-19 pandemic ===
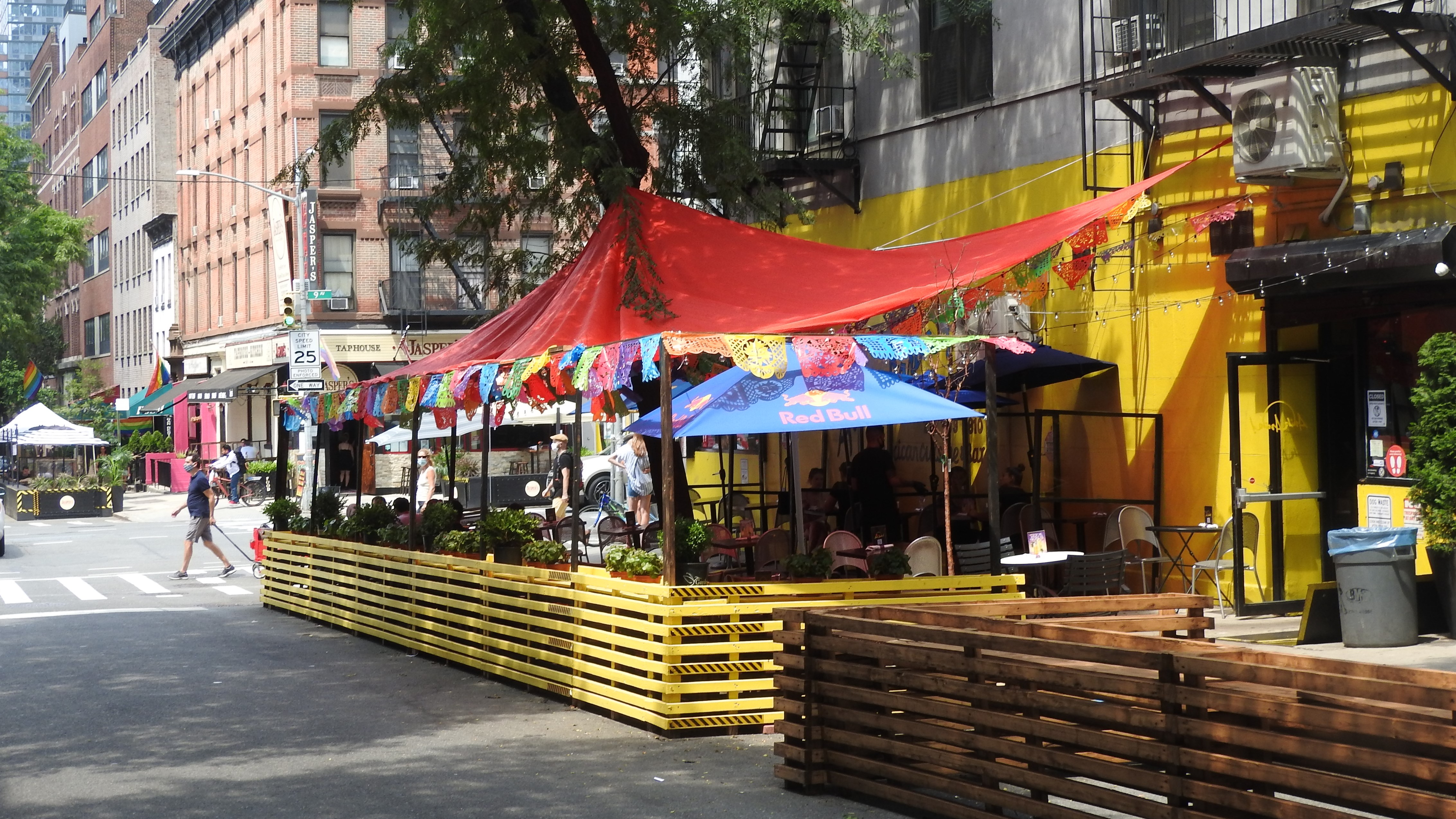
During the pandemic, the efficiency of urban land use has been reconsidered. (Temporary) outdoor areas for restaurants are sometimes more economical than parking spaces, and enhance the cityscape.

The COVID-19 pandemic made it clear that work and transport can be organised differently, even in a comparatively short time. An increased focus on working from home could save millions of tonnes of greenhouse gases.

== Measures in passenger transport ==
=== Overview ===
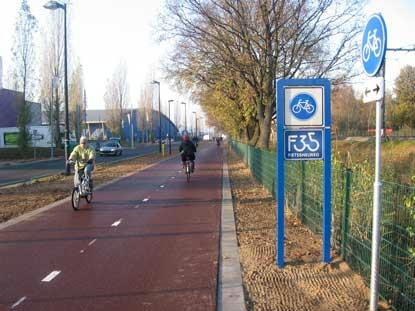
Bike freeway F35 in the Netherlands (Enschede)

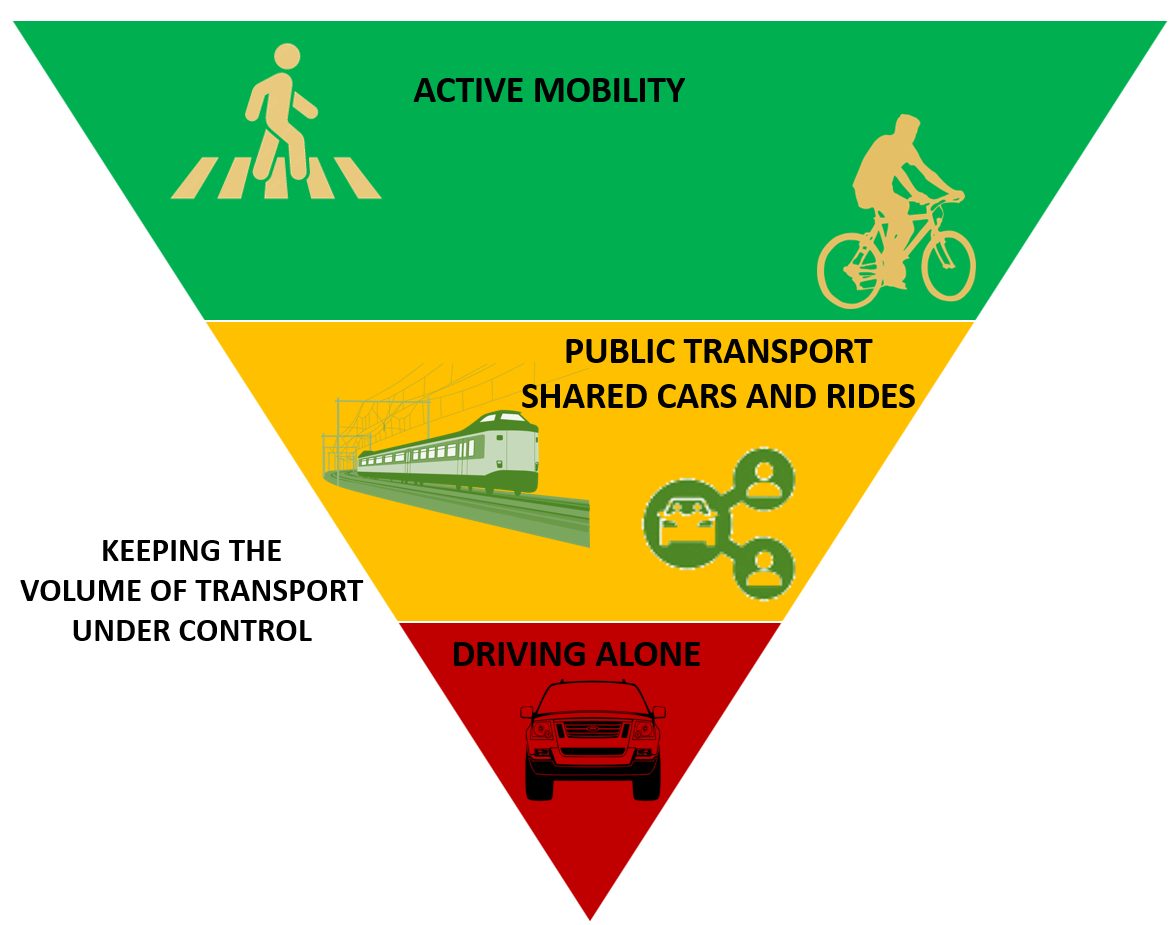
Mobility pyramid

Various measures have been proposed by different people and groups to achieve a mobility transition.

In a 2017 position paper, German think tank Agora Verkehrswende described how a climate-neutral conversion of transport would be possible by 2050 without sacrificing mobility. In addition to technological innovations, there are new traffic concepts, regulatory measures and cultural change. Multi-link transport chains (Intermodal passenger transport) are considered. Amongst other things, there were also studies on this in November 2019 by the Verkehrsclub Deutschland (VCD, "Traffic Club Germany") and the Heinrich Böll Foundation.

=== Mobility transition ===
Various measures have been proposed to achieve the mobility transition – in particular a significant reduction in energy requirements and a change in traffic behaviour:

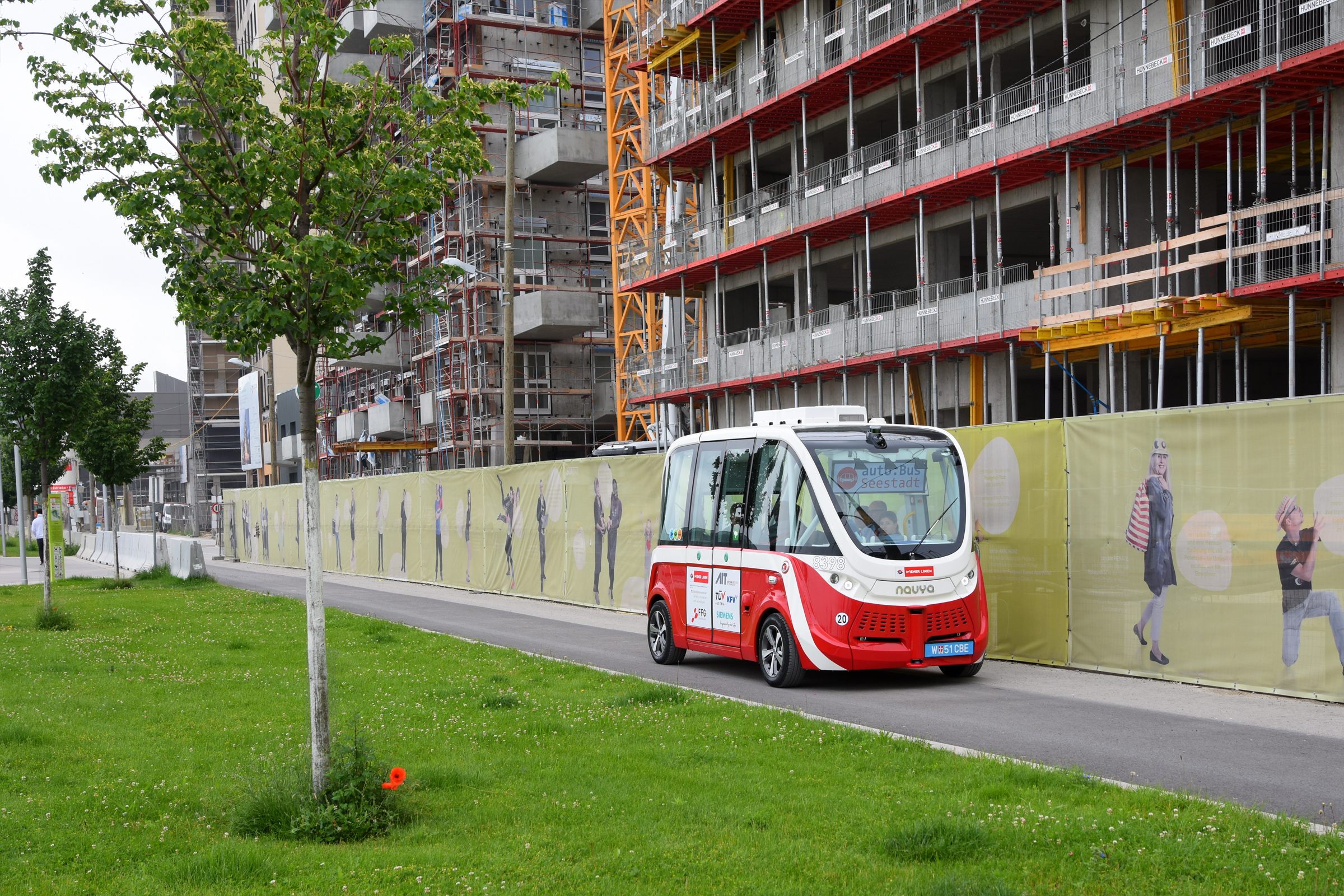
The Autonomous Bus Vienna (2019–2021) was an experimental company for self-driving buses.

Major changes can succeed with the help of traffic avoidance, and a shift towards sustainable transport in the form of pedestrian traffic, cycling, rail transport and local public transport. According to a 2010 report, each person in Germany in 2008 conducted an average of 3.4 trips a day, with an average length of 11.5 kilometres. On average, private cars were parked for around 22,5 hours a day, because they were used for only 1 hour and 19 to 28 minutes a day. Electric cars with a short range, bicycles, electric bicycles (e-bikes), pedelecs, cargo bikes, but also recently e-scooters, are usually well suited for a majority of these routes. The joint use of automobiles in carsharing could increase the utilisation of the vehicles and lead to fewer cars being needed overall. This could also reduce the land consumption of parking spaces and free up space for other uses. In 2002 and 2008, vehicles in Germany were occupied by an average of 1.5 people. One method of efficient use of passenger cars is the formation of carpools and the operation of ridesharing companies. Needs-based use of various sorts of low emission vehicles can also serve to reduce fuel consumption. The latter measures would lead to an increase in energy and vehicle efficiency. Another component in the future mobility mix could be Neighborhood Electric Vehicles.

Numerous regulatory control measures are possible, for example congestion charges, aviation taxation and subsidies (such as a jet fuel tax and a departure tax), a reform of company car taxation, parking space management (for example through pay and display), or an extension of emissions trading to road traffic. The introduction of speed limits, or lowering existing speed limits, would also have an impact on greenhouse gas emissions such as CO_{2} (carbon dioxide) and NO_{x} (nitric oxide and nitrogen dioxide). Passenger cars consume a disproportionately large amount of fuel at high speeds. A speed limit can also have secondary emissions-reducing effects, about which there is still considerable uncertainty: lower maximum speeds and longer travel times can contribute to a shift in traffic to rail and to the promotion of vehicles with lower engine power. The externalities of traffic, namely the impact that air pollution caused by motor vehicles has on society and the environment, must also be taken into account here.

The 2019 Dutch nitrogen emissions crisis, which indirectly caused the Dutch farmers' protests, convinced the government in November 2019 to lower the speed limits in the Netherlands on national roads to 100 kilometres per hour during the day, from 6 am to 7 pm. In the evening and at night the old speeds were maintained. Meanwhile, the State of the Netherlands v. Urgenda Foundation court case was decided in favour of its plaintiff Urgenda (initially in June 2015, upheld on appeal in October 2018, and finally confirmed by the Supreme Court of the Netherlands on 20 December 2019), who successfully forced the government to implement the necessary measures to reduce the Netherlands' CO_{2} emissions from 1990 levels by 25% by 2020. Although the government was free to choose which measures it would take to achieve this reduction, the plaintiff and other environmentalists had been suggesting throughout the legal process to lower the speed limit as one of several effective options to do so. Similar environmental arguments for speed limits have been proposed in Germany.

As one of several methods to mitigate the environmental impact of aviation, a shift to other modes of transport or a switch from short-haul air traffic to high-speed trains has been proposed. In several countries in Europe, increasingly in the 2010s and early 2020s, some governments have even imposed a short-haul flight ban on all airlines, while many governmental agencies, commercial companies, universities, and NGOs have imposed restrictions or prohibitions on their employees to not take short-haul flights that can also be properly accomplished by train.

In the field of urban planning, there are concepts for walkability, the compact city (or 'city of short distances'), New Urbanism (or its variant New Pedestrianism), and car-free living. In research policy, there are demands to give more consideration to the consequences of motorised private transport in the form of practice-oriented and solution-oriented research.

=== Further development of local public transport ===
According to a 2015 study by the Verkehrsclub Deutschland, local public transport in Germany was not customer-friendly enough. Cryptic route networks, opaque fare systems, ticket machines that cannot be operated, drafty bus stops, and a lack of announcements about transfer and connection options were criticised. The club also called for better linking of local public transport with other modes of transportation. This included bike racks at bus stops, information on taking bikes on buses and trains, and options for switching to carsharing providers. Furthermore, the synchronisation of timetables was criticised, because it led to unnecessarily long waiting times for connecting buses or trains. In 2012, several local public transport companies reportedly had been making efforts to improve the usability of ticket machines in Bavaria and Saxony. Against this background, Federal Transport Minister Alexander Dobrindt in 2017 called for electronic tickets and a uniform tariff system for all transport associations to be established by 2019.

Since the 2010s, there have been frequent discussions on whether local public transport should be free of charge. The best-known example of free public transport is the Estonian capital Tallinn, where buses and trains have been free since 2013. By 2021, most counties in Estonia had also introduced free buses and trains. Public transport is also free throughout Luxembourg. In Germany, the cities of Monheim am Rhein and Langenfeld, Rhineland were testing free public transport as of September 2021.

Some cities have introduced mini electric buses, primarily in inner-city areas. The historic city centre of Aix-en-Provence, France is very narrow and closed to cars, taxis and normal bus traffic. In order to get people with restricted mobility to their destination, wheelchair-accessible electric minibuses are frequented there without a fixed timetable. Likewise, in the medieval old town of Regensburg, only mini-ebuses are still driving around. Furthermore, two self-propelled e-shuttles are in use in Regensburg's industrial park. Berlin and Göppingen also want to supplement their local public transport with electric, highly automated minibuses.

In some cities, cableways are built as part of local public transit. Such cableways can be found in places such as Medellín (see Metrocable (Medellín)), La Paz (see Mi Teleférico), New York (see Roosevelt Island Tramway), Portland (see Portland Aerial Tram), Algiers (see Cableways of Algiers), Lisbon (see Funiculars in Lisbon), Brest (see Cableways of Brest), Bozen, London (see Emirates Air Line (cable car)) and Ankara. Cable cars are electrically operated and they have very low CO_{2} emissions compared to other modes of transport. At 50% capacity, a cable car causes 27 grams of CO_{2} per person and kilometre, a train with an electric locomotive 30 grams, a bus with a diesel engine 38.5 grams, and a car with a combustion engine even 248 grams. Furthermore, cable cars cause practically no noise pollution on the route, since the individual gondolas do not have their own drive, but are moved by a central motor housed in the station. In Germany, on the occasion of the Bundesgartenschau ('Federal Horticultural Show'), cable cars have emerged in Berlin (see IGA Cable Car), Koblenz (see Koblenz cable car) and Cologne (see Cologne Cable Car). Compared to underground or suburban trains, cable cars are relatively cheap and can be built quickly. As of November 2021, there are projects to build more cable cars to supplement local public transit in Berlin, Bonn, Düsseldorf, Cologne, Munich, Stuttgart and Wuppertal.

Continuous development is also affecting the rural areas as well. As a solution, what came into play was the integrated systems of public transport that is playing an important role in the development of rural areas, especially in post-communist countries.

=== Propulsion and energy transition in transport ===
In order to achieve the energy transition in transport, it is considered necessary to refrain from burning petroleum-based fuel and to use more climate-friendly propulsion technologies or fuels. Electricity from renewable sources, or e-fuels or biofuels produced from green electricity, can serve as substitutes for petrol and diesel fuel.

Since the overall efficiency of e-fuels is far lower than direct electrification via electric cars, the German Advisory Council on the Environment has recommended restricting the use of electricity-based synthetic fuels to air and shipping traffic in particular, in order not to increase electricity consumption too much. For example, hydrogen-powered fuel cell vehicles (FCVs) require more than twice as much energy per kilometre as battery electric vehicles (BEVs), and vehicles with combustion engines powered by power-to-liquid fuels even need between four and six times as much. Battery vehicles therefore have significantly better energy efficiency than vehicles that are operated with e-fuels. In general, electric cars consume around 12 to 15 kWh of electrical energy per 100 km, while conventionally powered cars use the equivalent of around 50 kWh per 100 km. At the same time, the energy required for the production, transport and distribution of fuels such as petrol or diesel is also eliminated. In China in particular, the switch from internal combustion engines to electromobility is being promoted for health reasons (to avoid smog) in order to counteract the massive air pollution in the cities.

According to Canzler & Wittowsky (2016), the propulsion transition could also become the central building block of Germany's Energiewende, While the switch to renewable energies is already underway worldwide, the energy transition in transport is proving more difficult, especially with the switch from oil to sustainable energy sources. However, disruptive technologies (such as the development of more powerful and cheaper batteries or innovations in the field of autonomous driving) and new business models (especially in the field of digitalisation) can also lead to unpredictable, rapid and far-reaching changes in mobility.

New methods of getting around in urban traffic have also emerged:

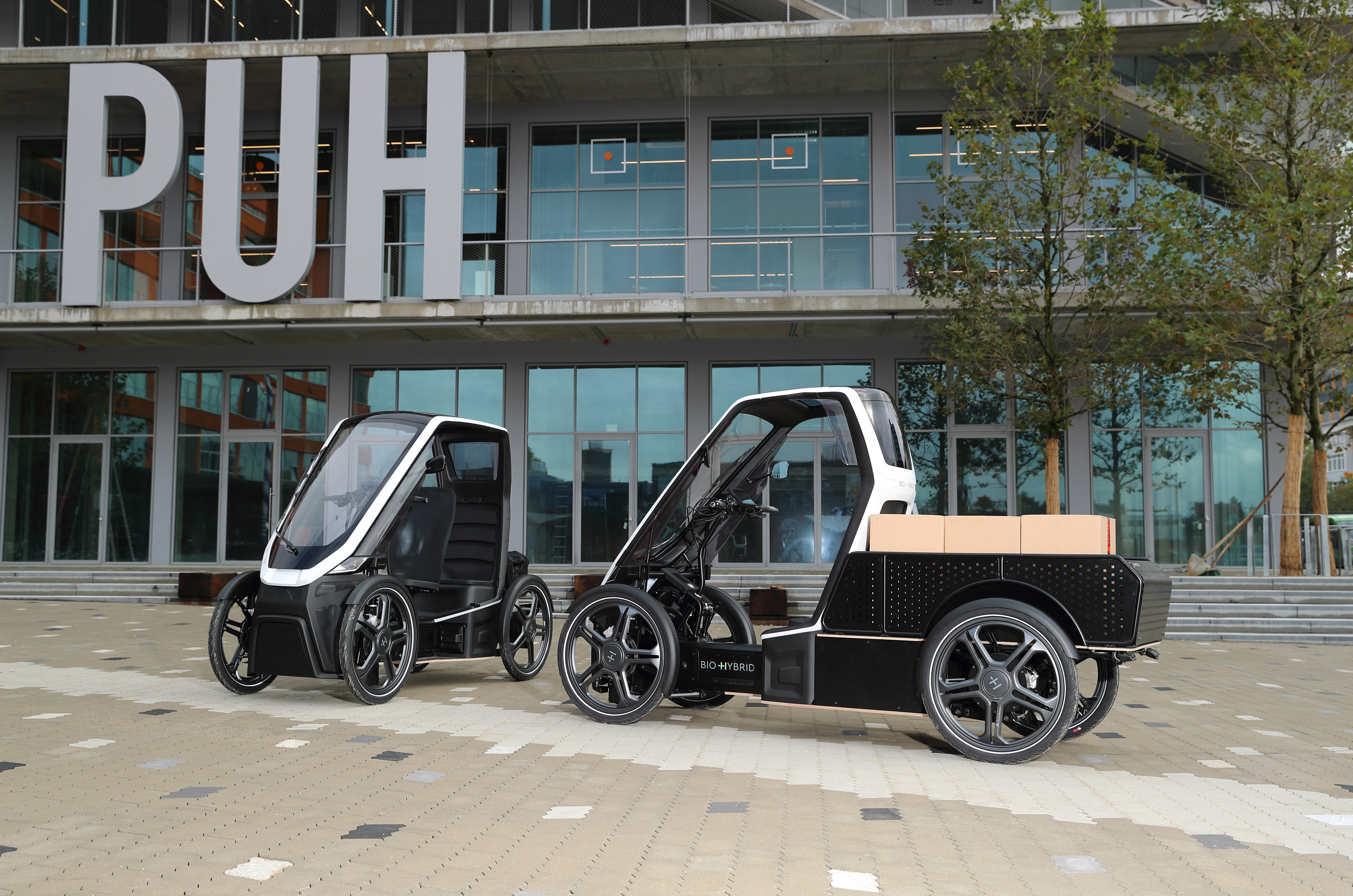
Quadricycles combining muscle power and an electric motor

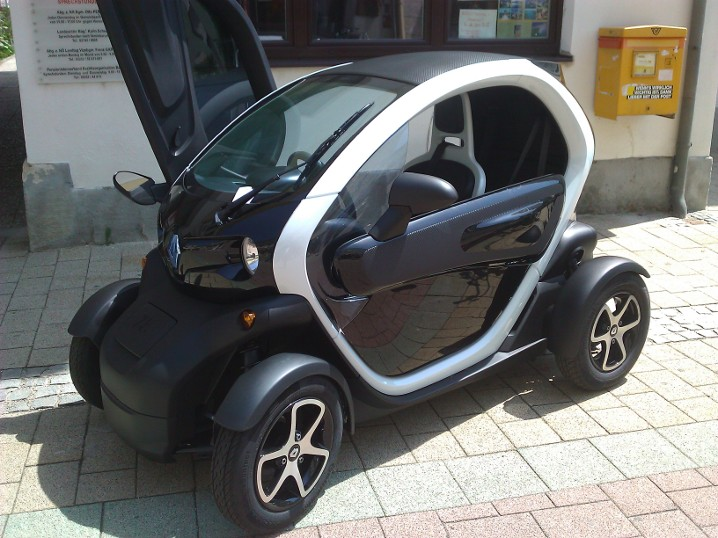
Light electric vehicles are small, light and drive electrically (Austria).

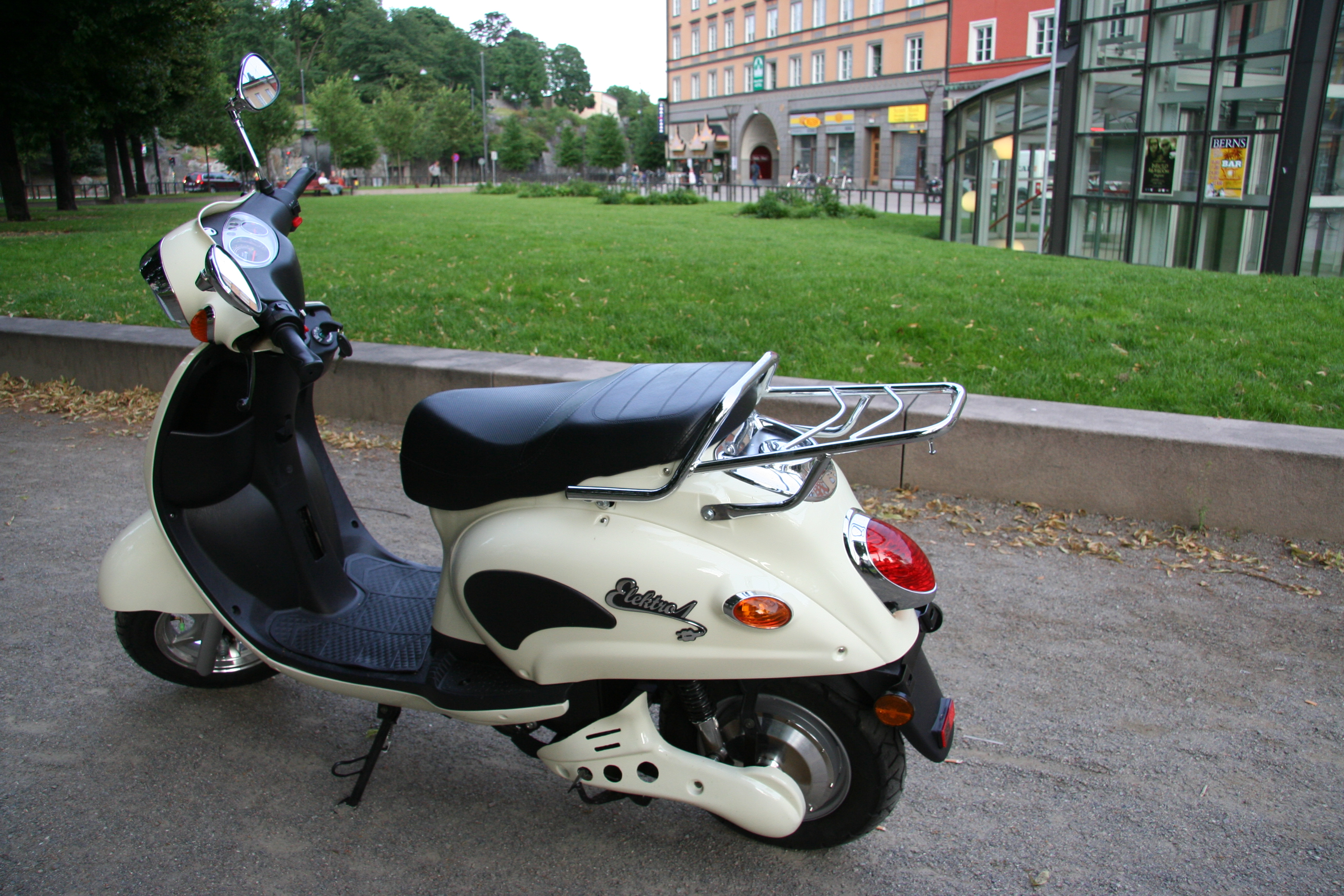
Swedish nostalgic E-roller with a modern Japanese engine

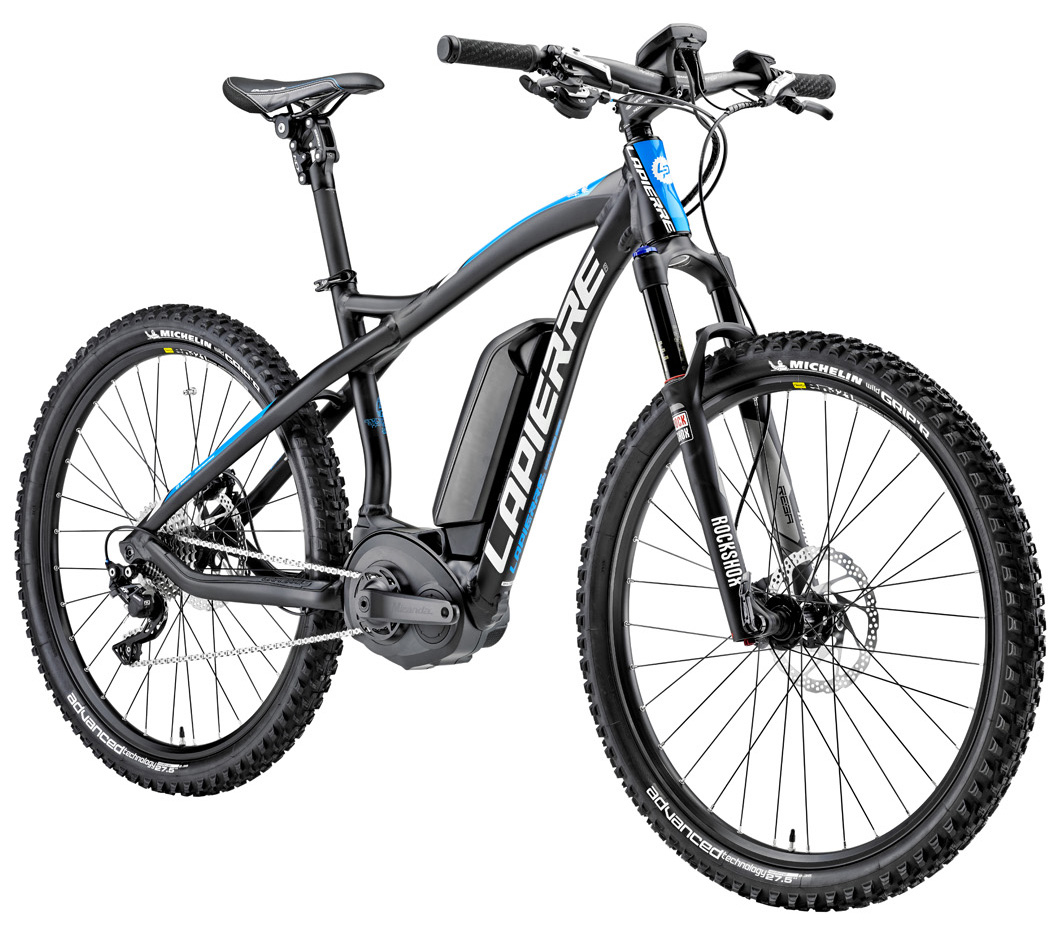
A pedelec with mid-engine from French company Lapierre Bikes

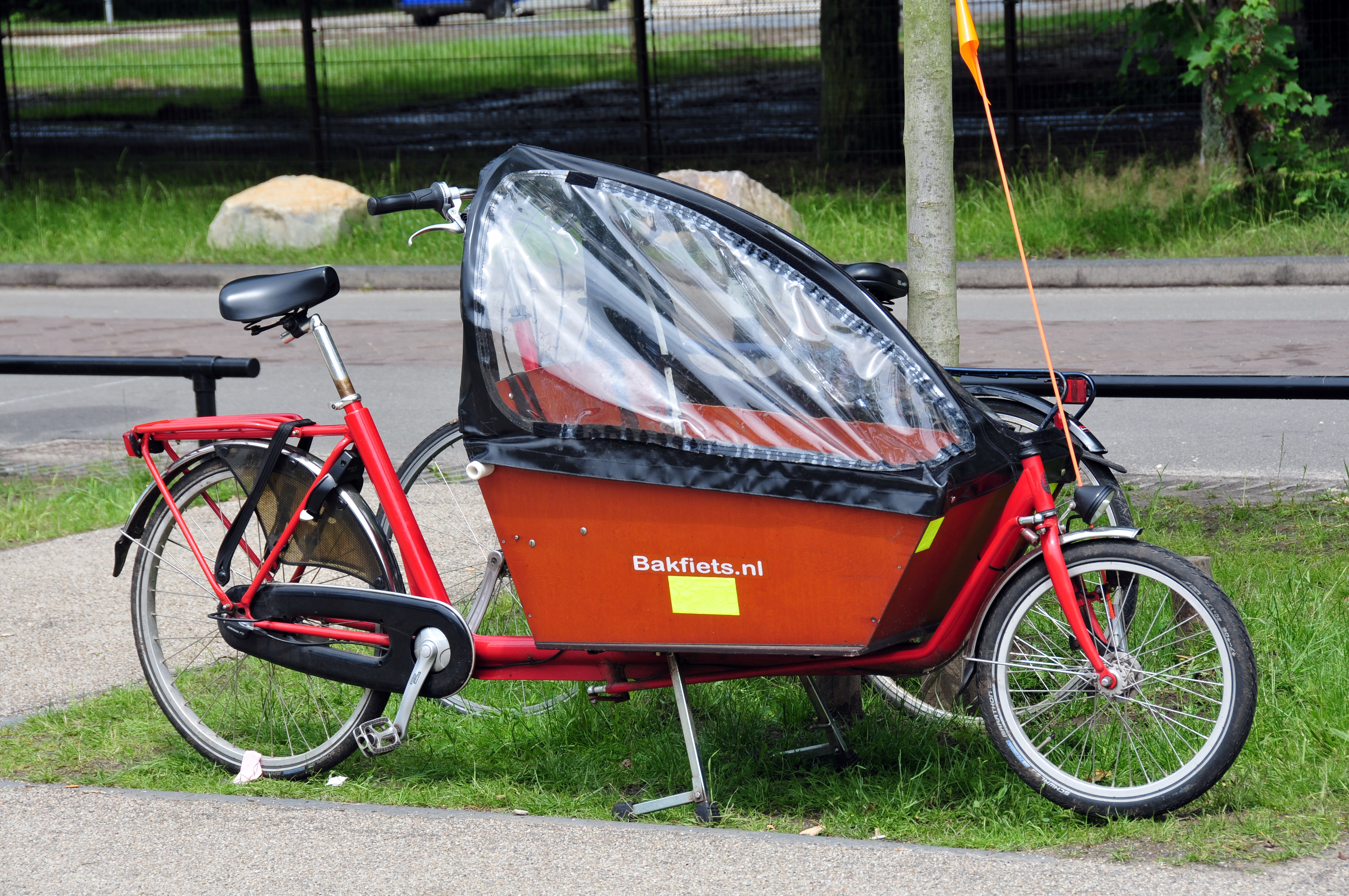
Cargo bike for transporting children in Eindhoven, Netherlands

=== Vienna ===
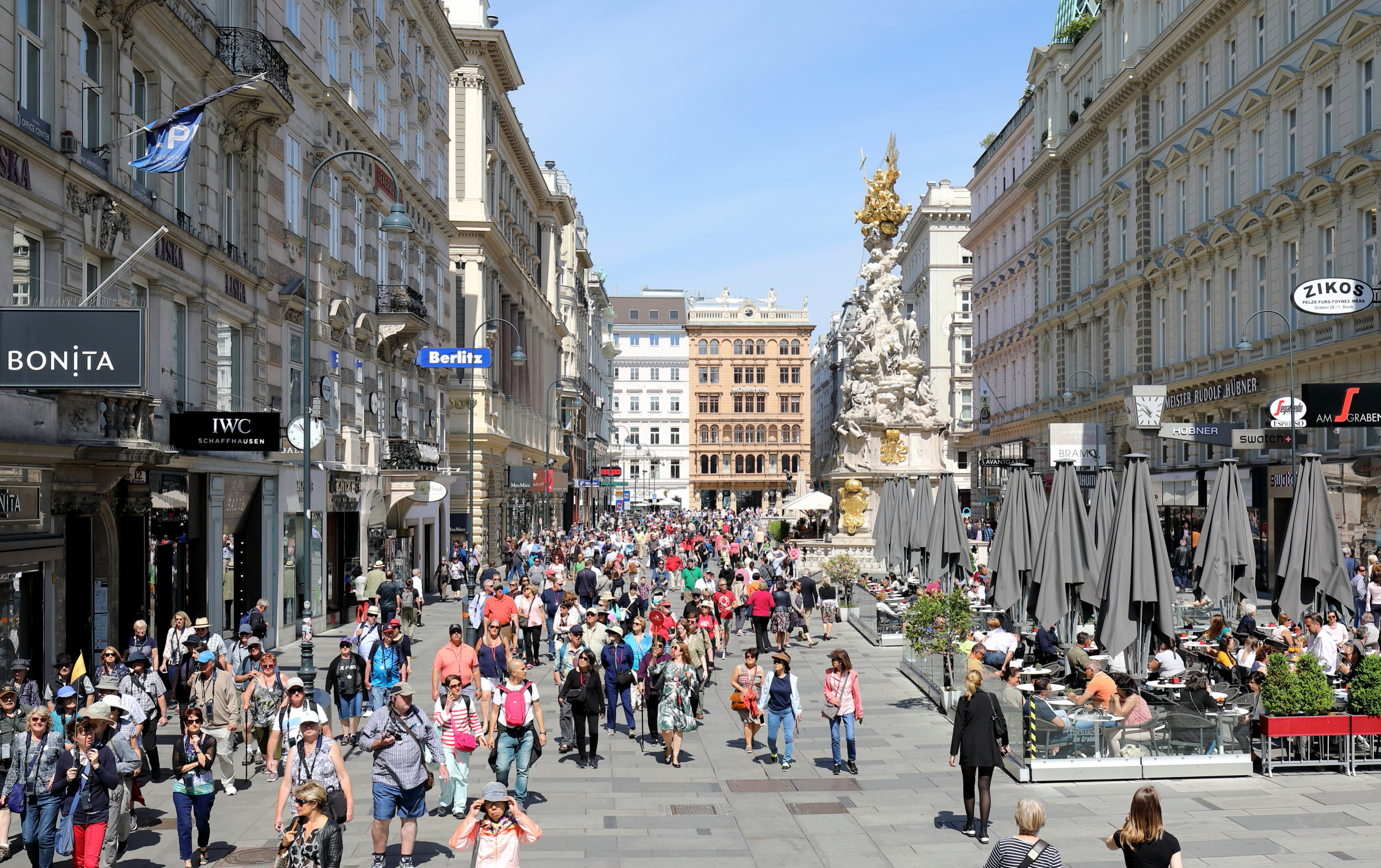
Pedestrian zones, such as the Graben in Vienna (introduced in 1971), make a city attractive.

Vienna, the capital of Austria, has been consistently developing into a city that is restructuring public space and promoting local public transport. Viennese urban planner Hermann Knoflacher has stated: 'The money comes on foot or by bike.' The economic use of space as parking spaces is inefficient. A car-free street increases the turnover of restaurants, clothing stores and retailers. This would create new jobs.

The attractiveness of public transport can be stimulated by lowering the price of an annual pass: in Vienna, from 2012 until 2025, one could use public transport with a subscription fee of 1 euro a day. Between 2012 and 2018 the number of annual ticket holders increased from 373,000 to 780,000. At the same time as the changeover, the city began to invest more heavily in local transport. In July 2018, some German cities announced that they would follow the Viennese model and lower the prices for annual tickets.

However, in January 2026, the price of an annual ticket was increased to €467. Renewed assurances that the price would not increase had been given less than a year earlier.

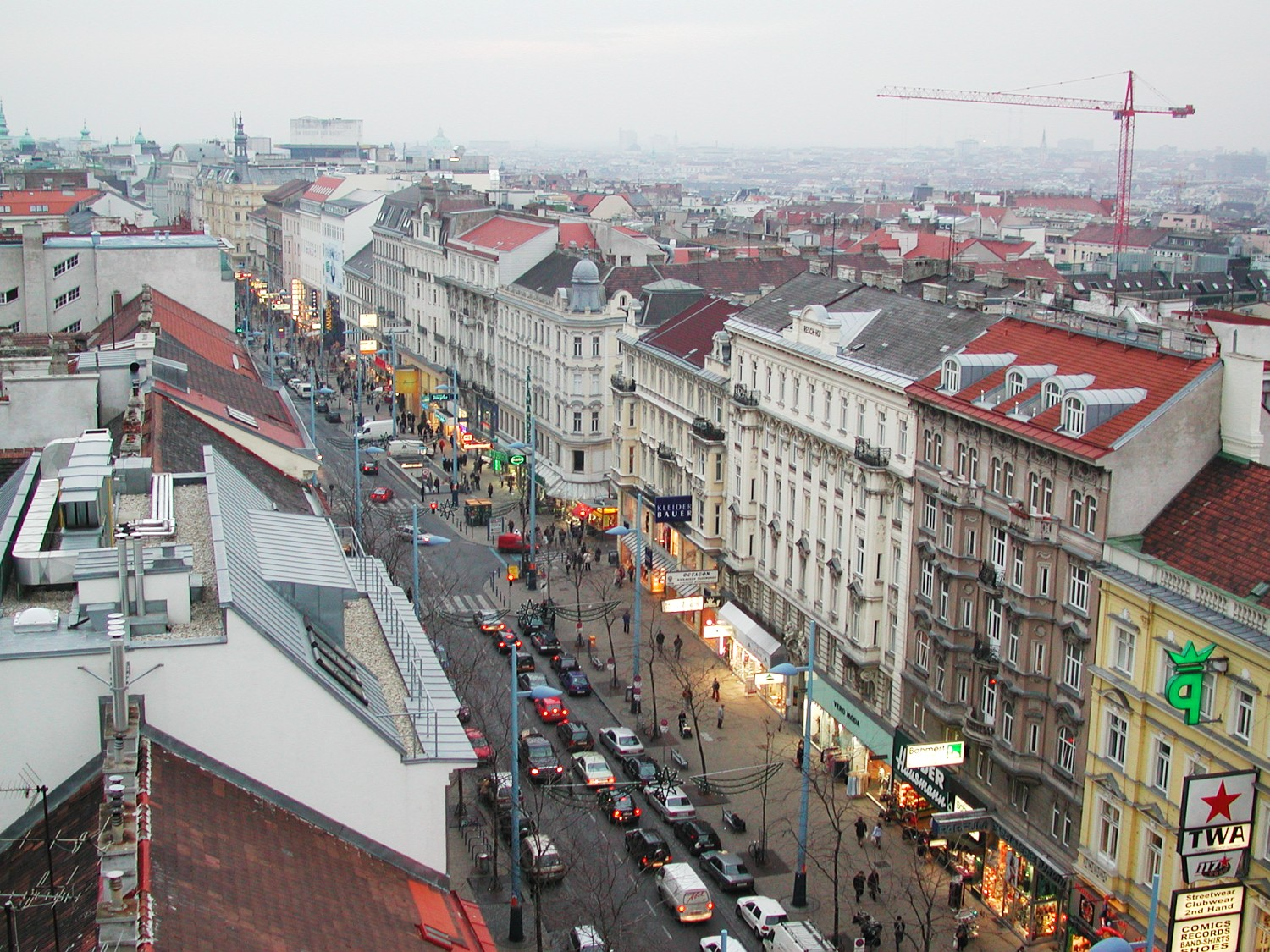
The Mariahilfer Straße in Vienna in 2006, with frequent car congestion

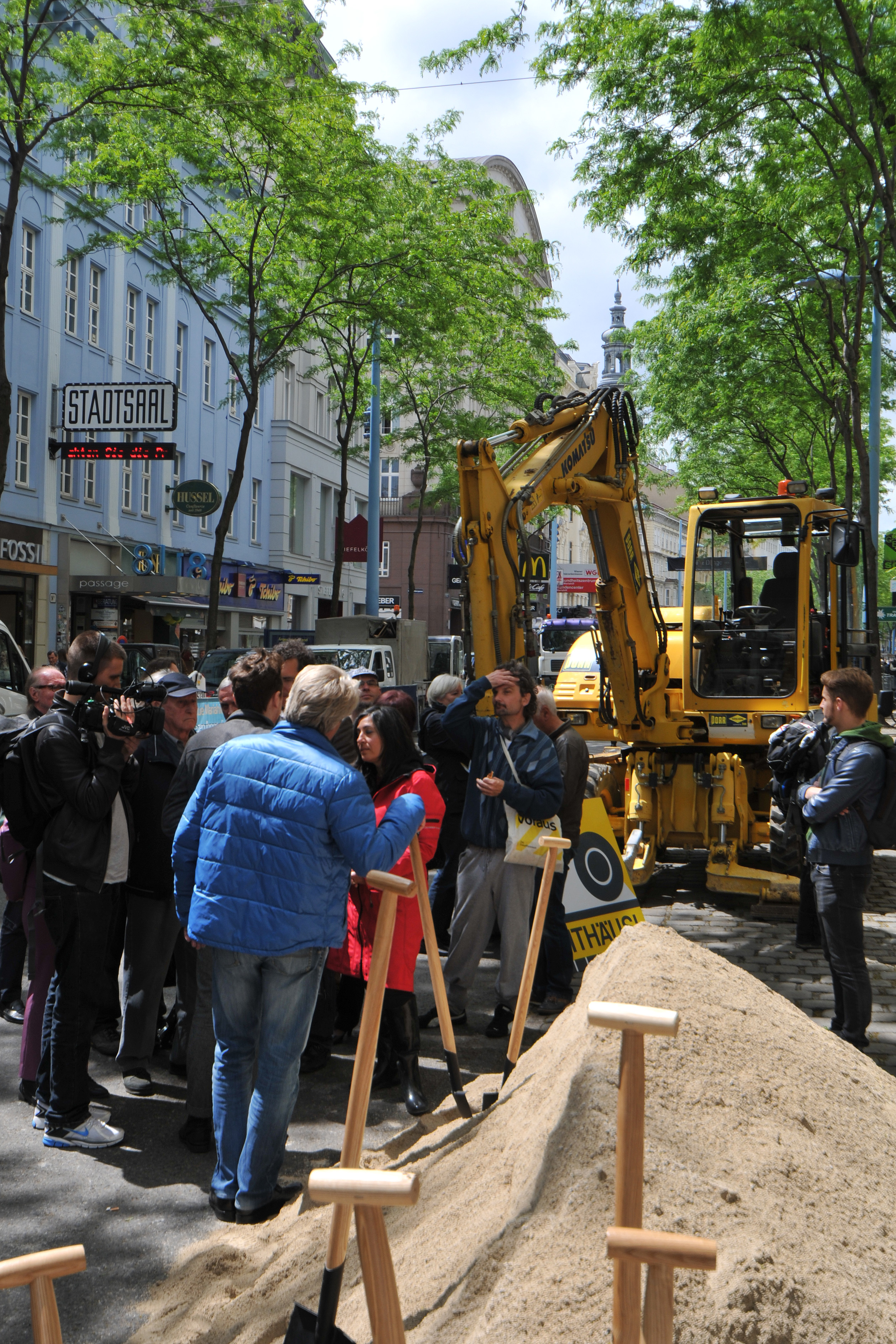
During 2010–2015, the road was restructured and pedestrianised.

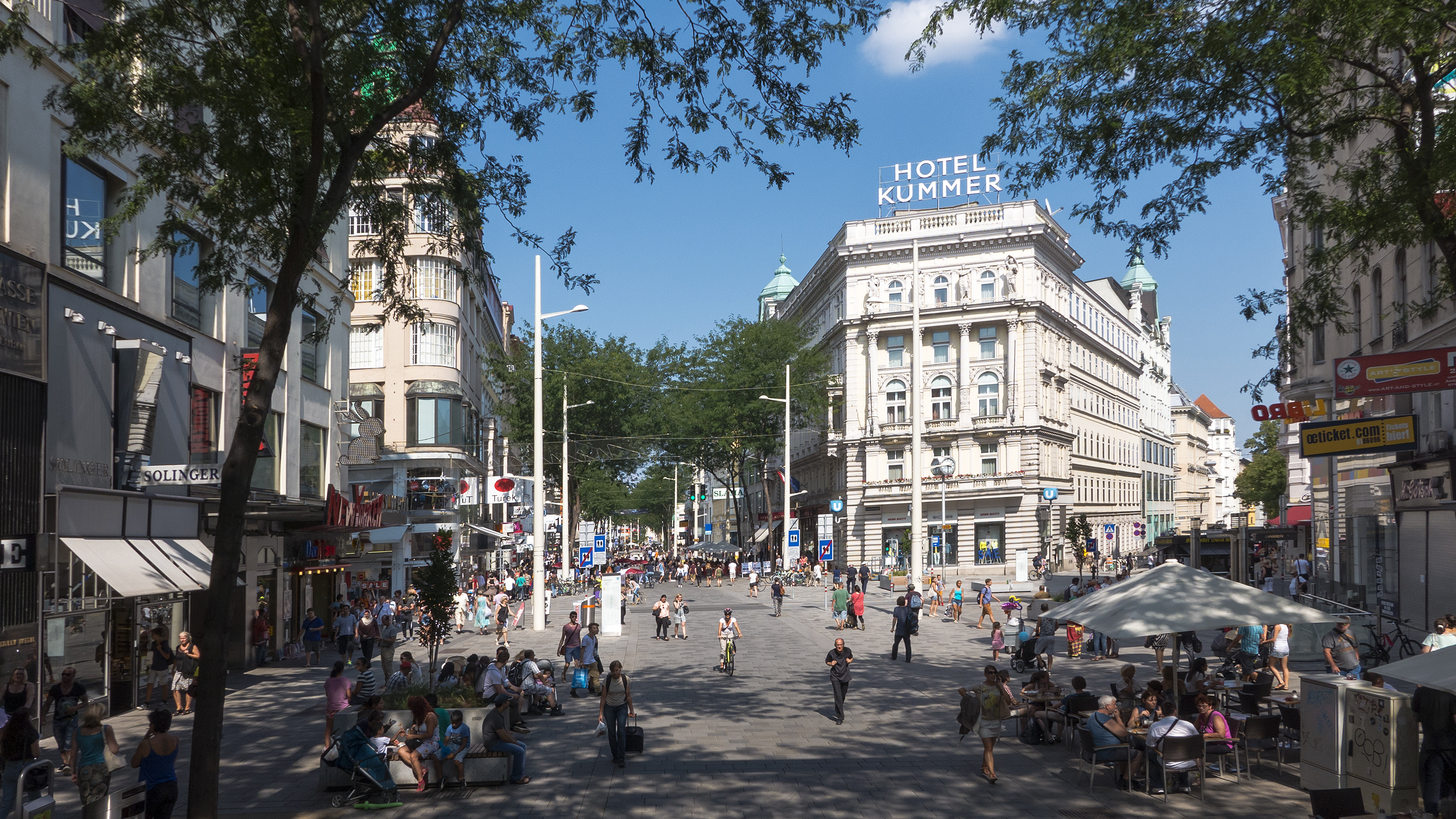
2015: redesigned street with spacious pedestrian and meeting zones

=== Luxembourg ===
Since 1 March 2020, local public transport across Luxembourg has been free of charge for everyone. The Grand Duchy thus became the first country in the world to introduce free local public transit. An exception to this is first class travel on the railways. A major reason for the overhaul was the increasingly problematic traffic jams on Luxembourg's roads.

=== Further examples ===
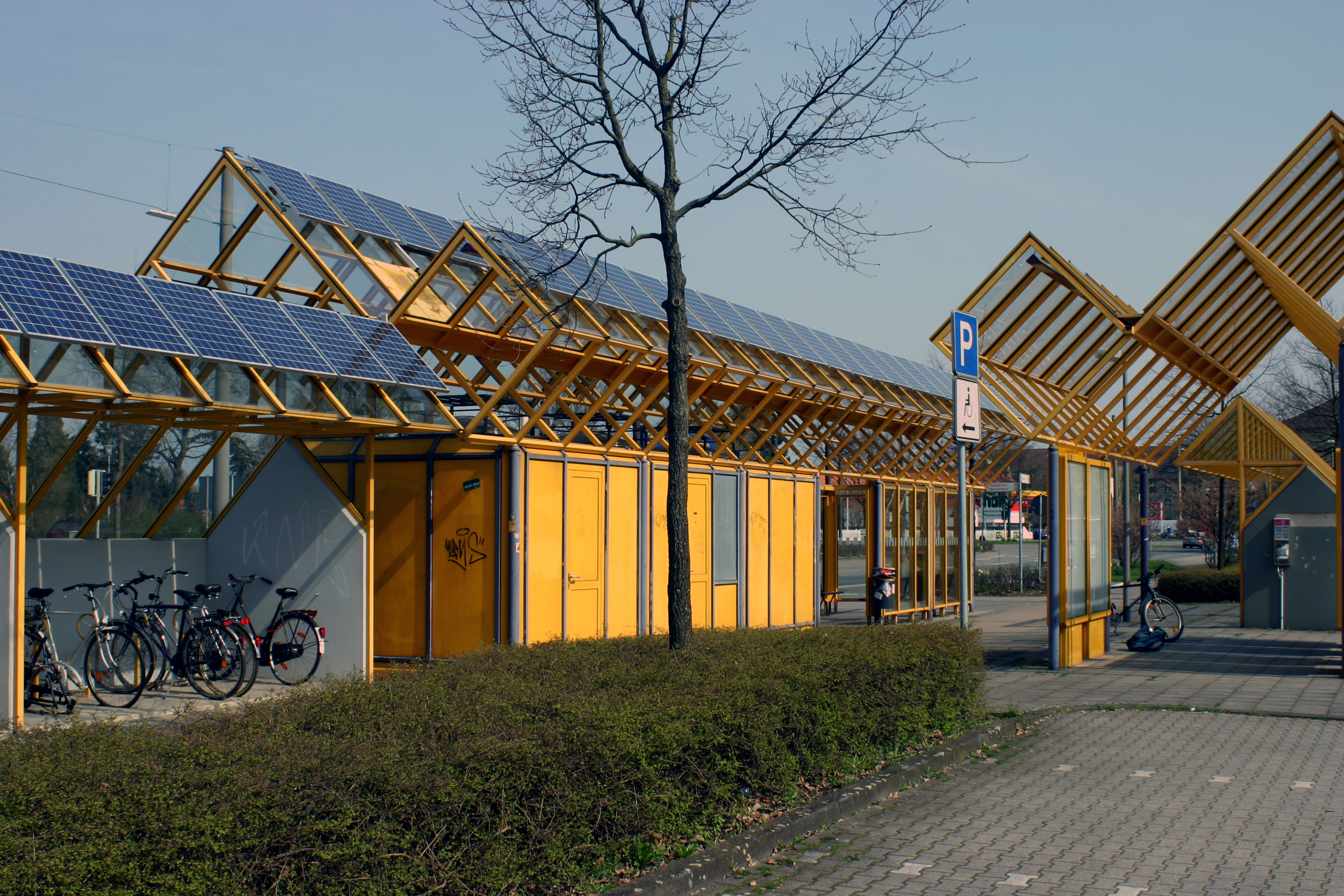
Cycling in Münster: a mobility station connects buses and bikes.

Several more significant examples of (potential) components and initiatives for mobility transition that have been proposed, studied, or put into practice include:

- As an alternative to the Viennese model of the annual ticket, a citizen ticket is being discussed in some German municipalities as a new way of financing and using local public transport. It is to be financed by a levy for all citizens of a municipality and function as a kind of flat rate for buses and trains.
- Phase-out of fossil fuel vehicles: In Germany, a ban on the sale of combustion engines from 2030 has been adopted by the Bundesrat in October 2016. Norway, on the other hand, already wants no cars with petrol or diesel engines to be registered from 2025 and ships and ferries only to be registered without fossil fuels from 2030, and is therefore considered a leading nation in electromobility. The Netherlands are also planning a ban on the registration of conventional drives in cars from 2025. In China, all automotive groups are obliged to meet a quota for the production and sale of purely electric or plug-in hybrid drives.
- There are numerous electromobility projects in Germany, such as the Modellregionen Elektromobilität and BeMobility. The German Association of Towns and Municipalities (DStGB) sees towns and municipalities as drivers and designers of the mobility transition and also supports a number of projects.

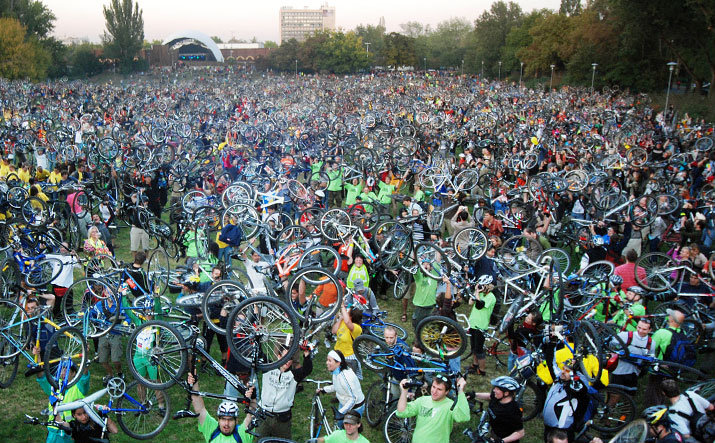
Critical Mass in Budapest (2007)

- Critical Mass is a form of direct action for promoting more and safer cycling in cities around the world. When riding together through inner cities, cyclists draw attention to cycling as a form of individual transport, advocate for mobility transition and, in particular, more rights for cyclists, better cycling traffic networks and infrastructure, and more room for non-motorised traffic. The first Critical Mass action took place in September 1992 in San Francisco.
- To improve air quality, efforts across Europe are being stepped up to introduce low-emission zones. A progressive approach is the French Crit'air, which provides for different restrictions depending on air pollution. The applicable prohibitions can be viewed on the Internet or via phone app. Electric vehicles or hydrogen-powered vehicles receive category 0 (green vignette) and can always drive anywhere. Diesel driving bans were also issued in Germany.
- Instead of a company car, individual companies offer their employees a mobility budget that can be used to pay for different means of transport for business purposes.
- The island city-state of Singapore has not allowed additional private cars since 1 February 2018 under its Vehicular Quota System. This is intended to promote the switch to public transport and active mobility. It is also the only country in the world which requires all prospective vehicle owners to bid for a Certificate of Entitlement before they are allowed to own a vehicle for up to 10 years. The state only gives permission for a new car if another has been de-registered. Singapore was also the first country in the world to implement congestion pricing in 1975.
- Since 2003, there has been a London congestion charge which drivers have to pay in Central London. From October 2017 on, an additional, new fee for older and more polluting cars and vans is due with a toxicity charge.
- In many cities in Germany there are citizens' initiatives which, following the example of the Initiative Volksentscheid Fahrrad ("Cycling Referendum Initiative") in Berlin, advocate for mobility transition and "bicycle laws". In June 2018, the Berlin Mobility Act to promote cycling was passed in Berlin, also due to a successful application for a referendum.
- Traffic lights are being tested in Karlsruhe as part of a pilot project which, in contrast to conventional pedestrian traffic lights, display a permanent green light for pedestrians and cyclists, not for vehicles, and only interrupt this when a vehicle approaches.
- In Japan, it is generally illegal to park a car on the street; a car buyer must provide evidence of owning private parking space or renting a public parking space for the car. As of 2019, renting fees for public parking spaces in the more central districts of Tokyo cost about €300−500 a month, while in residential areas on the outskirts of Tokyo they cost around €100 a month. Only after the police have verified that the parking lot exists and is large enough for the car the owner wants to buy, the car dealer approves the purchase, and gives the owner a parking sticker to put on the new car's front or rear window. The Japanese state has been using regulations to discourage the sale of luxury cars and to stimulate consumers to buy small light-weight cars with small engines (see also: kei car) or to motivate them to switch to local public transport. Singapore has a similar policy where (prospective) owners of large goods vehicles in Singapore must first provide proof of a space to park the vehicle in question under the Vehicle Parking Certificate Scheme.
- In Spain, a general speed limit of 30 km/h (19 mph) in built-up areas was introduced in 2021. On narrow streets with only one lane (often found in historic city centres), the permitted speed was limited to a maximum of 20 km/h (12 mph); for streets with more than one lane in both directions, the previously set speed limit was maintained at 50 km/h. A total of 509 people died in urban traffic accidents in Spain in 2019. The 2021 reduction of urban speed limits was intended to reduce the risk of pedestrians dying after being hit by a car by 80%.
- With the educational motto Weniger Wagen wagen ("risk fewer cars"), the Roman Catholic Archdiocese of Cologne has sought to raise awareness, and has calculated: 'Due to mobility (journeys to work, committees, church services, etc.), around 16,370 tons of CO_{2} (as of 2012) are emitted annually in the Archdiocese of Cologne. This corresponds to a share of approx. 13 per cent of the archdiocese's total emissions.' In response, the Archdiocese stated it sought 'strategic and practical reorientation of mobility', including stimulating cycling through the Pharr-Rad initiative (a pun on Pfarrer "priest" and Fahrrad "bycicle") and the BistumsTicket ("diocesan ticket") which offers reduced fees for public transport travels by groups of 50 people or more to Catholic events organised within the archdiocese.

=== Short-haul flight ban ===
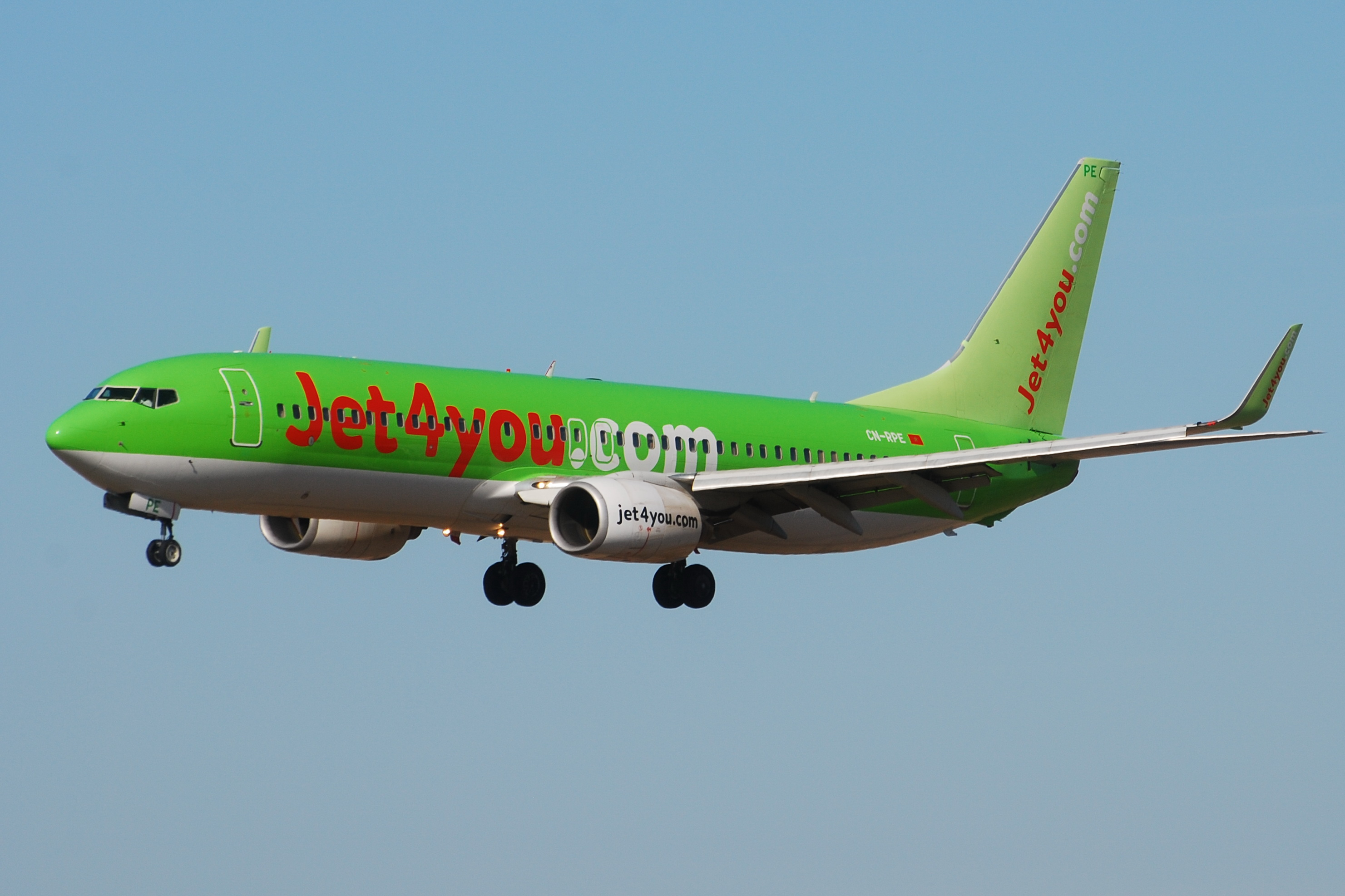
The Belgian region of Wallonia banned Jet4you from flying between Charleroi and Liège in 2006 for environmental reasons.

A short-haul flight ban is a prohibition imposed by governments on airlines to establish and maintain a flight connection over a certain distance, or by organisations or companies on their employees for business travel using existing flight connections over a certain distance, in order to mitigate the environmental impact of aviation (most notably to reduce anthropogenic greenhouse gas emissions which is the leading cause of climate change). In the 21st century, several governments, organisations and companies have imposed restrictions and even prohibitions on short-haul flights, stimulating or pressuring travellers to opt for more environmentally friendly means of transportation, especially trains.

A portion of air travelers in short-haul routes connect to other flights at their destination. A blanket ban would have a significant impact on these travelers, as inadequate rail connectivity between airports and main railway hubs of cities generally result in longer overall travel times and disruption to travellers overall.

By July 2019, most political parties in Germany, including the Left Party, the Social Democrats, the Green Party and the Christian Democrats, started to agree to move all governmental institutions remaining in Bonn (the former capital of West Germany) to Berlin (the official capital since German Reunification in 1990), because ministers and civil servants were flying between the two cities about 230,000 times a year, which was considered too impractical, expensive and environmentally damaging. The distance of 500 kilometres between Bonn and Berlin could only be travelled by train in 5.5 hours, so either the train connections required upgrading, or Bonn had to be abolished as the secondary capital.

== Measures in freight transport ==
=== Sea freight ===
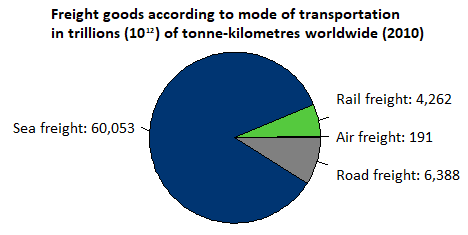
Global freight volumes according to mode of transport in trillions of tonne-kilometres in 2010

By far the largest part of the world's freight traffic is sea freight. In 2010, about 60,000 trillion kilometre-tonnes were transported by sea, which was 85% of the world's total freight traffic. According to a 2015 forecast by Statista, by 2050 the volume of freight will have increased to four times the levels of 2010, while the share of sea freight will remain about the same.

Transporting goods by container ship is very efficient. Relatively few carbon dioxide (CO_{2}) emissions are caused per transported tonne and kilometre compared to transport by truck (lorry). According to the Naturschutzbund Deutschland (NABU), the latter emit 50 grams of carbon dioxide per tonne and kilometre, while container ships only emit 15 grams. However, the mineral oil-based ship fuel used by container ships is particularly polluting; 90 per cent of all large ships run on heavy fuel oil (bunker fuel). Among other things, this means that emissions of toxic sulfur oxide are many times higher. To counteract this problem, the International Maritime Organization (IMO) lowered the limit value for sulfur in fuel from 3.5% to 0.5% in 2020.

Efficiency can be further increased and fuel consumption reduced by building the ships even larger.

There are innovations to harness wind power for sea transportation. These include cylindrical sails that can be retrofitted to cargo ships (making them "rotor ships" or "Flettner ships") and can reduce fuel consumption. Another option is a towing kite construction, which was originally developed in 2001 by the Hamburg-based company SkySails and is now being sold by AirSeas. The sail has an area of 1,000 square metres and was developed to reduce fuel consumption on cargo ships by up to 20%. As of 2019, the aviation group Airbus was testing this idea on four of its own freighters with the aim of saving up to 8,000 tonnes of carbon dioxide emissions.

=== Inland navigation ===
Timelapse of ships on the Rhine at Cologne (2015)

As inland navigation (also known as 'inland waterway transport' (IWT) or 'inland shipping') is a relatively environmentally friendly option for freight transport (similar to rail freight transport), researchers and policy makers have been aiming to shift the volume of cargo transported by more pollutive means towards inland navigation (for example, as part of the 2019 European Green Deal). According to the Research Information System for Mobility and Traffic (FIS; an agency of the German Transport Ministry), deficits in the competitiveness of German inland navigation, especially in an international comparison, are responsible for the stagnating transport volume of German inland navigation. A water infrastructure that is not optimally developed with insufficient water channel depths and bridge clearance heights lead to low loading capacities and thus to high costs. A certain exception are the waterways of the Rhine area, which also have by far the highest transport volume. Furthermore, the German inland waterway fleet is quite old by international comparison (45 years in 2013).

Inland navigation is closely related to seaport hinterland traffic. For example, in the modal split in hinterland traffic at the Dutch and Belgian seaports (Rotterdam, Amsterdam, Antwerp and Zeebrugge), inland shipping has a share of around 55%, while in Germany it usually remains below 10% of hinterland traffic. The reason for this is the better expansion of the Rhine waterways. Furthermore, the majority of the 250 important inland ports in Germany are owned by large companies that only handle transport goods from third-party companies to a small extent. Against this background, the FIS has called for the expansion and maintenance of German waterways. The number and carrying capacity of the German inland waterway vessels has remained constant in the early 21st century and was around 2.61 million tonnes in 2015.

Various approaches to energy efficiency and air pollution reduction are being tested and researched in inland shipping. This includes propulsion configurations such as the father–son concept, diesel-electric hybrid drives, hydrodynamic optimisations, fuel water emulsion injection, SCR-catalysts, diesel particulate filters, gas-to-liquid fuels (GTL) or Liquified Natural Gas (LNG), some of which can also be used in combination and are suitable for retrofitting existing systems. With an engine funding program, the German Transport Ministry supports inland navigation companies in the installation and retrofitting of low-emission engines or other emission-reducing technologies. The funding rate is up to 70%.

=== Road freight and modal share ===
Freight in the United States by per cent ton-miles (2010 FRA report)

Freight in Germany (2019) (total: 700 tonne-kilometres)
1. Truck (71.2%)
2. Rail (19.0%)
3. Inland ship (7.30%)
4. Oil pipeline (2.50%)

In road freight transport, some transport companies are proposing partly new technologies such as trolleytrucks, electric trucks or electric cargo bikes. Package delivery services are experimenting with new concepts of smart logistics. Trolleytrucks with an auxiliary battery offer the possibility of lower-emission long-distance truck transport that is also more energy-efficient than battery-powered trucks. Equipping motorways with overhead lines for heavy goods vehicles (HGVs) has the advantage that HGVs would only have to carry small batteries, as only comparatively short distances would be covered in battery-only mode. At the same time, trolleytrucks would be a cost-effective way to make freight transport climate-friendly, as the electrification of motorways, at a cost of 3 million euros/km, does not represent too much of a financial outlay.

Another option to reduce CO_{2} emissions and environmental problems is to shift truck traffic to freight rail and inland waterway transport. This process is also known as modal shift. The German Environment Agency gives the climate impact of transport by truck in the reference year 2020 as 126 grams of CO_{2} equivalents per tonne-kilometre on average (g/tkm). According to the Environment Agency, transport by freight train has a climate impact of 33 g/tkm and transport by inland waterway vessel has a climate impact of 43 g/tkm, making rail and ship significantly more climate-friendly.

Although the European Union and its member states strongly promote the use of inland waterways and rail in combination with truck transport, in some cases financially, only HGVs have been developing positively in the 2010s, while shipping and rail have been stagnating or recording declines. For 2016, the Federal Statistical Office of Germany reported a decline in transport performance of 3.7% for inland waterways, a decline of 0.5% for rail and growth of 2.8% for trucks. In 2015, with a growing transport volume of 1.1%, there was a plus of 1.9% for road, a minus of 1% for rail and a minus of 3.2% for inland waterways. Overall, 71% of the transport performance is accounted for by the truck.

With growing containerization however, a combination of different modes of transport (intermodal freight transport) becomes more efficient. In so-called multimodal transport or combined transport, the truck only has to cover the last mile between the port or rail terminal and the customer. Measures to promote combined transport are, for example:

- The Port of Rotterdam has set a quota for the modal share of hinterland transport modes: the truck share is to drop from 47% to 35%, while rail is to provide 20% instead of 13% in the future, and the transport performance of inland waterways is to increase from 40% to 45%.
- Instead of burdening trunk roads with the transport of heavy goods such as industrial plants or components for wind turbines, German transport companies have been required since 2010 to use the electronic portal Procedural Management of Large and Heavy Goods Transport (VEMAGS) to check whether alternative transport routes such as ship and rail are available, and if not, to explain that in their application for a permit to transport goods via road trucks.
- With the promotion of handling facilities for combined transport, the German federal government supports the shift in traffic to inland waterways and freight trains.
- The Lower-Rhine Chamber of Commerce and Industry, the Schifferbörse and the Development Centre for Naval Technology and Transport Systems (DST) in Duisburg jointly offer an additional course. Apprentice forwarding and logistics clerks should thus learn about the advantages of alternative modes of transport, rail and inland waterway, and thus integrate them more easily into their everyday work. Frequently, the curriculum only includes road freight transport and additional sea freight or air transport.

== See also ==
- Energy transition
- Jet fuel tax
- Phase-out of fossil fuel vehicles
- Right to mobility
- Urban sprawl

== Literature ==
- Adey, Peter; Cresswell, Tim; Lee, Jane Yeonjae; Nikolaeva, Anna; Nóvoa, André; Temenos, Cristina (2021). Moving Towards Transition: Commoning Mobility for a Low-Carbon Future. London: Bloomsbury Publishing. p. 4. ISBN 9781786998989.
- Claudia Hornberg et al. (2017), Sachverständigenrat für Umweltfragen [SRU] (ed.), Umsteuern erforderlich: Klimaschutz im Verkehrssektor: Sondergutachten November 2017 (PDF) (in German), Berlin, ISBN 978-3-947370-11-5, Format: PDF, KBytes: 2326
- Udo Becker: Grundwissen Verkehrsökologie: Grundlagen, Handlungsfelder und Maßnahmen für die Verkehrswende. München 2016, ISBN 978-3-86581-993-2.
- Andrej Cacilo: Wege zu einer nachhaltigen Mobilität: Im Spannungsfeld kultureller Werte, ökonomischer Funktionslogik und diskursrationaler Wirtschafts- und Umweltethik. 2., durchges. Aufl., Metropolis, Marburg 2021, ISBN 978-3-7316-1473-9.
- Weert Canzler, Andreas Knie: Schlaue Netze – Wie die Energie- und Verkehrswende gelingt. München 2013, ISBN 978-3-86581-440-1.
- Weert Canzler, Andreas Knie, Lisa Ruhrort, Christian Scherf: Erloschene Liebe? Das Auto in der Verkehrswende. Soziologische Deutungen. transcript, Bielefeld 2018, ISBN 978-3-8376-4568-2.
- Hermann Knoflacher: Zurück zur Mobilität! Anstöße zum Umdenken. Ueberreuter, Wien 2013, ISBN 978-3-8000-7557-7.
- Katharina Manderscheid (2020), "Antriebs-, Verkehrs- oder Mobilitätswende? Zur Elektrifizierung des Automobilitätsdispositivs" (PDF), in Achim Brunnengräber, Tobias Haas (ed.), Baustelle Elektromobilität – Sozialwissenschaftliche Perspektiven auf die Transformation der (Auto-)Mobilität (in German), Bielefeld: transcript, pp. 37-67, ISBN 978-3-8376-5165-2, Format: PDF, KBytes: 2940
- Markus Hesse: Verkehrswende. ökologisch-ökonomische Perspektiven für Stadt und Region. Marburg 1993, ISBN 978-3-926570-62-8.
