= Zelinsky Model =

Migration model

The Zelinsky Model of Migration Transition, also known as the Migration Transition Model or Zelinsky's Migration Transition Model, claims that the type of migration that occurs within a country depends on its development level and its society type. It connects migration to the stages within the Demographic Transition Model (DTM). It was developed by Wilbur Zelinsky, professor of geography at Pennsylvania State University.

== Stages ==
=== One ===
Stage one ("Premodern traditional society"): This is before the onset of urbanization, and involves little to no migration, while natural increase rates are about zero. Mobility (nomadism) is high, but migration is low. The high mortality of pre-modern societies compensates for higher fertility and slow population growth.

=== Two ===
Stage two ("Early transitional society"): During stage two a "massive movement from the countryside to cities" occurs. Industrialization improves public health and reduces mortality. The "rate of natural increase" is rapid. Internationally migration rates are high, although the total population number is still rising.

=== Three ===
Stage three ("Late transitional society") corresponds to the "critical rung...of the mobility transition" where urban-to-urban migration surpasses the rural-to-urban migration, where rural-to-urban migration "continues but at waning absolute or relative rates", and "a complex migrational and circular movements within the urban network, from city to city or within a single metropolitan region" increased, circulation and non-economic migration start to emerge. The net-out migration trend shifts to net-in migration. Mortality falls while population growth slows due to eroding social norms.

=== Four ===
Stage four ("Advanced society"): During stage four the "movements from the countryside to the city continues, but is reduced in absolute and relative terms. Vigorous movement of migrants from city to city and within individual urban agglomerations...especially within a highly elaborated lattice of major and minor metropolises" is observed. A large increase in urban to suburban migration can also occur. The rate of natural increase is "slight to none".

=== Five ===
Stage five ("Future super-advanced society"): During stage five "Nearly all residential migration may be of the interurban and intraurban variety.... No plausible predictions of fertility behavior because of a declining population,...a stable mortality pattern slightly below present levels".

== See also ==
- Human migration
- Gravity model of migration
- Mobility transition
- Demographic gravitation
- Demographic transition model
