= Wilbur Zelinsky =

American geographer

- Born: December 21, 1921; Chicago, Illinois, U.S.
- Died: May 4, 2013 (aged 91); State College, Pennsylvania, U.S.
- Occupation: Geographer

Academic background
- Education: University of California, Berkeley (BA, PhD); University of Wisconsin, Madison (MA)

Academic work
- Discipline: Cultural geography
- Institutions: Pennsylvania State University

Wilbur Zelinsky (December 21, 1921 – May 4, 2013) was an American cultural geographer. He was most recently a professor emeritus at Pennsylvania State University. He also created the Zelinsky Model of Demographic Transition.

== Background and education ==
Zelinsky was born in Chicago to Russian immigrants Louis Zelinsky and Esther Mastoon Zelinsky. Zelinsky attended and graduated from Edwin G. Foreman High School. Zelinsky received his Bachelor's Degree from the University of California, Berkeley (UC Berkeley) in 1944 and his Master's degree from the University of Madison, Wisconsin. He and returned to UC Berkeley for his PhD in 1953 where he was a student of Carl Sauer.

== Scholarship ==
Zelinsky made numerous geographical studies of American popular culture, ranging from the diffusion of classical place-names to spatial patterns of personal given names and the spatial patterning of religious denominations. One of his most ambitious and imaginative projects was a provocative assessment of the impact of increasingly powerful personal preference on the spatial character of American society.

During the 1960s, along with Gordon DeJong, Warren Robinson, and Paul Baker, Zelinsky helped launch a population research center and coordinate an interdisciplinary graduate instructional program in population studies at Penn State and thus helped lay the foundation for what would become the dual-title Graduate Program in Demography. During 1972–1973 he served as the first Director of the Population Issues Research Center (what would become the Population Research Institute at Penn State).

In 1973, Zelinsky published The Cultural Geography of the United States. In addition to his research in popular culture, he made substantial contributions in the fields of "population" and "folk geography".

=== Theory of First Effective Settlement ===
Zelinsky's Theory of First Effective Settlement was that the dominant culture of a nation is defined by the first settlers who came to an area who are able to effect a self-perpetuating society. The theory states that these first settlers have significant impact on the social and cultural geography of the area, however few these first settlers may have been. They lay the groundwork for the following generations and are perhaps more important than the contributions of thousands of new immigrants generations later. Colin Woodard further expands upon this theory in his book, American Nations.

== Recognition ==
- Award for Meritorious Contributions to the Field of Geography, presented by the Association of American Geographers (1996).
- The Cullum Geographical Medal by the American Geographical Society in 2001.
- President of the AAG from 1972 to 1973.

== Books and Literature ==
- Zelensky, Wilbur (2011). Not Yet a Placeless Land: Tracking an Evolving American Geography. University of Massachusetts Press. ISBN 978-1-55849-871-6. JSTOR 10.2307/j.ctt5vk9fg. Wikidata Q136269718.
- A Prologue to Population Geography (1966)
- Nation into State: The Shifting Symbolic Foundations of American Nationalism (1988)
- The Cultural Geography of the United States (1973,1992)
- Exploring the Beloved Country: Geographic Forays into American Society and Culture (1994)
- The Atlas of Pennsylvania (1989, co-author)

== Family and Death ==
Zelinsky eloped with Gladys Epstein on July 5, 1944; she died in 1997. Zelinsky died in his home in State College, Pennsylvania, at age 91. He was survived by two daughters, Hollis Zelinsky and Karen Zelinsky Kite.

== See also ==
- Geographers on Film
- Louis Hartz's "fragment thesis"
- Pennsylvania Town

== See also ==
- List of geographers
