= Hermann Knoflacher =

Austrian civil engineer (born 1940)

Hermann Knoflacher (born 21 September 1940 in Villach) is an Austrian civil engineer. He was the head of the Institute for Transport Planning and Technology at the Vienna University of Technology.

== Life and teachings ==
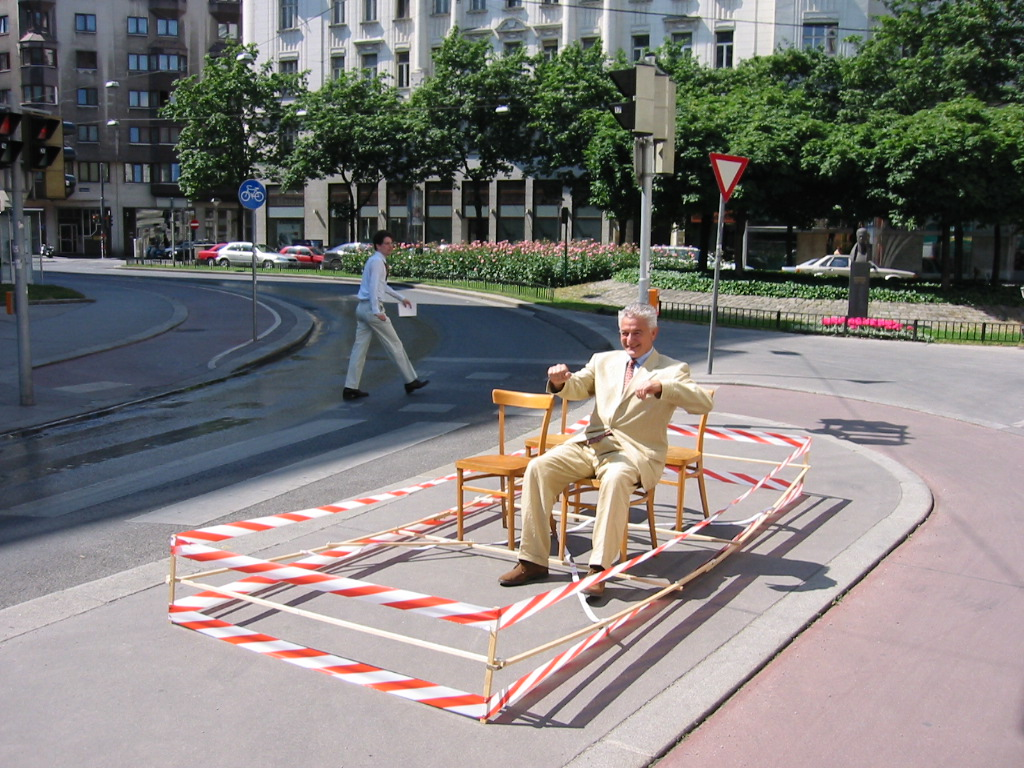
Hermann Knoflacher demonstrates his invention, the "walkmobile"

Knoflacher completed degrees in civil engineering, geodesy, and mathematics. Since 1975 he is a professor at the Vienna University of Technology. In 1985 he became head of the Institute for Transport Planning. His research focuses on spatial planning, urban planning, and transport planning. He is one of the key contributors to the sustainable transport movement (known as "Sanfte Mobilität" in German). Since 2004 he is the president of the Club of Vienna. He is also a member of the Club of Budapest and the global pedestrian representative of the United Nations.

Knoflacher is well known for his criticism of excessive automobile usage and its effects on humans and the environment. Knoflacher has compared the automobile to "a virus": "We are increasingly retreating into enclosed environments, more or less out of our own choice, while isolating ourselves from an outside world subjected to noise, pollution and dust created by cars".

Knoflacher developed the concept of the "Gehzeug" (a German neologism that can be translated as "walkmobile") to illustrate the problems he identified in urban transport policy. The "walkmobile" is essentially just a wooden frame that can be worn by a pedestrian in order to utilize the same amount of space as a motorist. The "walkmobiles" have become a popular way to draw attention at demonstrations against car dominance in cities, especially in Austria. According to Knoflacher, the walkmobile allows people to visualize the irrationality of urban motor traffic and its excessive land consumption.

== Publications ==
- Katalysatoren für Nichtmotorisierte. H. Knoflacher, Wien 1985, ISBN 3-900657-00-9.
- Fußgeher- und Fahrradverkehr. Böhlau, Wien/Köln/Weimar 1995, ISBN 3-205-98308-4.
- Zur Harmonie von Stadt und Verkehr. 2. Auflage. Böhlau, Wien/Köln/Weimar 1996 ISBN 3-205-98586-9.
- Landschaft ohne Autobahnen. Böhlau, Wien/Köln/Weimar 1996, ISBN 3-205-98436-6.
- Stehzeuge – Fahrzeuge : Der Stau ist kein Verkehrsproblem. Böhlau, Wien/Köln/Weimar 2001, ISBN 3-205-98988-0.
- Weltreligionen und Kapitalismus. Kapitalismus gezähmt? (Hrsg.). Echomedia, Wien 2006, ISBN 3-901761-54-3.
- Grundlagen der Verkehrs- und Siedlungsplanung : Verkehrsplanung. Böhlau, Wien/Köln/Weimar 2007, ISBN 978-3-205-77626-0.

His ideas on parking and transport policy are also summarized in English in Knoflacher, Hermann (2006), "A new way to organize parking: the key to a successful sustainable transport system for the future", Environment and Urbanization Vol. 18, No. 2, page 387-400.

== See also ==
- Spatial Justice
