= Motoring taxation in the United Kingdom =

Motoring taxation in the United Kingdom consists primarily of vehicle excise duty (commonly known as VED, vehicle tax, car tax, and road tax), which is levied on vehicles registered in the UK, and hydrocarbon oil duty (normally referred to as fuel tax), which is levied on the fuel used by motor vehicles.

VED and fuel tax raised approximately £32 billion in the 2023/2024 fiscal year, with some further money raised from the value added tax on fuel purchases. Fuel duties and VED representing over 3% of total UK taxation. This was 7% in the 2011/2012 fiscal year.

Road pricing, in the form of congestion charges, is in place in London and Durham. However these are generally viewed as usage charges rather than as tax for legal purposes although this interpretation is disputed by the US and some other embassies in relation to the London congestion charge.

== History ==
=== Early years ===
The history of motoring taxation was closely linked to the construction of roads until 1937, since then motoring taxation has been treated as 'general taxation' with roads competing for funds with other departments on an equal basis.

In the early years of the 20th century funding for roads and related infrastructure was drawn mainly from local ratepayers and the tram companies, who were obliged to maintain the road around their tracks under the Tramways Act 1870 (33 & 34 Vict. c. 78). The price of fuel for steam engines had been subject to local coal duties until their abolition in 1889, and centrally controlled during World War I and World War II.

The Motor Car Act 1903 introduced the £1 (£105.00 in 2025) registration fee for each motor vehicle, which were already also subject to carriage duty if they were not used solely for trade. Carriage duty was paid for a carriage licence which cost £2 2s. (£2.10) for vehicles weighing up to 1 ton, and £4 4s. (£4.20) for vehicles over 1 ton.

A new duty was introduced in 1909 on "motor spirit" (imported petrol), leaving alternative fuels duty-free. The original 1909 rate was 3d per imperial gallon (0.66 d/L). The 'Road Board' was established in 1910 which could make grants for new roads to local authorities from the Road Improvement Fund as envisage by the Development and Road Improvement Funds Act 1909.

The Roads Act 1920 required councils to register all new vehicles and to allocate a separate number to each vehicle and to Provision for the collection and application of the excise duties. The act also established the Road Fund. The Road Fund Licence (later renamed as Vehicle Excise Duty) was introduced in 1921 to improve roads which had suffered as a consequence of the Great War. It was intended as a charge that could be levied regardless of the fuel used to power a vehicle. The Minister of Transport was responsible for collecting and spending the money collected although in later years the Treasury assumed responsibility for the allocation of funds.

Increased transportation of freight by heavy road vehicles also increased the wear on roads and led first to a "wetted tax" for steam road locomotives, followed by the adoption of the recommendations of the Salter Report of 1933 for all heavy vehicles. This addressed a perception that the free use of roads was unfairly subsidising the railway's competitors, through the introduction of an additional axle weight duty within the VED in order to charge commercial motor vehicles for the costs they generated. There were exceptions for vehicles that seldom used public roads, such as agricultural tractors. This annual duty was payable by all road hauliers in proportion to the axle load and had the effect of removing many heavy steam-powered vehicles from the road. It was accompanied by changes in legislation that relieved local authorities of some of their costs through new abilities to set weight and speed limits.

The Road Fund was abolished on 1 April 1937 as a result of the Finance Act 1936, and motoring taxation being treated as general taxation since that date.

The Trunk Roads Act 1936 had transferred management of 4,500 miles (7,200 km) of major 'Trunk roads' to the Ministry of Transport.

=== 1937 – today ===
Since 1937 motoring taxation has been treated as 'general taxation' losing its direct connection to the funding of roads and motoring infrastructure.

The Smeed Report of 1962 suggested that "road users should pay the costs that he imposes upon others", including road costs (construction, maintenance, lighting), congestion (the delay the motorist causes to others) and social costs (risk, noise, fumes).

In March of the same year motoring organisations appealed to the Chancellor of the Exchequer to reduce the "disturbingly high cost of motoring" by cutting motoring taxation in the forthcoming budget. Between 1950 and 1961 motoring tax revenue rose from £131 million (£3.88 billion as of 2025) to £730 million (£14.2 billion as of 2025). By 1966, when taxation revenue reached £1 billion, the Royal Automobile Club were calling for an end to the "crippling spiral of motoring taxation", stating that less than one-third of the revenue was spent on road improvements.

Following extensive and politically damaging road protests in the UK during the early 1990s (including the M11 link road and Twyford Down) the Conservative government introduced the Fuel Price Escalator, which were automatic fuel tax increases above inflation with an objective to stem the increase in pollution from road transport and cut the need for new road building. The policy was retained by the incoming Labour government in 1997 and was withdrawn after the fuel protests of 2000.

Since 2002 policy cues have been given using the income tax system to encourage the purchase of company and personal cars with low emissions.

In March 2005, a graduated vehicle excise duty system, with tax bands based on CO_{2} ratings, was introduced as an incentive to purchase vehicles with lower emission ratings.

In 2012 the government announced that it was consulting on introducing HGV road user charging in order to ensure that foreign hauliers pay their fair share towards the upkeep of British roads.

In spite of these protests, the country's economy and motorists' behaviour has generally become less sensitive to the price of fuel at the pump, with economists now estimating it to have a price elasticity of approximately −0.24 (thus an economist would expect that a doubling of the fuel price would stop a quarter of journeys).

== Current taxes ==
=== Hydrocarbon oil duty ('fuel duty') ===
Hydrocarbon oil duty, commonly referred to as 'fuel duty' or 'fuel tax' is an excise duty levied on some fuels used by road vehicles in the United Kingdom. Tax is based on fuel volume, rather than as a percentage of the selling price. With the exception of gas, rates don't vary by fuel type. Some vehicles including local bus services, some farm and construction vehicles and aviation pay reduced or no fuel duty. A fuel duty rebate is available for Bus transport in the United Kingdom. In May 2008, UK fuel taxes were the highest in Europe.

The government revenue from fuel duties was £24.3 billion in the 2023-2024 fiscal year, which represents 2.3% of total income.

=== Vehicle excise duty ('car tax') ===
Vehicle Excise Duty, also commonly known as 'VED', 'vehicle tax', 'car tax' and 'road tax', is an annual vehicle road use tax levied as an excise duty which must be paid for most types of vehicle which are to be used (or parked) on the public roads in the United Kingdom. Motor vehicles used on public roads no longer need to display a current vehicle licence (tax disc) as proof of payment which will not be issued without prior proof that the vehicle has valid MOT and insurance. A 'Statutory Off Road Notification (SORN)' must be made for a registered vehicle that is not being used on the road, and which has been taxed since 31 January 1998.

VED was introduced in the 1888 budget; the current system, which applies specifically to motor vehicles was introduced in 1920 and was initially paid directly into the Road Fund which was ring-fenced for road construction until 1937, after which time it was treated as general taxation. Since 1999, the duty has been levied according to the CO_{2} emissions, starting with a reduced rate of £50, the scheme was extended into a graded system in 2001.

The duty raised £8.1 billion in the 2023–2024 fiscal year, representing 0.8% of total government income. Before 2025, electric vehicles were exempt from the car tax and from the additional tax for luxury vehicles. From 2025, electric cars would pay a small fee in the first year, whereas people with expensive EVs would pay the full luxury car supplement.

=== Vehicle first registration fee ===
The one-time fee charged by the Driver and Vehicle Licensing Agency for the compulsory registration of a motor vehicle which is to be used or kept on public roads.

=== Vehicles imports ===
Customs duties on some Grey import vehicles and vehicle components or spares from outside the EU may be assessed at an additional charge which is then subject to VAT.

=== Income tax ===
The value of a vehicle bought by a company for the dedicated use of its staff is treated as a taxable benefit for that individual, and assessed by HMRC with other income for income tax purposes. Until 2002 their financial benefit was assessed primarily based on price and mileage driven; this was then modified so that vehicles with lower emissions were assessed at a lower value than those with higher emissions. In addition, the taxable allowance for mileage using private cars has remained static.

A significant proportion of new vehicles are bought as company cars, thus this method of charging is not only aimed at encouraging companies to use "cleaner" vehicles, but, when sold on the second-hand market, these vehicles will filter through and raise the efficiency of the national 'fleet' .

== Road usage charges ==
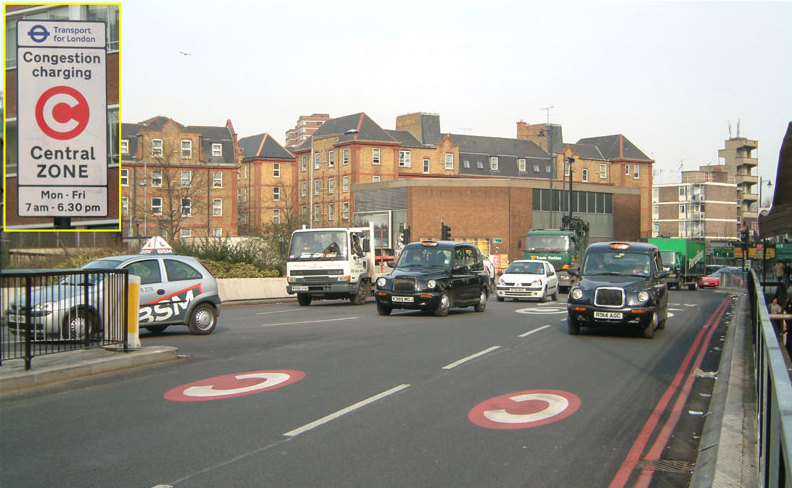
In London, street markings and a sign (inset) with the white-on-red C alert drivers to the charge.

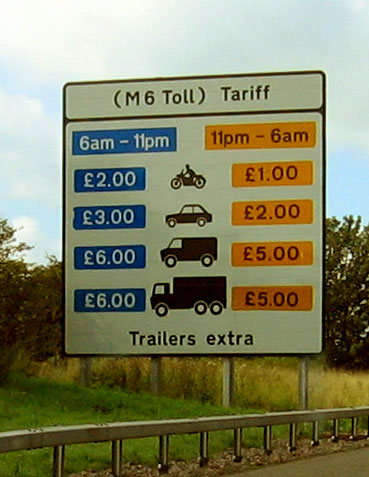
Prices for the M6 toll.

In London and in a small number of other places road usage charges in the form of road pricing, however these are generally viewed as 'usage charges' rather than as tax for legal purposes although this is disputed in relation to the London congestion charge by the US and some other countries.

=== London ===
The London congestion charge, which applied to most vehicles entering parts of Central London was introduced in 2003 with an extension into West London in 2007. The current daily charge is £15.00. The total receipts from the London Congestion Charge for 2006–07 was £213 million (provisional figures), which, after operating costs, left £123m of hypothecated revenue for London transport schemes.

Towards the end of 2006, the Mayor of London proposed the introduction of a variable congestion charge. Similarly to vehicle excise duty (VED), it would be based on emissions of carbon dioxide in grams/km. This would reduce or eliminate the charge for small and fuel-efficient vehicles, and increase it to up to £25 a day for large, inefficient vehicles such as SUVs, large saloons and compact MPVs with a Band G VED rating, that is, emissions of > 225 g/km of CO_{2}. Electric and hydrogen powered zero-emissions vehicles are already exempt from the charge.

The London low emission zone, a pollution charge scheme, was introduced between February 2008 and January 2012 covering nearly all of Greater London Payment of the LEZ charge is in addition to any congestion charge required.

=== Dartford crossing ===
In 2003 the Dartford Crossing construction debt was paid off, which had been expected to result in the scrapping of the toll fee to cross. However, the government decided to continue to charge most crossing users to keep congestion levels down. As with congestion charging schemes, all proceeds must be used for transport purposes. In one year this money amounted to £60 million.

=== M6 Toll road ===
The UK's first privately operated motorway opened in 2003. The M6 Toll (originally the Birmingham Northern Relief Road) is designed to relieve the M6 through Birmingham, which is one of the most heavily used roads in the country.

=== Other road usage fees ===
The Durham City congestion charge was introduced in 2002. Receipts from the scheme for financial year 2006–07 were £67,000.

There are only two toll roads which are public rights of way (Rye Road between Hoddesdon and Roydon and College Road, Dulwich) together with some five private toll-roads.

== Proposed taxes and charges ==
=== Road pricing ===
In 2005, the Government published proposals for a UK wide road pricing scheme. This was designed to be revenue neutral with other motoring taxes to be reduced to compensate. The plans have been extremely controversial with 1.8 million people signing a petition against them.

=== Workplace parking levy ===
Under the Transport Act 2000, local traffic authorities in England and Wales, outside London, may introduce a Workplace Parking Levy (WPL) to help tackle congestion in towns and cities.

In April 2012, Nottingham became the first city in the UK to introduce a WPL. The levy charges £350 on each parking space made available to employees at businesses with more than ten such parking spaces. The council have used the revenue of around £10 million a year to develop the city's tram system. There has been a 9% reduction in traffic and 15% increase in public transport use since the introduction of the levy.

=== Future tax revenue reduction ===
A 2012 study by the Institute for Fiscal Studies (IFS) funded by the RAC Foundation found that the government's drive to promote green vehicles with a lower carbon footprint could result in a significant loss of revenue from motoring taxes, estimated at £13 billion by 2029 at current prices, according to forecasts by the Office for Budget Responsibility. This revenue decline is partly due to improved vehicle efficiency and the growth of plug-in electric vehicles. Among the options available to the government to offset the loss, a further increase of the duty on petrol and diesel or the introduction of new taxes on alternative energy sources such as electricity for vehicles were considered. However, due to lack of popularity of the former and the risks of hindering the entire green vehicle strategy, the IFS study recommended to introduce a nationwide system of road pricing to charge drivers by distance driven, with higher pricing in congested areas at peak times, while reducing the existing motoring taxes. Under this strategy drivers in the countryside would be likely to pay less, as rural motorists are currently overtaxed according to the study.

=== Wolfson Economics Prize ===
The 2017 Wolfson Economics Prize was based on the question "How can we pay for better, safer, more reliable roads in a way that is fair to road users and good for the economy and the environment?”. It was won by Hungarian Gergely Raccuja with a proposal based on charging by distance to replace fuel duty and vehicle excise duty.

== See also ==
- Road pricing in the United Kingdom
- Toll roads in Great Britain
