= Reuben Smeed =

British statistician (1909–1976)

Reuben Jacob Smeed CBE (1909–1976) was a British statistician and transport researcher. He proposed Smeed's law which correlated traffic fatalities to traffic density and predicted that the average speed of traffic in central London would always be nine miles per hour without other disincentives, given that this was the minimum speed that people will tolerate.

He chaired the Smeed Report which reported to the Government of the United Kingdom on road pricing in 1964 which recommended introducing congestion pricing on busy roads. These recommendations were not taken up until the London congestion charge was finally introduced in 2003, when average traffic speeds across the congestion charging zone rose by 15% from 14 kilometres per hour (8.7 mph) in the year prior to introduction to 17 kilometres per hour (11 mph) immediately after its introduction, the highest average speed since 1974.

== Career ==
Smeed attended Central Foundation Boys' School, obtained a degree in mathematics and subsequently a PhD in aeronautical engineering from Queen Mary's College before entering academia as a teacher of mathematics.

At the start of World War II he was working for the Royal Aircraft Establishment on radio and radar equipment. In 1941 he assumed the rank of Wing Commander while he ran a small team in operations research for RAF Bomber Command looking at bomber losses. The team included Freeman Dyson. Whilst there he used statistics to verify the safest methods and formations for bombers and to investigate the effectiveness of various radar countermeasures, and by 1945 had become their Chief Research Officer.

In 1947 he joined the Traffic and Safety Division as Deputy Director at the Department of Scientific and Industrial Research (later the Transport Research Laboratory), where he investigated issues around traffic, road users, accidents, lighting and vehicle behaviour, pioneering the scientific study of transport studies. In so doing, he discovered a number of surprising or counter-intuitive features of road systems.

In 1949 he proposed Smeed's law, an empirical rule that broke the usual link between environmental factors and road crashes. Instead he correlated traffic fatalities to traffic density, as measured by the proxy of motor vehicle registrations and country population. He also proposed that the average speed of traffic in central London would always be nine miles per hour, because that is the minimum speed that people will tolerate. He claimed that his new designs for the linked use of traffic lights might increase the number of cars on the roads but would not increase their speed, because, as soon as the traffic flowed faster, more drivers would come to slow it down. Under his direction the TRL investigated many aspects of road safety and driver behaviour, publishing more than 50 papers.

In 1961 he wrote "The traffic problem in towns", published by the Manchester Statistical Society and then in 1962 he was commissioned to head an influential study into the benefits and feasibility of congestion pricing for urban road networks which resulted in the Smeed Report "Road Pricing: The Economic and Technical Possibilities" which was published by the Ministry of Transport in 1964.

Although it was initially well received, successive governments failed to act. He left the laboratory in frustration soon after the report's publication, joining the Ministry of Land and Natural Resources. He was appointed a CBE in 1966. In 1967 he became the first Professor of Traffic Studies at University College London where he taught until his death in 1976.

== Legacy ==
The Smeed prize has been awarded annually at the Annual Conference of the Universities' Transport Study Group "to recognise the best student paper and presentation".
