= Smeed Report =

1960s UK study into road pricing options

The Smeed Report (titled Road Pricing: The Economic and Technical Possibilities) was a study into alternative methods of charging for road use, commissioned by the UK government between 1962 and 1964 led by R. J. Smeed. The report stopped short of an unqualified recommendation for road pricing but supported congestion pricing for busy road networks.

== Team ==
The team was led by R. J. Smeed, the deputy director of the British Road Research Laboratory (RRL) and included 11 economists and engineers, including:

- Smeed, a noted statistician and transport planner, credited with identifying "Smeed's law" that describes motorists' tolerance towards speed and risk. He observed that drivers would not go out if traffic speeds fell below 9 mph; but if speeds rose, more would drive until they caused more congestion.
- Gabriel Roth, a noted road transport economist.
- Michael Edwin Beesley a pioneer of cost–benefit analysis techniques whose key innovation was the valuation that people give to their time.
- J. Michael Thompson, a transport economist.

== Background ==
The taxation system in operating at the time was based on the Salter Report into road and rail transportation from 1933.

== Conclusions ==
The principles laid down were that "The road user should pay the costs that he imposes upon others", namely the following:

- road costs (construction, maintenance, lighting)
- congestion (the delay the motorist causes to others)
- social costs (risk, noise, fumes)

The operational requirements should be the following:

- related to the amount of use made of the roads
- costs should vary according to the location, time, and type of vehicle
- cities should be zoned, with costs raising to 10 shillings per hour of driving in the centre of London or Cambridge
- costs should be stable and known in advance
- payment in advance of travel should be possible

The results of the radical study were reported into the then Ministry of Transport, indicating that the effect of speeding up congested traffic would benefit the country's economy by £100–£150M per annum. It would be possible and feasible to impose car user restraint strategies by charging through the metering of road usage, if the government had the will to do so.

Charging zones would be identified by clear signs on their boundaries; these could be electrical and thus be changed at various times of the day. A simple national colour-coded scheme could be used to indicate the charge rate in force at that time or to allow different charging zones to exist side by side.

They recognised that traditional toll collection methods would not be practical in city centres, where the road layout had not been designed to provide natural gateways into the tow, and where the demolition and land required for toll booths or toll plazas would be unacceptable.

Instead, they investigated charging through a daily licence system, managed either by a remote wireless automatic identification of the vehicle, or by a meter mounted inside the vehicle, which could track both driving charges and parking.

They recommended a tamper-proof credit or pre-payment meter inside the car, as with the technology available at the time, any external recording mechanism would require expensive equipment for tracking and book keeping and threaten the privacy of the vehicle users they tracked. A single metering system could be used in any British city centre that chose to adopt a charging zones.

There was also an economic analysis that showed that the largest part of the economic benefit from road pricing was not in the relief of congestion but in the revenue collected, which would only be released when the revenue is used. In the arguments that followed, the good that could come about by using the money from such a scheme was frequently overshadowed by a vision of the restraints and penalties levied on the motorist.

== Reactions ==
The report was received with ambivalence by the Macmillan government, which had commissioned it: the Ministry reported in June 1964 that it would first need to study the implications and thus the government was "therefore in no way committed to this form of restraint". It initially withheld release of the full report to the public and took its time to consider it. It was rumoured that the Prime Minister, Sir Alec Douglas-Home, had suggested to "take a vow that if we are re-elected we will never again set up a study like this one".

Events took over, and two elections were fought in 1964 and 1966 with transport as a major election issue, resulting in a new Wilson government with Barbara Castle as Minister of Transport. A large majority enabled her to bring into law a number of the then-controversial safety concepts that the RRL had been investigating, such as speed limits and breathalyzers. She appeared to become an advocate of road pricing per the Smeed Report and publicly criticised the construction of new urban motorways as "self-defeating", during a tour of US cities, slowing down the UK's future urban road building programme as a consequence.

However, the political will needed to establish such a scheme seemed to be slipping away, and commitment atrophied in the UK as the minister requested more feasibility reports, until, in 1970, the government changed and the scheme effectively died.

The Smeed committee members had already become frustrated and moved on. In 1966, Smeed was appointed Professor of Traffic Studies at University College London (UCL) and formed the then Research Group in Traffic Studies, which grew to become the present Centre for Transport Studies at UCL within the University of London Centre for Transport Studies. The chair of the parallel and quasi-competing committee, Professor Sir Colin Buchanan took up a post as professor of transport at Imperial College in 1963. Roth, one of the authors of the report, acrimoniously left the country to join the World Bank in 1967, citing the delays and the mutation of the pricing scheme from an enabling investment-raising mechanism into a method of restriction.

== Legacy ==
The Smeed Report remained influential elsewhere, with economist Maurice Allais following up this work in 1965 with a report for the EEC that recommended rail and road privatisation to allow the operation of free market forces across Europe's roads and railways, and with the Adam Smith Institute who encouraged Roth to revisit his earlier analysis in 1992, when he noted that "the idea of charging for the use of congested roads is still hypersensitive, and many politicians avoid the subject studiously."

After Roth analysed its congestion problems for the World Bank Singapore adopted many of the ideas originally identified in the Smeed Report, introducing its first Restricted Zone in 1975. It uses a variable Electronic Road Pricing structure on expressways and through gateways into the central business district with pricing based on time and congestion levels. It aims to reduce congestion, encourage the use of public transport, car pooling, less congested alternative routes and different times of travel.

A cordon based charging scheme has also been running in the city centre of Oslo, Norway since 1990. However, this differs in some key respects from Smeed's scheme, as it relies on a system of 19 wireless AutoPASS-enabled entrypoints with toll booths, and it was not designed as a congestion charge. Instead it is a hypothecated tax or fund-raising mechanism to pay for new roads, in the first instance, and public transport more latterly.

It was not until 2002 that the principle was re-adopted in Britain, with legislation passed to allow the first schemes to be implemented in Durham and then London, with consideration given to a national road pricing system.

Research by the likes of Lewis and Mogridge were better able to formulate the observation that the more roads are built, the more traffic there is to fill these roads. Combined with the visible effects of growing levels of traffic, this developed the intellectual argument upon which to consider introducing new methods of charging.

== See also ==
- Road pricing in the United Kingdom
