= Road Haulage Association =

Trade association in the UK

The Road Haulage Association Ltd (RHA) is the UK’s largest dedicated trade association representing HGV, coach and van operators.

As a trade association, the RHA is responsible for campaigning, advice, training, information and business services and products for its members and others within the commercial goods and passenger sectors, including audits, risk assessments and contracts of employment.

The RHA has featured in the Sunday Times Best places to work 2024, 2025 and 2026, won a SME Business and Trade Association Award in 2025 and was shortlisted for the Media Campaign of the Year Award in 2026 for its work on its freight crime campaign.

The RHA head office is located in Peterborough, and other offices are found in Bathgate and Cleckheaton. It currently has approximately 8,500 members who, between them, operate around 100,000 commercial vehicles.

The RHA is also the publisher of the magazine Roadway.

The RHA supports the independent charity the RHA Benevolent Fund which provides help for people and their families with a connection to the road transport industry when times are tough.

It has been the holder of the Defence Employer Recognition Scheme (ERS) Silver Award since 2020 which recognises the RHA's ongoing support for the recruitment and employment of veterans, reservists and forces families within the road transport and logistics sector.

The RHA has been accredited as a "diabetes safe" workplace through the DSO since 2025.

The current managing director of the RHA is Richard Smith.

== History ==
A previous iteration of the RHA existed from 1932 to 1935, and had 9,000 members. This was renamed the Associated Road Operators, which went on to merge with the Commercial Motor Users’ Association in 1945 and form what is the Road Haulage Association today.

In 1948, the RHA published RHD20, a rate schedule for its members, which was followed up in 1960 by the Black Book – The Long Distance Rates Guide. This was a publication with around 140,000 recommended rates for hauliers. The passing of the Restrictive Trade Practices Act 1974, however, meant that the RHA could no longer make recommendations to members on how rates should be increased to match costs, and the Black Book was discontinued.

== Campaigns ==
Some of the campaigns that the RHA has been involved with on behalf of its members include:

Increasing Speed Limits – In 2015, the speed limit for vehicles weighing over 7.5 tonnes was increased from 40 mph to 50 mph.

HGV Road User Levy – The HGV Road User Levy Act 2013, which aimed to reduce the taxation gap between UK and foreign-registered vehicles, introduced a levy requiring foreign HGVs to pay to use the UK road network.

Fuel Duty and Fuel Pressures – An alliance with Fair Fuel UK which aimed to change HM Treasury's stance on road-fuel duty. The campaign resulted in an annual saving of £6,000 per average 44-tonne truck. In 2026 the RHA has been leading the campaign and communications in response to fuel price and supply pressures linked to instability in the Middle East, positioning the issue as a wider economic and resilience concern. This includes a sustained national national media and social media campaign and clear messaging to government on the need to prioritise essential road transport operators in the road freight, coach and van sectors in any disruptions to fuel supply. They have also campaigned for an essential user rebate to support operators.

Love The Lorry (now National Lorry Week) – Launched in 2015 with a function at the House of Commons, and has now become National Lorry Week. It is a campaign with is an annual series of events aimed at educating school-age children, promoting a career in logistics for students, and raising awareness of the industry that delivers 85% of the economy to the general public.

National Coach Week - Launched in 2022 as the UK’s first dedicated campaign to promote the coach sector, National Coach Week is an annual campaign aimed at raising awareness of the vital role coaches play in connecting communities, supporting tourism and contributing over £6 billion annually to the UK economy. It also promotes careers in the sector and engages policymakers to strengthen recognition of the industry’s value.

Freight Crime - An ongoing campaign, which has brought national attention to the growing issue of goods theft from lorries and supply chains highlighting it as a major organised crime and economic concern. The campaign generated widespread media coverage, influenced parliamentary debate, contributed to the introduction of a Private Member’s Bill and mobilised members to drive meaningful engagement with policy makers. The media campaign was shortlisted for an award in 2026.

90/180 and EES - The RHA has also been leading work on the impact of the 90/180 rule and the introduction of the EU Entry/Exit System (EES), highlighting the operational challenges for HGV, coach and van operators . This includes raising awareness with policymakers and the media, and calling for practical solutions such as a Professional Drivers’ Exemption to minimise disruption to cross-border transport.
