= Road pricing in the United Kingdom =

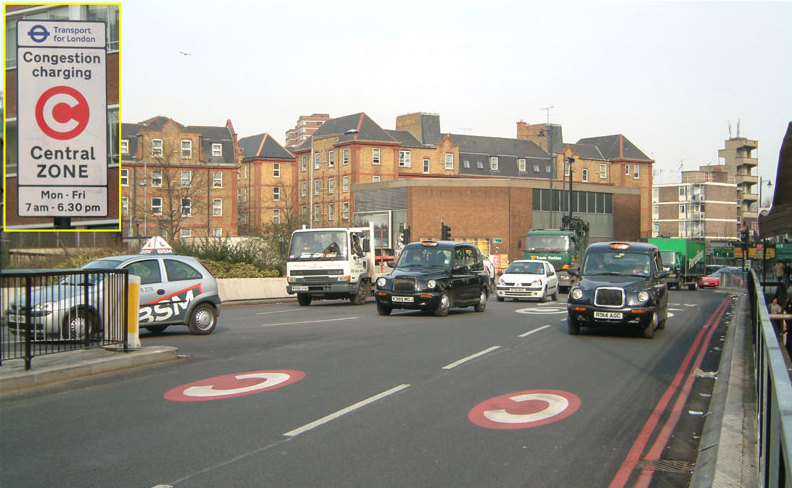
Entering the London congestion charge At Old Street with road markings, showing inset Sign.

Road pricing in the United Kingdom used to be limited to conventional tolls in some bridges, tunnels and also for most major roads during the period of the turnpike trusts. The term road pricing itself only came into common use however with publication of the Smeed Report in 1964 which considered how to implement congestion charging in urban areas as a transport demand management method to reduce traffic congestion.

Road pricing schemes in place in the UK as of 2019 include road congestion pricing in London and Durham; the London low emission zone which is a pollution charge scheme only affecting trucks with less efficient engines entering London; the London Ultra Low Emission Zone, a pollution charge scheme affecting all vehicles with less efficient engines entering London; and the M6 toll, the only existing toll road on a strategic road in the UK. The Dartford crossings toll was retained as a demand management tool in 2003.

The various local and any national road pricing schemes were promoted by the 1997–2010 Labour government which were then abandoned following strong public opposition. A heavy goods vehicle (HGV) road user charging scheme had been proposed by the 2010–2015 coalition government together with a suggested new ownership and financing model to fund new road construction.

== History ==
In the 1960s the Smeed Report considered how to implement congestion charging.

In September 2002, the Durham congestion charge, England's first congestion charging scheme was introduced. It was restricted to a single road in that city, with a £2 charge. In 2003 the London congestion charge was introduced.

In November 2003, Secretary of State for Transport Alistair Darling said that despite apparent initial interest from many city councils, including those of Leeds, Cardiff, Manchester, Birmingham and Bristol, no city apart from Edinburgh had yet approached the Government for assistance in introducing a charge.

The Western Extension of the London congestion charge was introduced in 2007 (and withdrawn on 1 January 2011).

In July 2008, the Drivers' Alliance was established, an organisation which has subsequently campaigned against the introduction of a number of schemes.

== Design considerations ==
=== Finance models ===
There are no multiple zones in operation in the UK; when it was decided to extend congestion charging from central London to include the West End of London, there was some discussion about having two zones running side-by-side. However, the Western zone was introduced by simply extending the area of the earlier London zone and use the same charges and conditions for simplicity.

Edinburgh seriously considered a two-cordon road pricing scheme but rejected it in 2005 after a public referendum.

Tolls and Shadow tolls.

=== Metering and billing ===
The Durham scheme uses an automated toll booth, while London uses a remote system based on CCTV and automatic number plate recognition.

The costs of tracking and billing are very large; for the remote monitoring of the London scheme the majority of the income raised is absorbed by the costs. There are suggestions that a wireless "tag and beacon" scheme could be introduced as a potentially better and cheaper alternative.

=== Privacy ===
Although the more recent Data Protection Act now gives a framework for the responsible collection of personal data in the UK, the privacy concerns identified in the Smeed report were not addressed by the London scheme, with fears expressed over mass surveillance and abuse of the systems.

== Current schemes ==
Road pricing

- Durham congestion charge (2002)
- London congestion charge, (2003)
- London low emission zone introduced between 2008 and 2012 for commercial vehicles with older or less clean engines
- London ultra low emission zone, introduced in 2019 for all vehicles with older or less clean engines
- Dartford Crossing, which was converted from a traditional toll to a congestion charge in 2003.
- Birmingham Clean Air Zone, activated from 1 June 2021, with charges for high emission vehicles.

There are also the following traditional toll roads in Great Britain in operation: M6 Toll, Clifton Suspension Bridge, Humber Bridge, Mersey Tunnels, Tyne Tunnel and a few others on more minor roads.

== Proposed schemes ==
=== HGV road user charging ===
In 2012 the government announced that it was consulting on introducing a heavy goods vehicle (HGV) road user charging scheme, known as the 'HGV Road User Levy' in order to ensure that foreign hauliers make a contribution towards the upkeep of British roads.

The HGV Road User Levy Bill, legislation to introduce a time based charging scheme, was brought into Parliament in October 2012, and subsequently passed, receiving Royal Assent in February 2013. The levy scheme will charge all HGVs weighing 12,000 kg or more is due to be introduced from April 2014. Under the scheme, the largest heaviest vehicles will pay up to £10 per day, or £1,000 per year to use roads in the UK.

The levy was suspended in August 2020 as a measure to support hauliers affected by the coronavirus pandemic, but levy payments will be resumed on 1 August 2023.

=== New ownership and financing models (2012) ===
In a speech in April 2012 the Prime Minister, David Cameron spoke of the urgent need to fund more road construction, proposing road tolling for new roads as one answer. He also mentioned the possibility of shadow tolls and new ownership and financing models. Shadow tolls are fees paid to a road maintenance company per driver using a road, but the fees are paid by the government rather than drivers.

=== Nationwide road pricing (2012) ===
A 2012 study by the Institute for Fiscal Studies (IFS) funded by the RAC Foundation found that the government's drive to promote green vehicles with a lower carbon footprint could result in a significant loss of revenue from motoring taxes, estimated at £13 billion by 2029 at current prices, according to forecasts by the Office for Budget Responsibility. This revenue decline is partly due to improved vehicle efficiency and the growth of plug-in electric vehicles. Among the options available to the government to offset the loss, a further increase of the duty on petrol and diesel or the introduction of new taxes on alternative energy sources such as electricity for vehicles were considered. However, due to lack of popularity of the former and the risks of hindering the entire green vehicle strategy, the IFS study recommended to introduce a nationwide system of road pricing to charge drivers by each mile driven, with higher pricing in congested areas at peak times, while reducing the existing motoring taxes. Under this strategy drivers in the countryside would be likely to pay less, as rural motorists are currently overtaxed according to the study.

=== Road charging by the Welsh Government (2021) ===
In January 2021, the Welsh Government consulted on introducing possible charges on trunk roads and motorways across Wales as part of their White Paper on a Clean Air (Wales) Bill. The charges would likely apply across Wales and apply numerous emissions-based charges across numerous vehicle categories. The bill directly gives both local authorities and the Welsh Government powers to introduce charging schemes on different roads across Wales. This has, however, met strong opposition from the Welsh Conservative Party, of whom disagree with all possible toll charges being applied on Welsh roads and has been a strong point in their 2021 Senedd election campaign, especially in North Wales.

== Earlier proposals ==
=== HGV Road user charging (2000–2005) ===
The Labour administration first proposed HGV road user charging in 2000 with encouragement for the Conservative opposition. A Treasury progress report was published in 2002 followed by a second report in 2003. In 2005 the government announced that it was halting the development of the scheme and would be progressing with the development of a National road pricing scheme covering all vehicles, a scheme which was itself abandoned in 2009.

Primary legislation, titled 'The Heavy Goods Vehicles (Charging for the Use of Certain Infrastructure on the Trans-European Road Network was however enacted in 2009' in response to an EU Directive.

=== Local schemes 2005–2008 ===
Edinburgh 2005

Edinburgh City Council proposed a congestion zone, but this was rejected in a postal referendum by around 75% of voters in Edinburgh. Unlike in London, where Ken Livingstone had sufficient devolved powers to introduce the charge on his own authority, other cities would require the confirmation of the Secretary of State for Transport. Manchester proposed a peak time congestion charge scheme which would have been implemented in 2011/2012. This was rejected in a referendum held on 12 December 2008 by over 70% of voters. Plans for similar charges in both the West Midlands and East Midlands have also been rejected. The government has proposed a nationwide scheme of road tolls, but public opposition has been fierce and included a petition of nearly 2 million signatories on the 10 Downing Street website. In an article in the Sunday Times in December 2007, the author describes how he believes that the failure of the London scheme, in terms of value for money, could undermine the Government's desire to convince other parts of the UK to introduce similar schemes.

The scheme was rejected in a public referendum in February 2005.

Manchester 2007

A scheme similar to the one in London was proposed in Manchester, covering a wider area but with a much smaller daily charging window covering the morning and evening rush hours. However, this was overwhelmingly rejected when voted upon in Greater Manchester.

Cambridge 2007

A scheme for Cambridge is currently under consideration and the subject of heated public debate, with council surveys showing that a majority of Cambridge-area residents reject the scheme.

==== West Midlands 2008 ====
In March 2008, councils from across the West Midlands, including those from Birmingham and Coventry, rejected the idea of imposing road pricing schemes on the area, this was despite promises from central government of transport project funding in exchange for the implementation of a road pricing pilot scheme.

East Midlands 2008

Similar schemes proposed for cities in the East Midlands have also been dropped.

=== National road pricing proposal (2005–2007) ===
Extensive studies were done in 2005 related to a proposed national scheme for the UK, with an aim to implementation at the earliest around 2013. In October 2005 the UK government suggested they explore "piggy-backing" road pricing on private sector technologies, such as usage based insurance (also known as pay-as-you-drive, or PAYD). This method would avoid a large-scale public sector procurement exercise, but such products are unlikely to penetrate the mass market.

If introduced, this scheme would likely see a charge being levied per mile depending on the time of day, the road being driven along, and perhaps the type of vehicle. For example, a large car driving along the western section of the M25 in rush hour would pay a high charge; a small car driving along a rural lane would pay a much lower charge. The very highest charges would be likely in the most congested urban areas.

It is expected that rural motorists would benefit the most from such a scheme, perhaps by paying less through road pricing than they do at present through petrol and car taxes, whereas urban motorists would pay much more than they presently do. However, this is highly dependent on whether such a scheme would be designed to be either revenue neutral or congestion neutral. A revenue neutral scheme would replace (at least in part) petrol and vehicle taxes, and would be such that Treasury revenue under the new scheme would equal the revenue from current taxes. A congestion neutral scheme would be designed so that growth in congestion levels would stop as a result of the new charges; the latter scheme would require significantly higher (and increasingly higher) charges than the revenue neutral scheme and so would be unpopular with the UK's 30 million motorists.

The carbon emission consequence of moving from fuel duty to a charge per mile has been raised as a concern by some environmentalists, as has any diversionary response from heavily trafficked (and hence more expensive) roads. The UK government announced funding for road pricing research in seven local areas in November 2005.

In June 2005, Transport Secretary Alistair Darling announced the current proposals to introduce road pricing. Every vehicle would be fitted with a satellite receiver to calculate charges, with prices (including fuel duty) ranging from 2p per mile on un-congested roads to £1.34 on the most congested roads at peak times.

A 2007 online petition against road pricing attracted over 1.8 million signatures, equivalent to 6% of the entire driving population. Over 150,000 signatures were added during the last day before the petition closed on 20 February 2007. In reply, the prime minister e-mailed the petitioners outlining his rationale, denying that the proposals were to introduce a stealth tax or increase surveillance, and promising 'debate' before a decision was made as to whether to introduce a national scheme. Also, in a recent poll 74% of those questioned opposed road pricing.

== See also ==
- Toll roads in Great Britain
- Roads in the United Kingdom
- Motoring taxation in the United Kingdom
- Turnpike trust (an article about the Turnpike trusts in Great Britain of the 17th-19th centuries
- Road pricing
- Congestion pricing
