= Road pricing =

Methods of generating revenue from road users

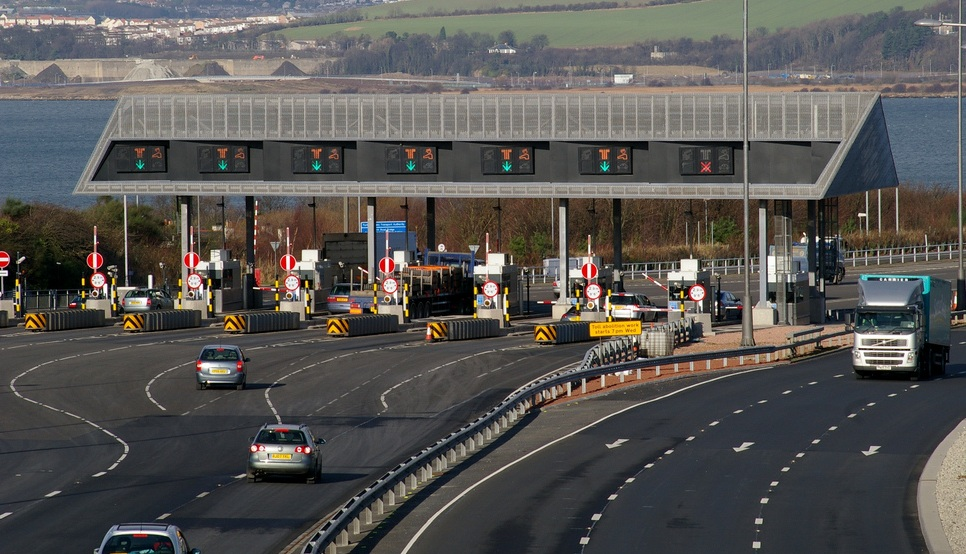
A toll plaza in the United Kingdom

Road pricing are direct charges levied for the use of roads, including road tolls, distance or time-based fees, congestion charges and charges designed to discourage the use of certain classes of vehicle, fuel sources or more polluting vehicles. These charges may be used primarily for revenue generation, usually for road infrastructure financing, or as a transportation demand management tool to reduce peak hour private vehicle travel and the associated traffic congestion or other social and environmental negative externalities associated with road travel such as air pollution, greenhouse gas emissions, visual intrusion, noise pollution and road traffic collisions.

In most countries toll roads, toll bridges and toll tunnels are often used primarily for revenue generation to repay long-term debt issued to finance the toll facility, or to finance capacity expansion, operations, and maintenance of the facility itself, or simply as general tax funds. Road congestion pricing for entering an urban area, or pollution charges levied on vehicles with higher tailpipe emissions are typical schemes implemented to price externalities. The application of congestion charges is currently limited to a small number of cities and urban roads, and the notable schemes include the Electronic Road Pricing in Singapore, the London congestion charge, the Stockholm congestion tax, the Milan Area C, and high-occupancy toll lanes in the United States. Examples of pollution pricing schemes include the London low emission zone and the discontinued Ecopass in Milan. In some European countries there is a period-based charge for the use of motorways and expressways, based on a vignette or sticker attached to a vehicle, and in a few countries vignettes are required for the use of any road. Mileage-based usage fees (MBUF) or distance-based charging has been implemented for heavy vehicles based on truck weight and distance traveled in New Zealand (called RUC), Switzerland (LSVA), Germany (LKW-Maut), Austria (Go-Maut), Czech Republic, Slovakia, Poland, and in four U.S. states: Oregon, New York, Kentucky, and New Mexico.

Many recent road pricing schemes have proved controversial, with a number of high-profile schemes in the US and the UK being cancelled, delayed, or scaled back in response to opposition and protest. The tendency seems to reverse, however, when the system is already in place, with the popularity of existing systems often increasing while merely discussed systems face an uphill battle in public opinion. A 2006 survey of the economic literature on the subject finds that most economists agree that some form of road pricing to reduce congestion is economically viable and overall beneficial, although there is disagreement on what form road pricing should take. Economists disagree over how to set tolls, how to cover common costs, and what to do with any "excess" revenues (i.e., Revenues that exceed direct costs of road construction and maintenance, but which may still not cover external costs fully), whether and how "losers" from tolling previously free roads should be compensated, and whether to privatize highways.

== Terminology ==
Road pricing is a general term that may be used for any system where the driver pays directly for use of a particular roadway or road network in a particular city, region, or nation. Road pricing also includes congestion charging, which are charges levied on qualifying road users to reduce peak demand, and thereby reduce traffic congestion and also to place a charge on road users for other negative externalities, including traffic accidents, noise, air pollution, and greenhouse gas emissions.

== History ==
The first published reference to 'road pricing' was possibly in 1949 when the RAND Corporation proposed "use of direct road pricing to make freight journeys more expensive on congested routes or to influence the time of day at which freight traffic operates". Nobel-laureate William Vickrey then built on the ideas of the economist Arthur Pigou, outlining a theoretical case for road pricing in a major work on the subject of 1955 proposing in 1959 that drivers should be charged by electronic means for use of busy urban roads. Arthur Pigou had previously developed the concept of economic externalities in a publication of 1920 in which he proposed that what is now referred to as a Pigouvian tax equal to the negative externality should be used to bring the outcome within a market economy back to economic efficiency.

In 1963 Vickery published a paper 'Pricing in urban and suburban transport' in the American Economic Review and Gabriel Joseph Roth, John Michael Thomson of the Department of Applied Economics at the University of Cambridge published a short paper titled "Road pricing, a cure for congestion?" The Smeed Report, 'Road Pricing: The Economic and Technical Possibilities', which had been commissioned in 1962 by the United Kingdom Ministry of Transport, was published in 1964. Road pricing was then developed by Maurice Allais and Gabriel Roth in a paper titled "The Economics of Road User Charges" published by the World Bank in 1968.

The first successful implementation of a congestion charge was with the Singapore Area Licensing Scheme in 1976. The Electronic Road Pricing (Hong Kong) scheme operated as a trial between 1983 and 1985 but was not continued permanently due to public opposition. A number of road tolling schemes were then introduced in Norway between 1986 and 1991 in Bergen, Oslo, and the Trondheim Toll Scheme. It was noticed that the Oslo scheme had the unintended effect of reducing traffic by around 5%. The Singapore scheme was expanded in 1995 and converted to use a new electronic tolling system in 1998 and renamed Electronic Road Pricing. The first use of a road toll for access by low-occupancy vehicles to high-occupancy vehicle lane was introduced in the U.S. on California State Route 91 in 1995. Since 2000, other schemes have been introduced, although the New York congestion pricing proposal and a number of UK proposals were not progressed due to public opposition. In France road pricing came about as an unintended consequence of the way highways are built and financed as most are built by for-profit companies which earn back their expense through tolls. Some other European countries also have similar schemes either on parts of their highway network or only on particularly expensive roads such as tunnels, bridges, or mountain range crossings.

== Impact ==
A study of congestion pricing in Stockholm between 2006 and 2010 found that in the absence of congestion pricing Stockholm's "air would have been five to ten percent more polluted between 2006 and 2010, and young children would have suffered 45 percent more asthma attacks".

A 2013 study found that after congestion pricing was implemented in Seattle, drivers reported greater satisfaction with the routes covered by congestion pricing and reported lower stress.

A 2016 study found that more people used public transportation due to the implementation of congestion pricing in Singapore. A 2016 study found that real estate prices dropped by 19% within the cordoned-off areas of Singapore where congestion pricing was in place relative to the areas outside of the area.

Research from 2019 provides a set of tools to enable analysis and measurement of the impacts of toll pricing, toll payment, toll collection technology, and other aspects of toll implementation and rate changes on low-income and minority populations.

== Example schemes ==
=== Asia-Pacific ===
==== Australia ====
In January 2009, variable tolls were implemented at Sydney Harbour Bridge, two weeks after upgrading to 100% free-flow electronic toll collection. The highest fees are charged during the morning and afternoon peak periods; a toll 25% lower applies for the shoulder periods; and a toll lower than the previously existing is charged at nights, weekends, and public holidays. This is Australia's first road congestion pricing scheme, and has had only a very minor effect on traffic levels, reducing them by 0.19%

==== China ====
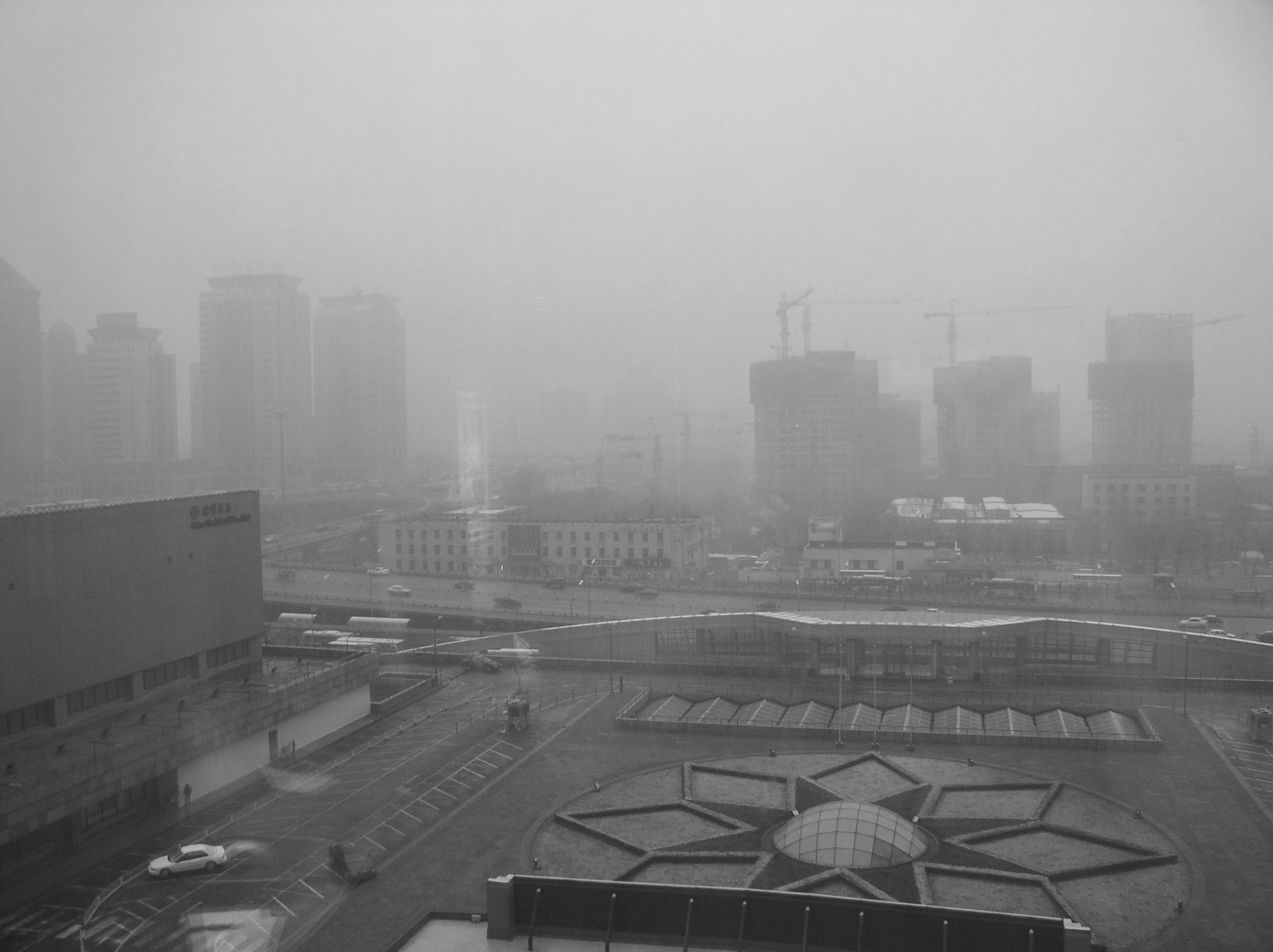
High air pollution day in Beijing

Main roadways and highways in Shanghai are tolled, and an assessment was completed to evaluate the implementation of congestion pricing for vehicles entering the central business district. The city also restrains car use, ownership and there are restrictions on getting a driver's license; since 1998, the number of new car registrations is limited to 50,000 vehicles a year, and car registrations are sold by public auction, with prices reaching up to US$5,000 in 2006. Parking is also limited.

Congestion based pricing for Beijing was recommended by the World Bank in 2010 and local officials announced plans to introduce a scheme in September 2011 although no details about the cost or the charge zone have been provided. The city is dealt with traffic congestion and air pollution through a driving restriction scheme implemented since the 2008 Summer Olympics. As of June 2016, another 11 Chinese cities have similar restriction schemes in place.

In early 2010 the city Guangzhou, Guangdong province, opened a public discussion on whether to introduce congestion charges. An online survey conducted by two local news outlets found that 84.4% of respondents opposed the charges. The city of Nanjing is also considering the implementation of congestion pricing.

In December 2015, the Beijing Municipal Commission of Transport announced plans to introduce congestion charges in 2016. According to the city's motor vehicle emission control plan 2013–2017, the congestion charge will be a real-time variable pricing scheme based on actual traffic flows and emissions data, and allow the fee to be charged for different vehicles and vary by time of the day and for different districts. The Dongcheng and Xicheng are among the districts that are most likely to first implement congestion charges. Vehicle emissions account for 31% of the city's smog sources, according to Beijing Environmental Protection Bureau. The local government has implemented already several policies to address air quality, and congestion, such as a driving restriction scheme based upon the last digits on their license plates. Also a vehicle quota system was introduced in 2011, awarding new car licenses through a lottery, with a ceiling of 6 million units set by the city authority for 2017. In May 2016, the Beijing city legislature announced it will consider starting levying traffic congestion charges by 2020 as part of a package of measures to reform the vehicle quota system. As of June 2016, the city's environmental and transport departments are working together on a congestion pricing proposal.

==== Hong Kong ====
Hong Kong's Electronic Road Pricing system operated between 1983 and 1985 with positive results. Public opposition stalled its permanent implementation. Proposals were however raised again in 2012.

==== Singapore ====
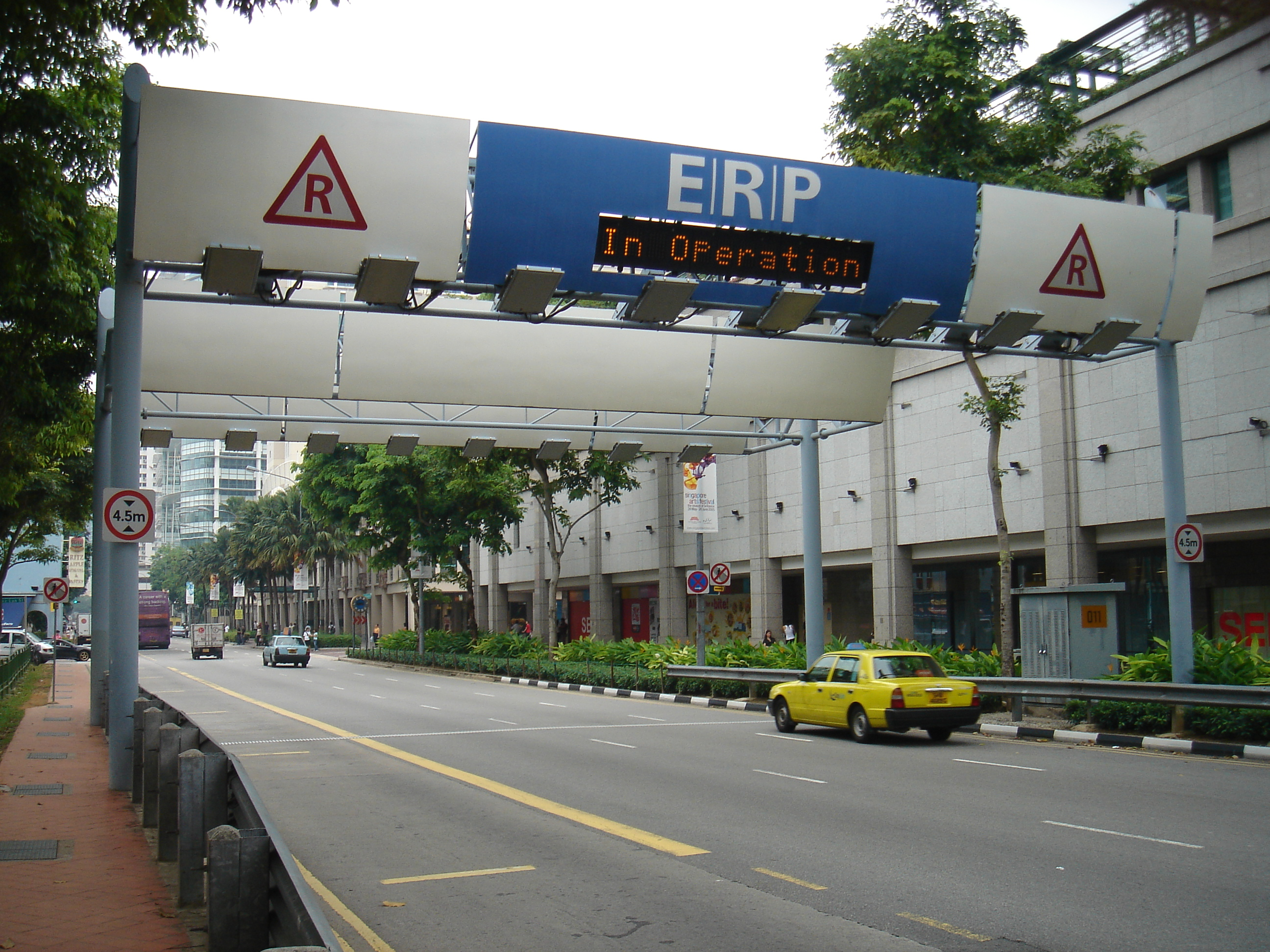
Electronic Road Pricing Gantry at North Bridge Road, Singapore

The world's first congestion pricing scheme was introduced in Singapore's core central business district in 1975 as the Singapore Area Licensing Scheme. It was extended in 1995 and converted to 100% free-flowing Electronic Road Pricing in September 1998. Variable pricing based on congestion levels was introduced in 2007. It is one of a number of elements in their Transportation Demand Management, which also includes high annual road tax, custom duties and vehicle registration fees for new vehicles, a quota system for new vehicles and heavy investment in public transportation. Singapore has one of the highest per capita incomes in Asia, but fewer than 30% of Singaporean households own cars.

=== Europe ===
Road sign for toll road for heavy trucks

==== Austria ====
A distance-based charging scheme called Go-Maut was implemented in Austria for all vehicles over 3.5 tonnes on motorways in 2004. In addition, all vehicles under 3.5 tonnes are required to buy a sticker or vignette to access the Austrian motorway network, which is owned and operated by a state-owned company called ASFINAG. The vignette enables the vehicle to use almost the entire motorway network in Austria for a specific period of time, with the lower charge set at €8 for 10 days. However, there is an additional toll charge for selected routes, such as long tunnels and expensive routes through the Alps.

==== Belarus ====
See Toll roads in Belarus.

==== Finland ====
The only Finnish town to suffer serious road congestion is Helsinki, built on a narrow peninsula. In the 1980s and 1990s, the City Administration was already proposing tolls on vehicles entering the centre but the Chamber of Commerce successfully resisted these. Road pricing was taken up in the central government programme in 2011 when the coalition members committed themselves to examine "the introduction of GPS-based road user charges". Transport minister Merja Kyllönen set up a working group to study "road user charging systems" in October 2012. The Ministry was committed to the architecture of the European Electronic Toll Service.

In March 2013, an independent Finnish policy institute recommended a market-based road pricing architecture for Europe. The roads needed for a journey could be pre-booked, the price of "slots" rising as the roads to be used approached capacity. The price would become payable at the scheduled time of departure unless the slot holder resold the slot before then. Casual motorists without bookings would be charged the current price. The paper proposed that Finland, having no serious road congestion to address, could serve as a testbed for road charging mechanisms.

The Transport Ministry's working group reported in December 2013 that a tax proportional to road use would implement transport and environment policies better than current fixed taxes on motoring, although collection costs would be many times higher. The focus of transport policy should be on solving capacity problems by managing demand rather than by building new infrastructure. However, it argued that buses and lorries should be exempted from road use charges on the grounds that the rise in costs could not be offset by cutting other heavy vehicle road taxes, which were already close to the minimum set in the EU's vignette directive. For private cars, the report looked at the implications of fixed and regional kilometre charges but did not consider market or other methods for responding to varying local congestion. Before the adoption of any system, it proposed broad trials to establish the technical viability of taxing road use, its enforceability, and the protection of privacy.

==== Germany ====
The LKW-MAUT distance-based charging scheme large goods vehicles in Germany began operation on 1 January 2005 after a two-year delay with prices varying depending on emission levels and the number of axles. The scheme, which combining satellite technology with other technologies and is operated by Toll Collect, suffered delays before implementation.

==== Ireland ====
Toll roads are common in Ireland for motorways and bridges/tunnels, with 11 toll roads in existence as of 2019.

In the 18th and 19th Centuries Turnpike trusts managed the roadways. However, with the onset of railways, the use of roads become far less popular, and tolling was abolished.

The first modern road charging scheme was introduced in 1984 on the East Link, a bascule lift bridge in Dublin's docklands, constructed by National Toll Roads (NTR) under a public-private partnership concession. This was followed by the West-Link bridge in 1990, similarly a concession to NTR. However, despite the opening of a second bridge in 2003, capacity and toll management of the West-Link was woefully inadequate, resulting in massive congestion on the Dublin M50 ring road. In 2007, the government bought out NTR's concession and introduced barrier-free tolling in order to end the jams.

In order to fund long-distance motorway construction in the mid-2000s, a new PPP model of DBOF (design, build, operate and finance PPP) concessions was adopted. International construction companies primarily backed these. The first such toll motorway was the M4/M6 operated by Spanish company Ferrovial, followed by routes such as the Eurolink M3 toll (a joint venture of Ferrovial and Irish company SIAC Construction), the M8 Fermoy bypass (owned by private equity and investment companies such as TIIC Group of Portugal, Aberdeen Standard Investments and 3I) and the M7/M9 Mid Link route owned by the Dutch company BAM and Spanish ACS Group). However, the onset of the 2008 financial crisis towards the end of the decade and the resulting Post-2008 Irish economic downturn saw a large drop off in driving and use of tolls. No new toll routes have been proposed since the economic downturn. However, a model of PPP shadow-tolling has been adopted to build routes such as the M18.

==== Italy ====
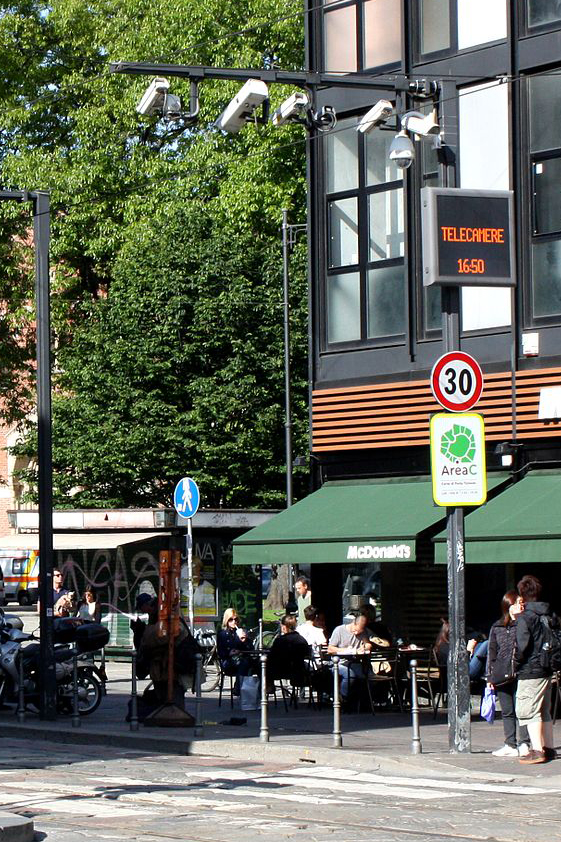
Entrance to Milan Area C

Rome converted a residents' pass system for the core of the city to a road pricing system in 2001 and Genoa started a trial system in 2003.

The Milan "Ecopass" system began operation in early 2008 with the objective to reduce air pollution from vehicles. It was extended several times before being replaced by Area C, a conventional congestion pricing scheme covering the same geographic area in January 2012. Electric vehicles, public utilities' vehicles, police and emergency vehicles, buses, and taxis are exempted from the charge. Hybrid electric and bi-fuel natural gas vehicles (CNG and LPG) will be exempted until 1 January 2013.

The scheme was made permanent in March 2013. All net earnings from Area C are invested to promote sustainable mobility and policies to reduce air pollution, including the redevelopment, protection, and development of public transport, "soft mobility" (pedestrians, cycling, Zone 30), and systems to rationalize the distribution of goods.

==== Malta ====
The automated 'Controlled Vehicular Access' (CVA) system was launched in Malta's capital city of Valletta on 1 May 2007. The number of vehicles entering the city reduced from 10,000 to 7,900; there has also been a 60% drop in car stays by non-residents of more than eight hours with a marked increase of 34% in non-residential cars visiting the city for an hour or less.

==== Norway ====
Norway implemented electronic urban tolling on the main road corridors into Bergen (1986), Oslo (1990), and then the Trondheim Toll Scheme the following year. The Bergen scheme operated as a cordon on all entry points to the central area of the city. The Oslo scheme was initially created as a conventional road toll for revenue generation reasons but had the unintended effect of reducing traffic by around 5%. Charges vary by time of the day. Parliament approved the legal basis for introducing congestion charging fee in 2001 In October 2011 the Norwegian government announced the introduction of rules allowing congestion charging in cities. The measure is intended to cut greenhouse gas and air pollutant emissions, and relieve traffic congestion. As of November 2015, Norwegian authorities have implemented urban charging schemes that operates both on the motorways and for access into downtown areas in five additional cities or municipalities: Haugesund, Kristiansand, Namsos, Stavanger, and Tønsberg.

==== Sweden ====

The Stockholm congestion tax covering Stockholm City Centre was trialed for seven-month trial during 2006 and has been operational on a permanent basis since 1 August 2007; all the entrances and exits of this area have unmanned control points operating with automatic number plate recognition and most vehicles pay a fixed fee during peak hours. A similar congestion tax was introduced in Gothenburg in 2013, the Gothenburg congestion tax. In opposite to Stockholm, this tax covers also the usage of bypass roads past the city. The congestion tax is called a tax, not a toll or fee, since a principle has been established that road tolls can only exist to pay for the construction of the specific tolled road, during a limited period. The congestion tax charges every road that crosses certain lines, regardless of its age. Three bridges in Sweden have road tolls (as of 2015).

==== United Kingdom ====
The Smeed Report recommended the implementation of congestion charging in 1964. Road pricing for London was considered by the Greater London Council in 1973 but was not progressed. The Durham City congestion charge was introduced in 2002 and the London congestion charge in 2003.

In June 2005, Transport Secretary Alistair Darling announced a proposal for a national scheme in which every vehicle would be fitted with a satellite receiver that would calculate charges, with prices (including fuel duty) ranging from 2p per mile on uncongested roads to £1.34 on the most congested roads at peak times. The scheme was dropped after an online petition against the proposals gained over 1.8 million signatures. A number of local schemes were then proposed and rejected during 2007–2008, including the Manchester congestion charge. UK wide road pricing for large goods vehicles, which was first proposed in 2000 before being dropped and then revived in 2012.

===== London =====
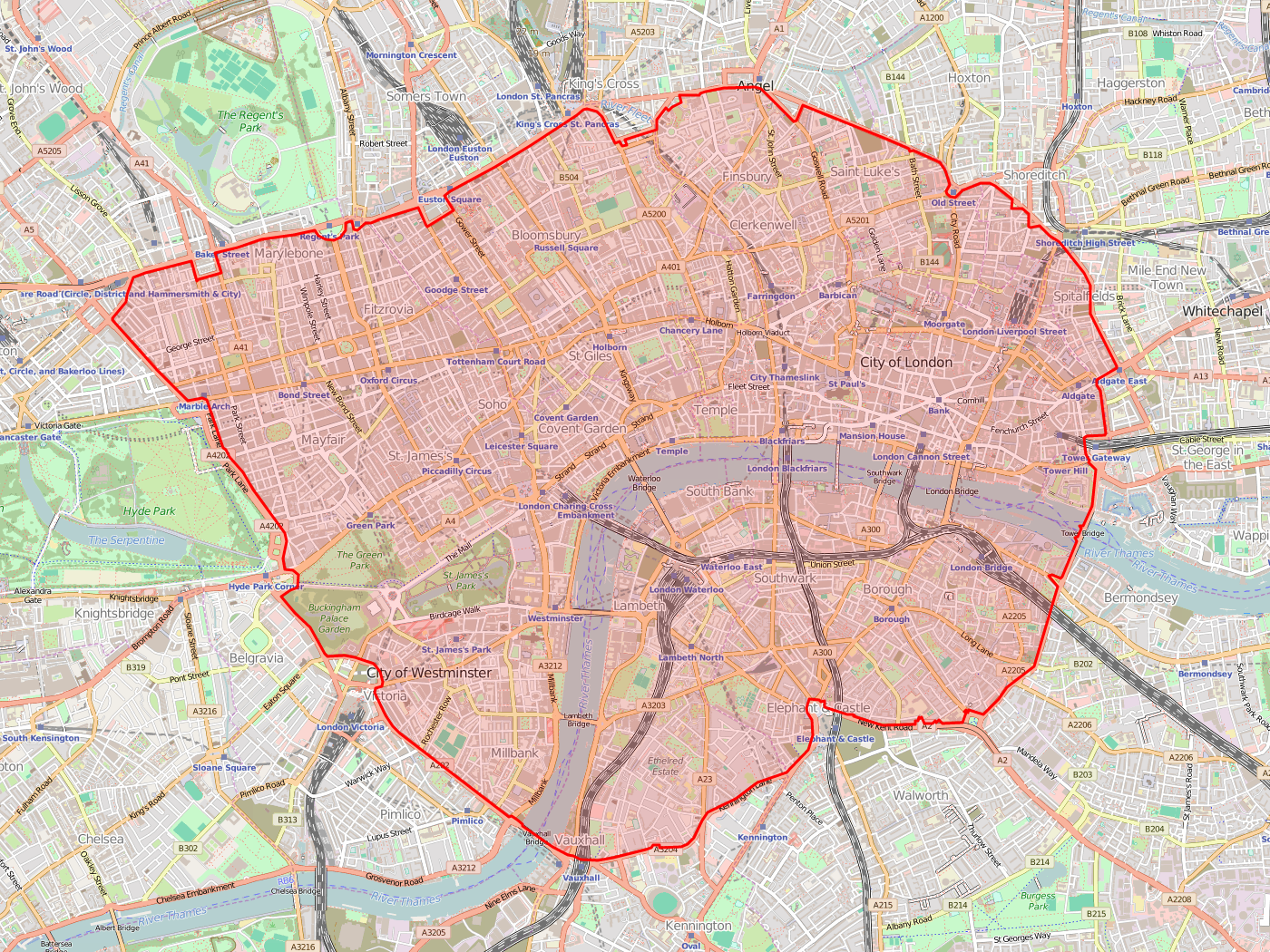
Current boundary of the London congestion charge zone (CCZ)

The London congestion charge is a flat-fee daily charge to enter the Congestion Charge Zone (CCZ) in central London, introduced in 2003. This was supplemented in 2008 by a Low Emission Zone charge, and in 2017 by a toxicity charge ('T-Charge'), now an Ultra Low Emission Zone (ULEZ) charge. A Western Extension to the Congestion Charge Zone was added in 2007 and then removed in January 2011.

A plan to incorporate an emissions-based supplement into the Congestion Charge was cancelled following the 2008 Mayoral election. Instead, the London low emission zone was introduced in stages between 2008 and 2012 with an aim of reducing the pollution emissions of diesel-powered commercial vehicles in London.

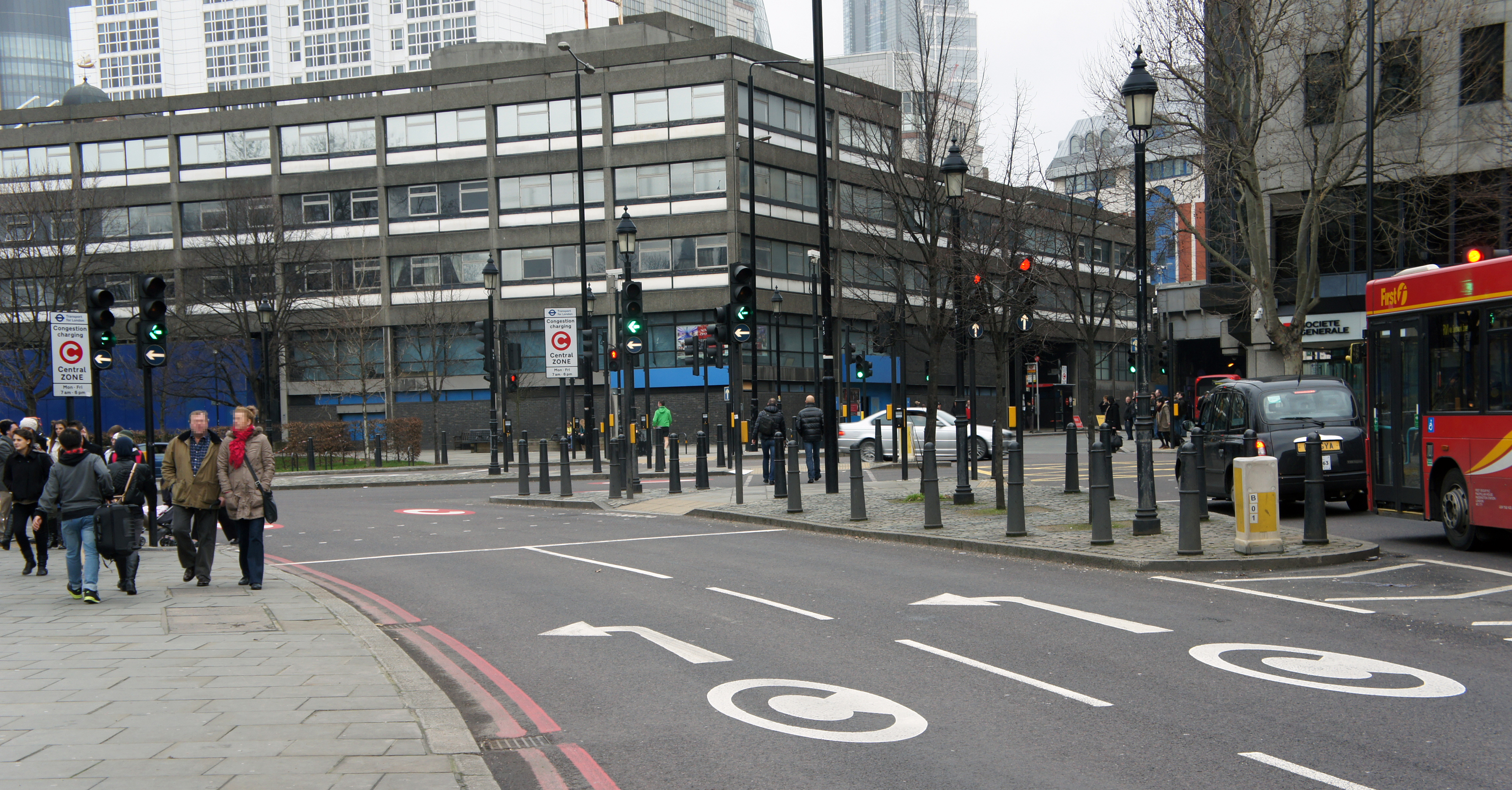
Street markings and signs with the white-on-red C alert drivers entering the congestion charge zone (CCZ) at Tower Hill.

Approved by Mayor Boris Johnson in April 2013, the Ultra Low Emission Discount (ULED) went into effect on 1 July 2013, substituting the Greener Vehicle Discount. The ULED introduced more stringent emission standards that limited the free access to the congestion charge zone to electric cars, some plug-in hybrids, and any car or van that emits 75g/km or less of CO_{2} and meets the Euro 5 emission standards for air quality. The measure was designed to curb the growing number of diesel vehicles on London's roads. The owners of vehicles registered for the Greener Vehicle Discount were granted a three-year sunset period before they have to pay the full congestion charge. The sunset period ended on 24 June 2016.

A toxicity charge, known as T-Charge, was introduced on 23 October 2017. Older and more polluting cars and vans that did not meet Euro 4 standards had to pay an extra £10 charge on top of the congestion charge to drive in central London, within the CCZ. The charge typically applied to diesel and petrol vehicles registered before 2006, and the levy was expected to affect up to 10,000 vehicles.

The T-Charge was replaced on 8 April 2019 with an ULEZ charge. Motor vehicles that do not meet the emissions criteria are charged £12.50 for most vehicle types, or £100 for heavier vehicles, to enter central London for a day. London-licensed taxis are exempted from the ULEZ; temporary exemptions and discounts apply to residents until 24 October 2021, and to disabled drivers until 26 October 2025.

London Mayor Sadiq Khan announced the introduction of the T-Charge on 17 February 2017 after London achieved record air pollution levels in January 2017, and the city was put on very high pollution alert for the first time ever, as cold and stationary weather failed to clear toxic pollutants emitted mainly by diesel vehicles. The Mayor also announced plans to expand the ULEZ beyond Central London a year earlier than planned in 2019.

=== Middle East ===
==== Dubai ====
The Salik (road toll) system in Dubai, United Arab Emirates, was introduced by the Roads and Transport Authority in 2007 and extended in 2008.

=== North America ===
==== New York ====
During the late 20th and early 21st centuries, congestion pricing in New York City was proposed several times, without success. A congestion pricing plan was proposed in 2007 by Mayor Michael Bloomberg as a component of PlaNYC, his strategic plan for the city. However, the proposal stalled in the New York State Assembly. Another proposal to implement congestion pricing was suggested by traffic commissioner Sam Schwartz in 2015, but legislation to allow this never passed. Governor Andrew Cuomo reintroduced a congestion pricing proposal for New York City in 2017 in response to the New York City Subway's state of emergency, a proposal that Mayor Bill de Blasio opposed. After years of delays, the U.S. federal government approved the plan in 2023.

Congestion pricing in New York City was implemented in 2025, making it the first American city with road pricing. Most vehicles entering Manhattan south of 60th Street are charged a fee that varies by time of day. In the fee's first year, 27 million fewer vehicles entered the toll zone compared to prior years, and the area saw lower air pollution, fewer vehicular crashes, faster traffic speeds, and higher tax revenues.

Congestion is down. The toll immediately created a financial disincentive to drive south of 60th Street, and an average of 71,500 fewer vehicles entered the area each day from January through November. That’s an 11% reduction from 2024, according to the MTA. A total of nearly 23.7 million fewer vehicles have entered the area in the first eleven months of this year, the MTA said. That helped the authority’s buses pick up the pace — a little bit— in and around the central business district, making mass transit a more appealing option when every minute counts.

Congestion Pricing Revenue Is Higher Than Anticipated

NYC's toll is set to bring in $548.3 million in 2025 after expenses

The MTA’s goal was to collect $500 million of net revenue in 2025 from the new toll — or roughly $42 million a month, on average — and the agency is poised to surpass that target with an anticipated $548.3 million generated through December, according to MTA documents. The transit agency is planning to sell its first-ever congestion-pricing bonds in 2026, secured by the new toll revenue. Over time the MTA will issue $15 billion of such debt to help modernize train signals, add elevators to subway stations and extend the Second Avenue subway to Harlem.

==== San Francisco ====
In 2006, San Francisco authorities began a feasibility study to evaluate congestion pricing in the city. The initial charging scenarios considered were presented in public meetings held in December 2008 and the final draft proposal were discussed by the San Francisco Board of Supervisors (SFBS) in December 2010, which recommended implementation of a six-month to one-year trial in 2015. Separately, in July 2010 congestion tolls were implemented at the San Francisco-Oakland Bay Bridge.

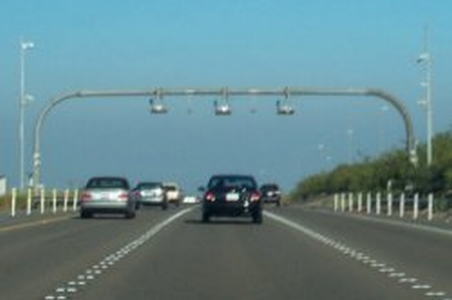
FasTrak HOT lanes at 91 Express Lanes, at Orange County, California

==== Other metropolitan areas ====
In August 2007, the United States Department of Transportation selected five metropolitan areas to initiate congestion pricing demonstration projects under the Urban Partnerships Congestion Initiative, for US$1 billion of federal funding. The five projects under this initiative are: Golden Gate Bridge in San Francisco, State Route 520 serving downtown Seattle and communities to its east, Interstate 95 between Miami and Ft. Lauderdale, Interstate 35W serving downtown Minneapolis, and a variable rate parking meter system in Chicago, which replaced New York City after it left the program in 2008.

==== High-occupancy toll (HOT) lanes ====
High-occupancy toll lanes are lanes where a variable fee based on demand is charged to non-exempt vehicles. Exempt vehicles include high-occupancy vehicles, transit vehicles, and often also low-emission vehicles. Users not wanting to pay the fee can use general-purpose lanes. HOT lanes were first implemented on California's private toll 91 Express Lanes, in Orange County in 1995, followed in 1996 by Interstate 15 in San Diego.

=== South America ===
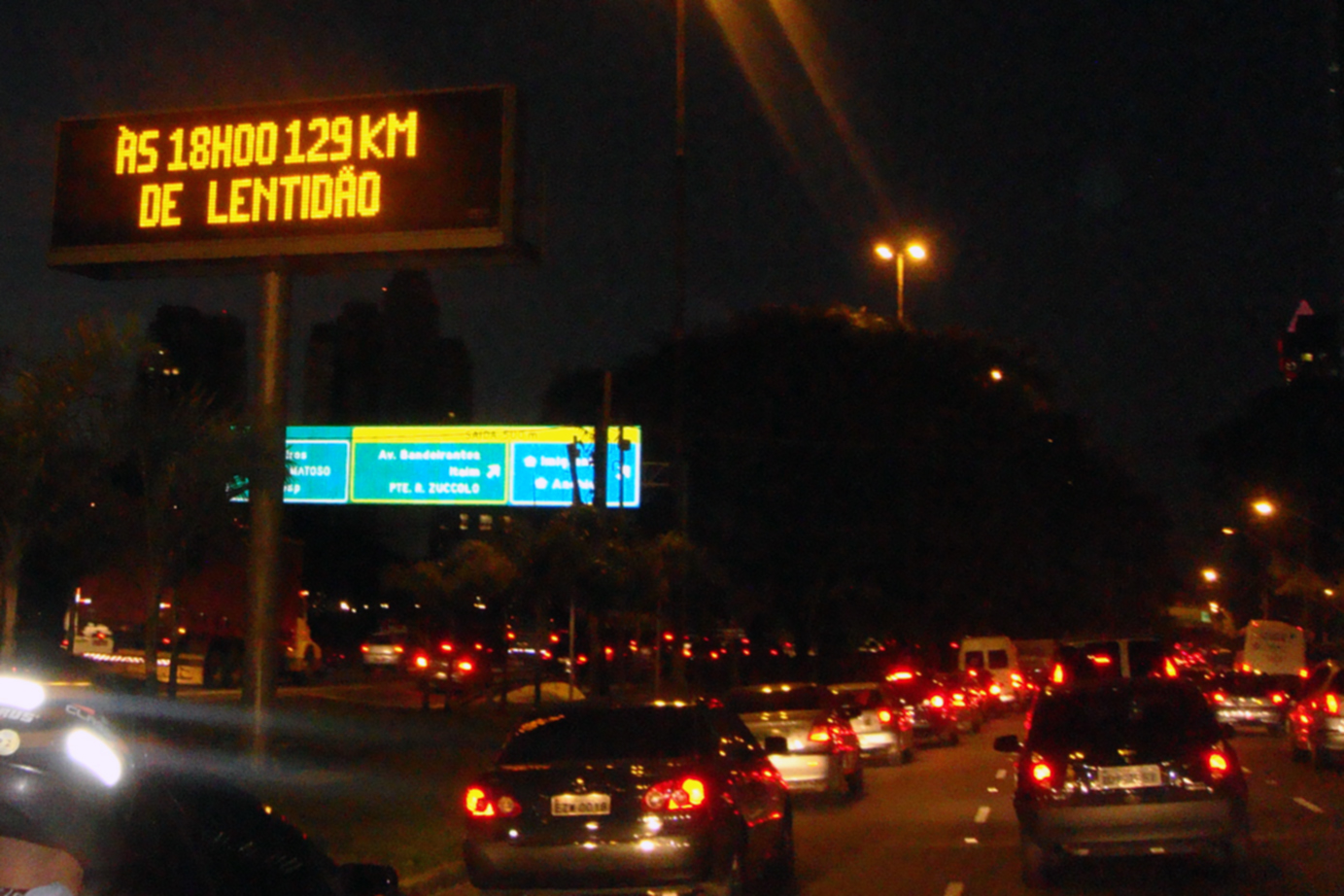
Traffic congestion on Marginal Pinheiros, near downtown São Paulo. According to Time magazine, São Paulo has the world's worst traffic jams. Drivers are informed through variable message signs the prevailing queue length.

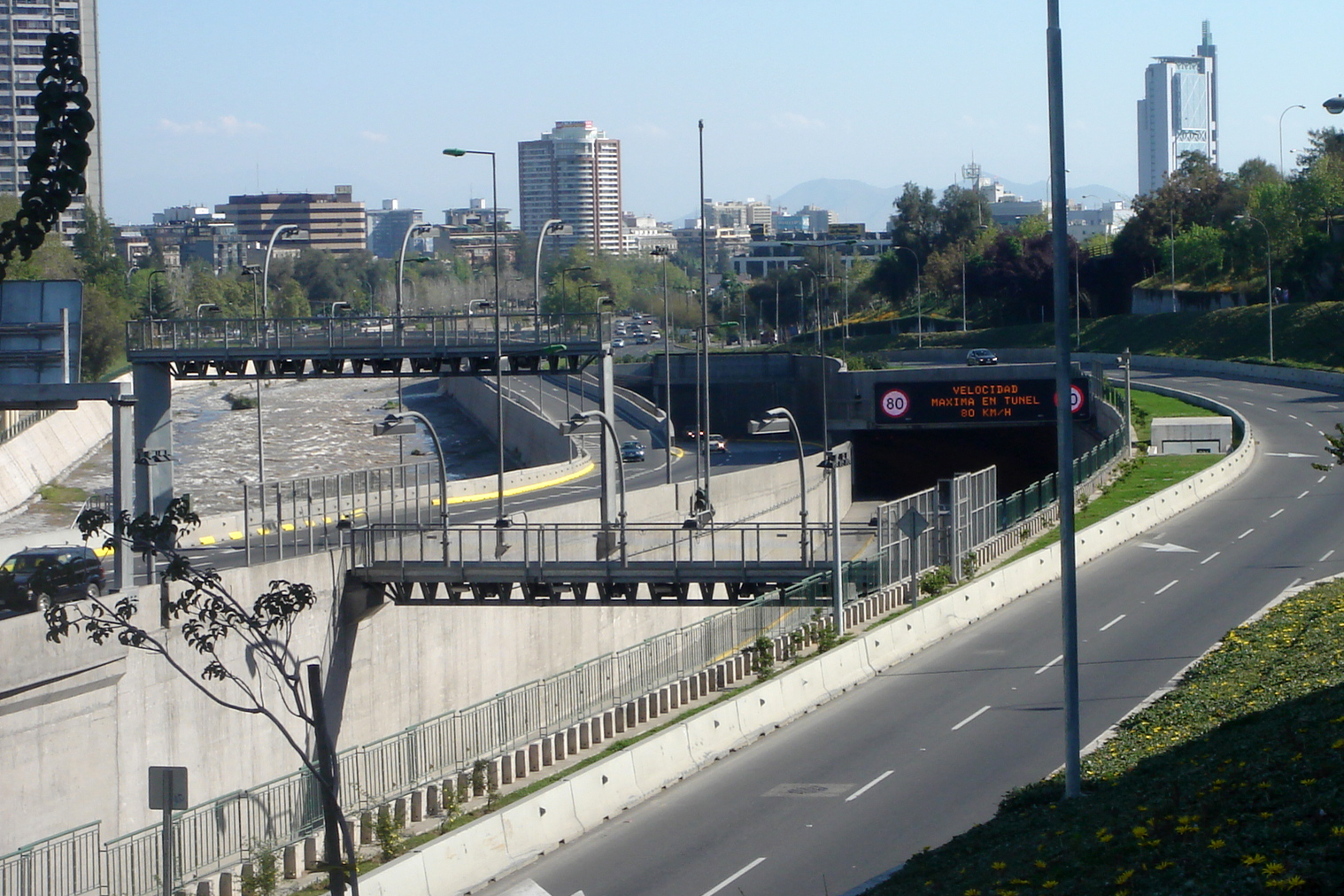
"Costanera Norte" Freeway, crossing downtown with 100% free flow, Santiago, Chile

==== Brazil ====
In January 2012, the federal government of Brazil enacted the Urban Mobility Law that authorizes municipalities to implement congestion pricing to reduce traffic flows. The law also seeks to encourage the use of public transportation and reduce air pollution. According to the law, revenues from congestion charges should be destined exclusively to urban infrastructure for public transportation and non-motorized modes of locomotion (such as walking and cycling), and to finance public subsidies for transit fares. The law went into effect in April 2013.

São Paulo city

In April 2012, one of the committees of the São Paulo city council approved a bill to introduce a R$4 (~ US$2) per day congestion charge within the same area as the existing road space rationing (Portuguese: Rodízio veicular) by the last digit of the license plate, which has been in force since 1996. The bill still needs approval by two other committees before going for a final vote at the city council. Opinion surveys have shown that the initiative is highly unpopular. A survey by Veja magazine found that 80% of drivers are against congestion pricing, and another survey by Exame magazine found that only 1% of São Paulo's residents support the initiative, while 30% find that extending the metro system is a better solution to reduce traffic congestion. São Paulo's strategic urban development plan "SP 2040", approved in November 2012, proposes the implementation of congestion pricing by 2025, when the density of metro and bus corridors is expected to reach 1.25 km/km^{2}. The Plan also requires ample consultation and even a referendum before beginning implementation.

==== Chile ====
Congestion pricing has also been implemented in urban freeways. Between 2004 and 2005, Santiago implemented the first 100% non-stop urban toll for concessioned freeways passing through a downtown area, charging by the distance traveled. Congestion pricing is used since 2007 during rush hours in order to maintain reasonable speeds within the city's core with the aim of keeping a minimum level of service for their customers.

== See also ==
- GNSS road pricing
- List of toll bridges
- List of toll roads
- Road space rationing
- Sustainable transport
- Toll roads around the world
- Vehicle miles traveled tax
- Vignette

== Bibliography ==
- Button, Kenneth J. (2010). Transport Economics 3rd Edition. Edward Elgar Publishing, Cheltenham, UK. ISBN 978-1-84064-191-2. (See Chapter 9: Optimizing Traffic Congestion)
- Santos, Georgina, ed. (2004). Road Pricing, Volume 9: Theory and Evidence (Research in Transportation Economics). JAI Press. ISBN 978-0762309689.
- Schade, Jens; Schlag, Bernhard, eds. (2003). Acceptability of Transport Pricing Strategies. Emerald Group Publishing, Bingley, West Yorkshire. ISBN 978-0080441993.
- Small, Kenneth A.; Verhoef, Erik T. (2007). The Economics of Urban Transportation. Routledge, New York. ISBN 978-0-415-28515-5. (See Chapter 4: Pricing)
- Smeed, R.J. (1964). Road pricing: the economic and technical possibilities. HMSO.
- Tsekeris, Theodore; Voß, Stefan (2009). "Design and evaluation of road pricing: State-of-the-art and methodological advances". Netnomics. 10: 5–52. doi:10.1007/s11066-008-9024-z. S2CID 153724717.
- Verhoef, Erik T.; Bliemer, Michiel; Steg, Linda; Van Wee, Bert, eds. (2008). Pricing in Road Transport: A Multi-Disciplinary Perspective. Edward Elgar Publishing, Cheltenham, UK. ISBN 978-1845428600.
- Walters, A. A. (1968). The Economics of Road User Charges. World Bank Staff Occasional Papers Number Five, Washington, D.C. ISBN 978-0-8018-0653-7.
