= Skymeter =

Defunct Canadian location technology company

Skymeter Corporation
- Type: Private
- Industry: Vehicle tracking
- Founded: October 2006; 20 years ago
- Founders: Bern Grush, Kamal Hassan, Preet Khalsa
- Defunct: November 23, 2012
- Fate: Put into receivership
- Successor: Applied Telemetrics Inc.
- Headquarters: Toronto, Ontario, Canada
- Products: Driver tracking information services
- Website: skymetercorp.com Archived February 2, 2011, at the Wayback Machine

Skymeter was a Canadian location-based services company that provided GPS data for pricing and traffic-information-applications. Skymeter was co-founded by Bern Grush, Kamal Hassan and Preet Khalsa and was headquartered at the MaRS Discovery District in Toronto, Ontario. The company went into receivership in 2012.

== Technology ==
Skymeter claimed to have developed a highly accurate and reliable GPS road-use meter using a liability-critical form of GPS technology they called "Financial-grade GPS" (FGPS) to provide highly reliable charging results that ensure fairness to the user and evidentiary assurance for the toll operator. This is in contrast to conventional GPS, which tends to fail in urban areas due to the urban canyon effect. The company marketed their technology for use in road pricing, parking, car sharing/renting/leasing, usage-based vehicle insurance, fleet management and emissions metering applications.

== Receivership of Skymeter Corp, December 2012 ==
On November 23, 2012, a “Receivership Order” was made by the Ontario Superior Court of Justice by the MaRS Investments Accelerator Fund, pursuant to Section 243(1) of the Bankruptcy and Insolvency Act. It was accepted on December 20, 2012. The assets of Skymeter Corp were taken over by a new group led by Roger d'Hollander and Bern Grush, called Applied Telemetrics Inc.

== See also ==
- GNSS Road Pricing
- Electronic toll collection
- Location-based service
