= Hydrocarbon Oil Duty =

Fuel tax imposed on road motor vehicles in UK

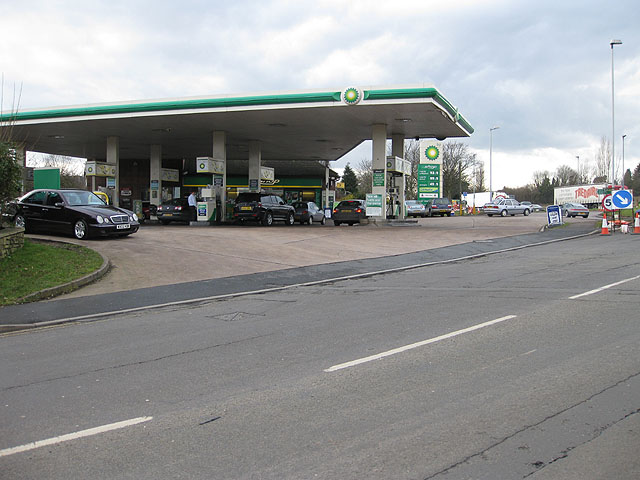
UK filling stations collected more than £27 billion in fuel duty in 2014–15.

Fuel Duty is a fuel tax levied on some fuels used by most road motor vehicles in the United Kingdom; with exceptions for local bus services, some farm and construction vehicles and aviation, which pay reduced or no fuel duty.

The government revenue from fuel duty was £27.1 billion for the financial year 2014–2015. This is an increase in cash terms in comparison to 2013-2014 but now only represents 1.5% of GDP. This is in contrast to the start of the 2000s when it was 2.3% of GDP. A further £3.9 billion is raised from the VAT on the duty, contributing some 3.5 per cent of total UK tax revenues. The Fuel Price Escalator, which was introduced in 1993 was abandoned after the disruptive fuel tax protests of 2000.

== History ==
The Finance Act 1910 (the so-called People's Budget) introduced a petrol duty in the UK for the first time. From April 1909 the rate was set at 3d (£0.013) per UK gallon, bringing the price of a typical UK gallon to 1s 1½d (equivalent to £6.76 in 2025).

It was then abolished by the Finance Act 1919 after several years of steady petrol price rises and replaced by vehicle taxation, and the tax disc based on horsepower, after which the cost of petrol was about 4s (equivalent to £8.93 in 2025) per UK gallon.

In 1928, following market reductions in the cost of a UK gallon of fuel to about 1s 2½d (equivalent to £3.28 in 2025), the Government introduced a tax of 4d (£0.017) per UK gallon bringing the cost of a UK gallon of petrol to 1s 6¾d (equivalent to £4.24 in 2025).

In the 1993 Budget during the Major ministry, Norman Lamont introduced a 10p rise and also a Fuel Price Escalator whereby the cost of fuel would be increased annually by 3 per cent above inflation in future years; the Petroleum Revenue Tax was reduced in the same budget and later abolished. Kenneth Clarke, the new chancellor, increased the escalator to 5p in November of that year. These increases were introduced at a time of considerable change in government transport policy, and followed major UK road protests, including the M11 link road protest and the protest at Twyford Down. The escalator was increased in 6p per year in 1997 by Gordon Brown, chancellor for the new Blair ministry.

The escalator was effectively cancelled by the Brown ministry follow severe disruption caused by the fuel tax protests in 2000. Since that time more cautious increases have been applied. A planned 3.02p/litre rise which was confirmed by the 2012 United Kingdom budget to come into effect on 1 August 2012 was later deferred until 1 January 2013 at short notice. The last increase in Fuel duty occurred in 2010. A decrease then occurred in 2022.

== Rates and receipts ==
The rates since 23 March 2022 have been as follows:

Fuel	Rate	Notes
Petrol, diesel, biodiesel, bioethanol	£0.5295	per litre
Natural gas used as road fuel (inc biogas)	£0.2257	per kg
Road fuel gas other than natural gas	£0.2888	per kg

VAT at the current rate is then added to the total price. The taxation percentage of forecourt prices varies according to the price of oil, rising from 55.9% at 65p per litre untaxed to 61.4% at 50p per litre (2012 figures).

== European comparisons ==
The UK average petrol price as of April 2025 is £1.37 per litre. As of May 2025, prices in the EU vary greatly from country to country. Denmark pays the most at £1.65 and Bulgaria pays the least at £1.01. Petrol prices in the UK are slightly lower than similar European countries such as France and Germany, with £1.44 and £1.47 per litre respectively.

Diesel in the UK costs, on average, £1.40 per litre as of May 2025. This is similar to the most paid across the EU, with Denmark and Ireland paying 1.43 and 1.42 per litre respectively. Diesel in France and Germany costs less on average at £1.31 and £1.32 per litre. The country that pays the least for diesel in the EU is Bulgaria at £1 per litre.

=== Aviation ===
Avtur receives a full rebate of fuel duty when used as fuel for an aircraft, excluding private aircraft. Avtur for commercial flights within the UK and all private flights is normally liable to VAT. There is no VAT charged on avtur for international flights in accordance with the Convention on International Civil Aviation, although commercial operators do pay Air Passenger Duty.

Avgas, used by some smaller planes, was taxed at half the rate of road petrol for all users until October 2008, when the reduced rate was limited to commercial flying. A minority of light planes use standard road petrol and pay tax at the normal rate.

=== Buses ===
The Bus Service Operators Grant provides a fuel duty rebate to local bus service operators (but not for express coach which receives no rebate). As of April 2010 the rebate was £0.43 for diesel, £0.2360 for road fuel gas other than natural gas and 100% for biodiesel and bioethanol. Additional rebates are available for increasing fuel efficiency, low carbon emission vehicles and equipping vehicles with Smartcards and GPS tracking equipment.

In 2001 it was proposed that long-distance scheduled coach services should receive the rebate in return for offering half-price fares to older and disabled passengers.

=== Construction and farm vehicles ===
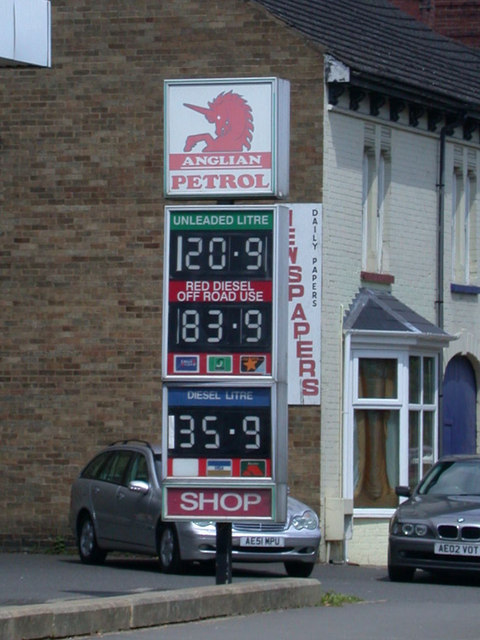
Filling station selling 'red diesel' 2008

Certain registered construction and farm vehicles are allowed to use 'red diesel' which includes a fuel dye and has a significantly reduced tax levy compared to normal road fuel. There are restrictions around the types of vehicle it can be used in and the purposes it can be used for, and there are heavy fines for misuse.

=== Trains ===
Diesel used for passenger trains is zero-rated for VAT. Trains are allowed to use red diesel and rebated biodiesel, as they are included in the category of "Any vehicle designed to be operated on a railway" and in the list of exempted machines. As a result, fuel for passenger services is just taxed at the marked gas oil (red diesel) rate.

To incentivise the use of cleaner fuels in trains, the duty was reduced from 53p to 8p for blends of red diesel and biodiesel used in approved pilot schemes in the Budget 2007.

== See also ==
- Road pricing in the United Kingdom
- Motoring taxation in the United Kingdom
- Fuel tax (for international comparisons)
