= London low emission zone =

Traffic air pollution charge scheme

Low Emission Zone
- The combined Low Emission Zone and Ultra Low Emission Zone symbol seen on road signs
- Location: Greater London
- Launched: 2008
- Technology: Fixed and mobile CCTV; Number plate recognition
- Operator: Capita (from 2015)
- Manager: Transport for London
- Currency: GBP
- Retailed: Online; Telephone; Post
- Website: Official page

The London Low Emission Zone (LEZ) is an area of London in which an emissions standard based charge is applied to non-compliant commercial vehicles. Its aim is to reduce the exhaust emissions of diesel-powered vehicles in London. This scheme should not be confused with the Ultra Low Emission Zone (ULEZ), introduced in April 2019, which applies to all vehicles. Vehicles that do not conform to various emission standards are charged; the others may enter the controlled zone free of charge. The low emission zone started operating on 4 February 2008 with phased introduction of an increasingly stricter regime until 3 January 2012. The scheme is administered by the Transport for London executive agency within the Greater London Authority.

The current standard for large commercial vehicles (over 3.5 tonnes) is Euro VI, increased from Euro IV on 1 March 2021. Vehicles need to meet these standards or face a penalty of £100 per day. The new rules were due to come into force in October 2020 but were postponed due to the 2020 coronavirus pandemic.

== History ==
Since 1993, the London Air Quality Network of Imperial College London has coordinated the monitoring of air pollution across 30 London boroughs and Heathrow, and has noted that in 2005–2006 almost all road and kerbside monitoring sites across greater London exceeded the annual average limits for nitrogen dioxide of 40 μgm$^{-3}$ (21 ppb), with eleven sites exceeding the hourly limits of 200 μgm$^{-3}$ (105 ppb) on at least 18 occasions each.

In 2000 one measuring site exceeded EU limits for air pollution, pollution rose for two years prior to 2007. The Green Party reported that nine sites in London exceeded the EU limits for air pollution in 2007. The A23 at Brixton suffered the most consistently high levels for more than two-fifths of the period. Carbon monoxide levels had reduced rapidly during the late 1990s and been relatively stable since 2002.

In 2007 Transport for London (TfL) estimated that there were 1,000 premature deaths and a further 1,000 hospital admissions annually due to poor air quality from all causes.

=== Planning ===
Towards the end of 2006, the Mayor of London, Ken Livingstone, proposed changing the congestion charge fee, from being a flat rate for all qualifying vehicles, to being based on Vehicle Excise Duty (VED) bands.

VED bands for new vehicles are based on the results of a laboratory test, designed to calculate the theoretical potential emissions of the vehicle in grammes of CO_{2} per kilometre travelled, under ideal conditions. The lowest band, Band A, is for vehicles with a calculated CO_{2} value of up to 100 g/km, the highest band, Band G, is for vehicles with a CO_{2} value of greater than 225 g/km. These results were to be used to determine which band each vehicle falls into. The resulting figures were described by the editor-in-chief of What Car? magazine as "deeply flawed".

Under the proposed modifications to the scheme, vehicles falling into Band A would have a reduced, or even zero charge, whilst those in Band G would be charged at £25 per day. Certain categories of vehicle, such as electric vehicles, are already exempt from the charge. These proposals were put out to public consultation in August 2007.

In early 2006, consultations began on another charging scheme for motor vehicles entering London. Under this new scheme, a daily charge would be applied to the vehicles responsible for most of London's road traffic emissions, commercial vehicles—such as lorries, buses, and coaches, with diesel engines. Cars were explicitly excluded. The objective of the new scheme is to help London meet its European Union (EU) air pollution obligations—specifically the EU Air Quality Framework Directive—as part of the Mayor's programme to make London the greenest city in the world. Despite some opposition, on 9 May 2007 the Mayor confirmed that he would proceed with a London Low Emission Zone, focused entirely on vehicle emissions, that plans to reduce emissions overall by 16% by 2012.

=== Introduction ===
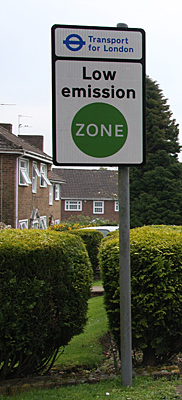
Signage at entrance to the Low Emission Zone (2008–2023)

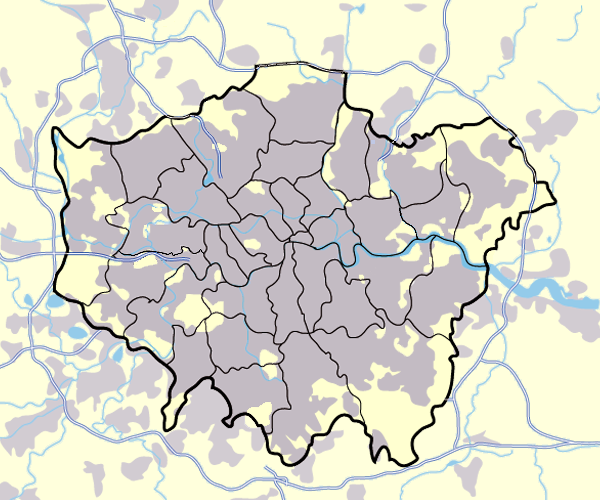
Outline of Greater London. The LEZ covers most of this area.

The LEZ came into operation on 4 February 2008 with a phased introduction of further provisions as increasingly tough emissions standards apply. Vehicles registered after October 2001 are generally compliant with the first stages of the zone when Euro 3 engine compliance was the mandatory requirement.

The regulations were tightened in July 2008 with more vehicle types included.

On 2 February 2009 the Mayor of London, Boris Johnson, announced his intention to cancel the third phase of the LEZ covering vans from 2010, subject to the outcome of a public consultation later in the year. The Freight Transport Association welcomed this move in its 3 February press release. The scheme was fully implemented on 3 January 2012.

For London Buses, since January 2012 a new Low Emission Zone (LEZ) was adopted, with those older buses selectively phasing out (those with no electronic destination displays and more than 12 years old) and the remaining buses were converted to Euro 3 or 4 standards. The new Low Emission Zone (LEZ) rules will be implemented from 2015, thus allowing all the Euro II vehicles and Euro III without catalytic standards to be removed. In July 2016 the last bus not meeting the standards was withdrawn.

=== Tougher standards from 2021 ===
From 1 March 2021, all large commercial vehicles in London need to meet Euro VI standards or face a penalty of £100 per day. Commercial vehicles which do not meet the older standards (Euro IV) are charged £300 per day.

Statistics from TfL showed that the number of vehicles complying rose to nearly 90% upon the introduction of tougher standards in March 2021, up from 70% in May 2019. All buses in London meet the Euro VI standards, with an increasing number becoming zero emission.

=== Timeline ===
Applicable vehicles over the implementation phase:

Vehicle	Feb 2008	Jul 2008	Jan 2012	Mar 2021
Lorries (over 12 tonnes)	Euro III		Euro IV	Euro VI
Lorries (3.5–12 tonnes), buses and coaches	n/a	Euro III	Euro IV	Euro VI
Minibuses and vans (1.205-tonnes)	n/a	Euro 3		
Motor caravans and ambulances (2.5–3.5 tonnes)	n/a	Euro 3		

== Operation ==
Road sign used since the 2023 expansion of the Ultra Low Emission Zone

The zone covers most of Greater London (with minor deviations to allow diversionary routes and facilities to turn around without entering the zone and the M25 motorway). The boundary of the zone, which operates 24 hours a day, 7 days a week, is marked by signs. The LEZ emissions standards are based on European emission standards relating to particulate matter (PM), which are emitted by vehicles, which have an effect on health. The following vehicles are not charged:

- Lorries, buses, and coaches that meet the Euro 6 emission standard.
- Vans and minibuses not exceeding 3.5 tonnes
- All cars and motorcycles

Non-GB registered vehicles that meet the required LEZ standards will need to register with TfL; most compliant GB registered vehicles do not. Owners of vehicles that do not meet the above requirements have a number of options:

- Fit a filter
- Replace the vehicle
- Reorganise their fleet to only use compliant vehicles in London
- Convert to natural gas
- Pay the charge (from £100 to £200 for each calendar day that the vehicle travels within the zone)

The zone is monitored using automatic number plate reading cameras (ANPR) to record number plates. Vehicles entering or moving around the zone are checked against the records of the DVLA to enable TfL to pursue owners of vehicles for which the charge has not been paid. For vehicles registered outside of Great Britain, an international debt recovery agency is used to obtain unpaid charges and fines. The scheme is operated on a day-to-day basis by IBM.

== Reaction ==
The scheme was opposed during the consultation phase by a range of interested parties: The Freight Transport Association proposed an alternative scheme, reliant on a replacement cycle of vehicles, with lorries over eight years old being liable, with higher years for other vehicles. They also stated that the standards were different from the forthcoming Euro V requirements as well suggesting the scheme did not do anything to help reduce CO_{2} emissions. The Road Haulage Association opposed the scheme, stating the costs to hauliers and benefits to the environment did not justify its introduction. Schools and St John Ambulance have expressed concern about the additional costs that the scheme will bring them, particularly in light of the restricted budgets they operate under. London First, a business organisation, criticised aspects of the scheme with relation to the categorisation of vehicles, but supported the principle. The scheme has been supported by the British Lung Foundation and the British Heart Foundation.

== Related schemes ==
=== T-Charge ===
In October 2017, London Mayor Sadiq Khan introduced a new £10 toxicity charge, known as the T-Charge, after London suffered record air pollution levels in January 2017, and the city was put on very high pollution alert for the first time ever, as cold and stationary weather failed to clear toxic pollutants emitted mainly by diesel vehicles. The T-Charge was levied on vehicles within Central London on top of the £11.50 congestion charge. The T-Charge was replaced by the ULEZ in April 2019.

=== Ultra Low Emission Zone ===
The ULEZ, which went into effect on 8 April 2019, initially covered the same area as the T-Charge but applies 24/7, 365 days a year, with charges of £12.50 a day for cars, vans and motorcycles, and £100 a day for lorries, buses and coaches. One month after its introduction, the number of the worst polluting vehicles entering the zone each day had dropped from 35,578 to 26,195. The zone was extended to the North Circular and South Circular roads on 25 October 2021. It was expanded again on 29 August 2023 to coincide with the low emission zone, covering almost all of Greater London.

== See also ==
- Ecopass (Milan)
- Great Smog
- London congestion charge
- Low-emission zone
- Motoring taxation in the United Kingdom
- Road pricing in the United Kingdom
