= Vehicle miles traveled tax =

Mileage-based tax

A vehicle miles traveled tax, also frequently referred to as a VMT tax, VMT fee, mileage-based fee, or road user charge, is a policy of charging motorists based on how many miles they have traveled.

It has been proposed in various states in the United States including Illinois who are currently following through with implementing this tax, and elsewhere as an infrastructure funding mechanism to replace, or supplement the fuel tax, which has been generating billions less in revenue each year due to increasingly fuel efficient vehicles.

In the United States, a VMT fee currently exists as part of a limited program for 5,000 volunteers in Oregon and for trucks in Illinois. Internationally, Germany, Austria, Slovakia, the Czech Republic, Poland, Hungary, Belgium, Russia and Switzerland have implemented various forms of VMT fees, limited to trucks. New Zealand also has such a system applying to all heavy vehicles and diesel-powered cars, known locally as a Road User Charge. Bulgaria has a truck based system under development. With the UK government banning the sale of non-electric cars from 2030, VMT tax is being considered in place of fuel duty revenue.

== Overview ==
Instead of using a tax on fuel consumption as a way of financing transportation infrastructure, a VMT fee charges motorists based on their road usage measured in mileage. These charges can be either a flat fee (e.g., a fixed number of cents per mile, regardless of where or when the travel occurs) or a variable fee based on considerations such as time of travel, congestion levels on a facility, type of road, type and weight of the vehicle, vehicle emission levels, and ability to pay of the owner. Or it can be a combination of flat and variable fees.

There are different ways a VMT fee can be implemented. In a broad sense, the application of VMT fees is envisioned through the use of an onboard vehicle device to capture the distance driven by a vehicle through GPS or other technology and relate that to a method of charging, which could involve payments at the gas pump, billing, or automatic deductions for a prepaid customer account. GPS units on board a vehicle can record distance, assign it to the appropriate taxing jurisdiction, and calculate the amount owed. Only the final billing information would have to be released outside the unit, to protect privacy.

Since 2000, fuel tax revenues have declined significantly as a result of less driving and increasing fuel efficiency. As fuel tax revenues dwindle, policymakers have had to divert billions from the general fund and other non-transportation funds to pay for infrastructure. This is increasing pressure on transportation policy makers to search for new, viable road financing mechanisms.

== Timeline ==
In 2007, Oregon conducted a VMT tax pilot project and found that the concept was "feasible".

In 2008, the University of Iowa Public Policy Center began a national evaluation of VMT fees. This multi-year study involves placing an on-board computer into participants' vehicles. Data are collected from both the technology and the participants. Participants were selected from six locations nationwide and range in age, education, and background. The on-board computer keeps track of the number miles participants travel and submits the information to the University of Iowa Public Policy Center to be processed and evaluated. The study seeks to test the appropriateness of the technology and user accessibility and acceptability.

On February 20, 2009, U.S. Secretary of Transportation Ray LaHood stated that VMT was an idea "that should be looked at." However, in response to LaHood's remarks, White House Press Secretary Robert Gibbs said that VMT "will not be Obama administration policy."

On February 26, 2009, the National Surface Transportation Infrastructure Financing Commission released its final report, recommending VMT as a means of financing road infrastructure that would eventually replace the fuel tax.

In June 2009, ITS Institute (RITA), Minnesota Department of Transportation published a research report, "Technology Enabling Near-Term Nationwide Implementation of Distance Based Road User Fees."

In 2010, former U.S. Secretaries of Transportation Norman Mineta and Samuel K. Skinner called for the adoption of a VMT tax to stabilize transportation funding.

In March 2011, the U.S. Congressional Budget Office issued a report comparing the relative merits of fuel taxes, vehicle excise taxes, vehicle tire excise taxes, and a hypothetical vehicle miles traveled tax. It emphasized the disproportionate road wear of cargo trucks versus the current tax rate paid, but noted that costs assessed to this sector would be passed along to the consumer. Also noteworthy was a chart indicating that the excise tax on tires could provide motivation to vehicle owners to reduce many external costs of vehicle travel and road maintenance, but it is currently set far too low to have much effect. The report noted that a GPS-based tax would have a unique trait in allowing taxes to be increased in high congestion zones where tolls are not practical, with the caveat that advances in toll collection technology would mitigate this advantage. The report also emphasized that both tire taxes and vehicle mile traveled taxes would have to be rated based on weight-per-axle to properly distribute wear-related costs of highway use.

In late 2012, Oregon conducted a second road user fee pilot. The pilot was completed successfully in January 2013.

In 2013, Oregon passed the first legislation in the United States to establish a permanent road usage charge system for transportation funding. The law authorizes the Oregon Department of Transportation (ODOT) to set up a mileage collection system for 5,000 volunteer motorists beginning July 1, 2015. ODOT may assess a charge of 1.5 cents per mile for up to 5,000 volunteer cars and light commercial vehicles and issue a gas tax refund to those participants.

In January 2015, Azuga Inc., Sanef, IMS and Verizon were selected as Commercial Account Managers for the OReGO program. OReGO is name of the voluntary road usage charging program in Oregon. Azuga Inc., One of the commercial managers selected provides the account management services to the state of Oregon. Included in these services is the collection of the road usage charge (RUC) from the driver and then passing that fee onto the Oregon Department of Transportation. In addition to the RUC functionality, Azuga provides additional value added services to drivers such as geofencing, trip logging, engine health and driver scoring.

In January 2016, the California Department of Transportation (Caltrans) has selected four account managers, Azuga Inc., Intelligent Mechatronic Systems (IMS), Arvato and EROAD, for a road charging pilot in California that is to launch July 1, 2016. The California road charge pilot will be looking for 5,000 volunteers – similar to Oregon, but will differ from the Oregon pilot in that, it will only simulate payments.

== Political acceptance ==
Exploration of this policy idea has received support from individual libertarians (Randy O'Toole, Cato Institute), Republicans (e.g., Senator Chuck Grassley), Democrats (e.g., former U.S. Senate Budget Committee Chairman Kent Conrad of North Dakota), and progressives (e.g., former Massachusetts Secretary of Transportation Jim Aloisi) alike.

In 2009, the conservative Civitas Institute in North Carolina found that only 21% of voters favored the idea. A two-year trial program of VMT charging completed in 2011 found that just 41% of participants favored the idea beforehand, but after the trial 70% favored it.

Many experts believed in 2009 that it would take a decade before VMT was implemented and Oregon introduced a limited program for 5,000 volunteers in 2015.

Some drivers in rural areas worry that VMT taxes would have them paying more because they drive farther between destinations than do urban drivers. They argue that while they do drive greater distances on the roads, they drive at faster speeds that are more fuel-efficient. Others, however, are supporting VMT fees because they allow lower rates to be charged in a rural settings, which the gas tax does not. A possible unintended consequence of a VMT is that it would monetarily punish drivers of energy efficient cars by leveling similar charges for all drivers, negating reasons to own energy efficient vehicles. A VMT may actually increase purchases of less efficient vehicles, leading to increased consumption of fuels, and release of more CO_{2}. This could be negated by rating the tax based on weight-per-axle, as heavier and less efficient cars tend to weigh more. It is also unrealistic to assume repeal of gasoline taxes in conjunction with VMT implementation. In federal systems, gasoline excise may be levied by multiple jurisdictions, reducing overall net revenue from the need to maintain both VMT and gasoline excise revenue services.

=== Privacy ===
Some motorists are concerned that VMT charging could be an invasion of their privacy, as location information is utilized. They view the program as "Big Brother" or a "Nanny" state. As any data collection system poses a risk to private information of users, VMT pilot programs across the country have explored various options to protect the privacy of participants.

Oregon's 2012 VMT fee pilot study offered five plans, each with a different technology option and payment method depending on the drivers' privacy preferences. Drivers had the choice to report miles using a smartphone, a global positioning system (GPS) device, or a simple reporting device with no GPS technology; or, they could opt out of using technology altogether by paying a flat rate in lieu of a per-mile fee. But even those drivers who chose to report their miles using a smartphone or a GPS were not releasing their exact location coordinates and times of travel. These on-board units were programmed to contain just enough intelligence and knowledge of map boundaries to accumulate and transfer to the billing entity the miles per region or zone, as opposed to exact location. Likewise, the on-board units were only programmed to aggregate travel during particular periods, as opposed to during exact times. Negotiations with the American Civil Liberties Union shaped the privacy provisions of Oregon's recent 2013 legislation, which set up the forthcoming 2015 VMT program. Section 9 of the bill limits who has access to the data and requires those who have access—including private sector vendors—to protect it. Furthermore, the data is destroyed 30 days after it is required for payment processing or dispute resolution.

To protect privacy in its VMT study, the University of Iowa pilot study used an on-board "smart card" data recording system that separated the driver's personal information from the vehicle miles recorded. To accomplish this, researchers developed a two-stage data entry system whereby participants upload basic miles traveled, but then must separately log into a different system to upload more extensive personal data. The miles driven are thus unlinked from other personal data to insure anonymity.

The Puget Sound Regional Council encountered similar privacy concerns as a result of its 2002 road tolling demand response study, which monitored participants' mileage on certain types of roadways in a similar manner as the above VMT pilot programs. Under the study, an on-board meter used a GPS receiver to match the vehicle's location to a map of the toll-road network embedded in the meter. The meter stored location and toll information, and periodically communicated it to a central computer using cellular wireless communications.

In a 2008 report written after the study, the Regional Council suggested that future tolling programs (and by extension, VMT programs) could better protect participants' privacy through a choice of two different mileage recording approaches. Participants could either enroll in the "thin client" or "thick client" operating approaches. The thin client would use an on-board toll meter where all raw data was transferred to the tolling office. In the office, the data would be processed and the road segments would be recognized and matched with toll rates. In the thick client approach, the tolling process would take place in the on-board unit. After the road section was recognized, the toll rate would be processed in the on-board unit according to the type of the road, time period, and vehicle class. The road information could then be sent to the tolling office in aggregate form. Under this approach, specific road details would never be stored in the toll system office. If the fee was calculated in the on-board unit, it would also be possible to integrate a card slot into the on-board unit for usage of stored value card to pay the fee. Because the prepaid card would have no identifying information (as opposed to a credit card), this method would achieve maximum privacy for the participants.

Another option is to track and collect the fee not through a government-issued device, but through a multi-purpose, private-sector application or tool that records the mileage and then transmits it to a private entity for billing.

== Effects ==
A 2017 study in the Journal of Public Economics found that "a VMT tax designed to increase highway spending $55 billion per year increases annual welfare by $10.5 billion or nearly 20% more than a gasoline tax does because: (1) the differentiated VMT tax is better than the gasoline tax at targeting its tax to and affecting the behavior of those drivers who create the greatest externalities, and (2) the greater fuel economy that results from a higher CAFE standard effectively reduces a gasoline tax and its benefits, but has less effect on a VMT tax and its benefits. Our empirical findings therefore indicate that implementing a VMT tax is a more efficient policy than raising the gasoline tax to improve the financial and economic condition of the highway system. Importantly, we also identify considerations that suggest that a VMT tax is likely to be more politically attractive to policymakers than is raising the gasoline tax."

== See also ==
- Congestion pricing
- GNSS road pricing
- Usage-based insurance
- Road pricing
- Vehicle miles of travel
