= GNSS road pricing =

Form of road toll using navigation satellites

GNSS road pricing or GNSS-based tolling is the charging of road users using Global Navigation Satellite System (GNSS) sensors inside vehicles. Road pricing using GNSS simplifies distance-based tolling for all types of roads in a tolled road network since it does not require the installation and operation of roadside infrastructure, such as tollbooths or microwave-based toll gantries. Instead, all vehicles required to pay the distance-based fees are equipped with an On Board Unit (OBU).

GNSS-based electronic tolling is used to charge trucks above 3.5 tons for road usage on the entire national road network in European countries such as Germany, Slovakia, Hungary, Belgium, Russia, the Czech Republic, and in Bulgaria. Like the Czech Republic, Poland plans to replace its microwave-based tolling system with a GNSS-based solution in 2021. Satellite-based technology can generate greater toll revenue and eliminate the problem of congestion caused by traffic diversion when vehicles subject to tolls are no longer motivated to drive on alternative routes in order to avoid the distance-based fees, since all roads can be easily tolled without the need for installing otherwise costly roadside infrastructure.

Once installed, the GNSS-based road pricing system can also be used for other applications such as in parking and insurance. After the introduction of the first GNSS-based tolling systems in Europe, some critics argued that this approach could lead to an invasion of people’s privacy. However, the European Union's General Data Protection Regulation (EU) 2016/679 (GDPR) applies since 25 May 2018.

India's Global Navigation Satellite System (GNSS) is called the Indian Regional Navigation Satellite System (IRNSS) or Navigation Indian Constellation (NavIC). It is a satellite network that provides location information to the Indian region and the surrounding areas.

== History ==
Even though GNSS and electronic toll collection have been used for decades, the idea of using satellites for road tolling is relatively recent. The first successful demonstration of GNSS Road Pricing systems was given in 1994 during the ETC field trials on the A555 motorway between Bonn and Cologne (Germany) using the American NavStar GPS System, which was commissioned that year (there were no other GNSS systems that had been commissioned in 1994). In 1998, the European Union published a report which proposed the use of GNSS to charge vehicles by distance. Germany introduced the first the GNSS road pricing system for truck tolling in 2005 (LKW-Maut). In 2007, the Netherlands legislated the implementation of GNSS road pricing by 2011, and nationwide by 2016. However, the project was declared controversial and subsequently put on indefinite hold due to the Dutch government collapse on February 20, 2010. Official rejection of the proposed national road pricing in the Netherlands has been sealed after the largest party in Dutch government, i.e., the CDA, in March 2010. The European Union issued the EFC-directive, in order to standardize European toll collection systems. Systems deployed after January 1, 2007 must support at least one of the following technologies: satellite positioning, mobile communications using the GSM-GPRS standard or 5.8 GHz microwave technology. The Directive also suggested that the "application of the new satellite positioning (GNSS) and mobile communications (GSM/GPRS) technologies to electronic toll systems may serve to meet the requirements of the new road-charging policies planned at Community and Member State level." Furthermore, the European Commission issued the Regulation on the European Electronic Toll Service (EETS) which must be implemented by all Member States from 19 October 2021. Since six of the Member States have deployed GNSS-based tolling as of 2021, virtually all EETS-enabled OBUs include GNSS technology.

== How it works ==
Although the architecture of individual systems may vary, all GNSS road pricing systems share key common elements in how they work. In a typical road pricing system, in-vehicle sensors (OBUs) record time and position data. The vehicle data is processed into trip data, which is then matched to a set pricing scheme to produce a bill. Most GNSS-based toll systems process trip data at a back office (using a "thin client" approach), while some systems have been designed so that all the map matching and fee calculations take place within the OBU itself ("thick client" or "fat client), and some systems combine both approaches.

== Applications ==
=== Congestion pricing ===
Some cities that have already implemented congestion pricing are looking at ways to expand and improve their systems. Using GNSS road pricing, vehicles can be charged for the distance they travel within a cordoned area as opposed to paying a flat entry fee. In Singapore, the Electronic Road Pricing (ERP) system will be switching to a GNSS-based system after the installation of the Onboard Units (OBUs) is completed in 2025. Singapore's Land Transport Authority announced that the distance-based charging policy will not be implemented soon, with no concrete date on when the new policy will take place.

=== Time distance place (TDP) road pricing ===
GNSS road pricing enables road pricing policies based on time, distance and place (TDP). TDP road pricing is very much based on the road pricing principles outlined by William Vickrey. In such a system, vehicles are charged based on when, where, and how much they drive. Some transportation experts see TDP road pricing as a fairer, more effective means of charging road users and managing travel demand.

== GNSS road pricing providers ==
- EROAD
- Continental
- Satellic
- Siemens
- SkyToll
- Intelligent Mechatronic Systems
- EFKON
- GMV
- Thales
- Kapsch TrafficCom
- Teletrac plc
- Skymeter

== See also ==
- Global Navigation Satellite System
- Global Positioning System
- Road Pricing
- Congestion pricing
- Telematics
- Electronic toll collection
- Vehicle miles traveled tax (VMT tax)
