= Salter Report =

1932–3 British investigation into transport policy

The Salter Report was named after Arthur Salter, who chaired an influential conference of road and rail experts in 1932 which reported in 1933. The report directed British government policy for transport funding for decades to follow.

== Recommendations ==
=== Railways ===
The committee investigated the perception, current in the 1930s, that the safety, pricing and operating regulations that applied to the railways had left them at an unfair disadvantage when compared to the road haulage industry, which was unregulated. It noted that the railway system, then organised into several regional companies, probably had no need for many of the small branch lines and services, as motor transport had shown itself to be more efficient for local deliveries. But it concluded that the existing system of road funding, which relied on local authorities to fund a significant portion of the road network, represented a subsidy to the road hauliers.

The lorry had started to compete against rail freight on long journeys, which was seen to be undesirable as it represented unfair commercial competition and added to road congestion. Although railway companies were experiencing financial difficulties as a result of the loss of their monopoly of service, the committee looked at ways for the railway operators to co-operate with each other and the road haulage industry through integration, but still maintain commercial competition. The report stopped short of recommending direct subsidies or the nationalisation of the railways, viewing this as unacceptably protectionist and socialist.

=== Road transport ===
The widespread use of public road passenger vehicles and private motor cars was seen to be of great benefit, but it noted that the growing numbers of motor vehicles were capable of making many more journeys than the previous generation of horse-drawn traffic. In particular, the hauling of heavy loads by road was useful but expensive as it caused more wear on the carriageways. To counteract this, the report recommended that local authorities should be able to restrict heavy traffic from local roads, and should be relieved of the burden of funding their maintenance. Instead, the motor vehicle should fully pay its way. The report recommended replacing the established system of road funding from the local rate payer wholly onto the operators of motor vehicles through changes in road pricing.

== Government action ==
The government adopted the committee's recommendations in 1933 when the Minister for Transport, Oliver Stanley, introduced new speed limits with the Road Traffic Act 1934 and a licensing system for commercial heavy goods vehicles and their operators. This was soon followed by Chancellor Neville Chamberlain who significantly increased the fees due for road tax and fuel.

These changes were applauded by the railway industry, whose price restrictions were partly lifted. They saw the road tax changes as a way to help them redress a common problem that was affecting railway companies across the world at that time.

The costs and conditions attached to the new licences and vehicle duty were contentious to road users as they were based on axle weight and could be very expensive; many municipal corporations who ran their own fleets, bus companies, vehicle manufacturers, hauliers, showmen, trade unions and the coal industry protested and predicted crippling increases in fees. The former Transport Minister, Herbert Morrison claimed that using: "the weapon of taxation of road transport as a means of putting the railways right was a foolish and idiotic policy". The new charges were blamed for driving heavier steam traction off the road in favour of the lighter lorries powered by internal combustion engines using imported oil. This was at a time of high unemployment in the British coal industry, when the steam haulage business required 950,000 tons of coal annually. It also introduced an unpopular requirement for hauliers to produce paperwork to show that their drivers were operating safely and not being overworked. Previous attempts to impose safety rules on hauliers had been nearly impossible to enforce. The threat of withdrawing a licence was viewed as the best way of ensuring the new regulations were respected by the industry.

It was planned that the new charges on vehicles and petrol duties would contribute the £60 million needed annually for the Road Fund, and more besides in order to pay more of the social costs associated with motor traffic. Critics claimed that this would increase the cost of transport during the Great Depression and keen foreign competition. Supporters countered this by noting that it was merely redistributing the burden from the ratepayer onto the haulier. The Treasury would make motor vehicles solely responsible for road costs, and levy these charges on motorised traffic, rather than through local government or penalising the railways. In doing so, it recognised that road vehicles had been "using the common highway for private profit, while endangering public safety, amenity, and capital".

== Legacy ==
The UK railway infrastructure held its ground as a freight and passenger system for many decades; this could be compared with countries such as the USA where road transport was allowed to gain a critical mass. The railways were eventually unified and nationalised as British Rail in 1948, while the predicted closure of branch lines was finally implemented under the 'Beeching Axe'.

The road duties introduced in 1933-4 remain as a key part of vehicle duties today. The centralised funding of roads supported a more planned approach towards a new network of bypasses and high-speed routes through the Trunk Roads Act of 1936.
