= Bus Service Operators' Grant =

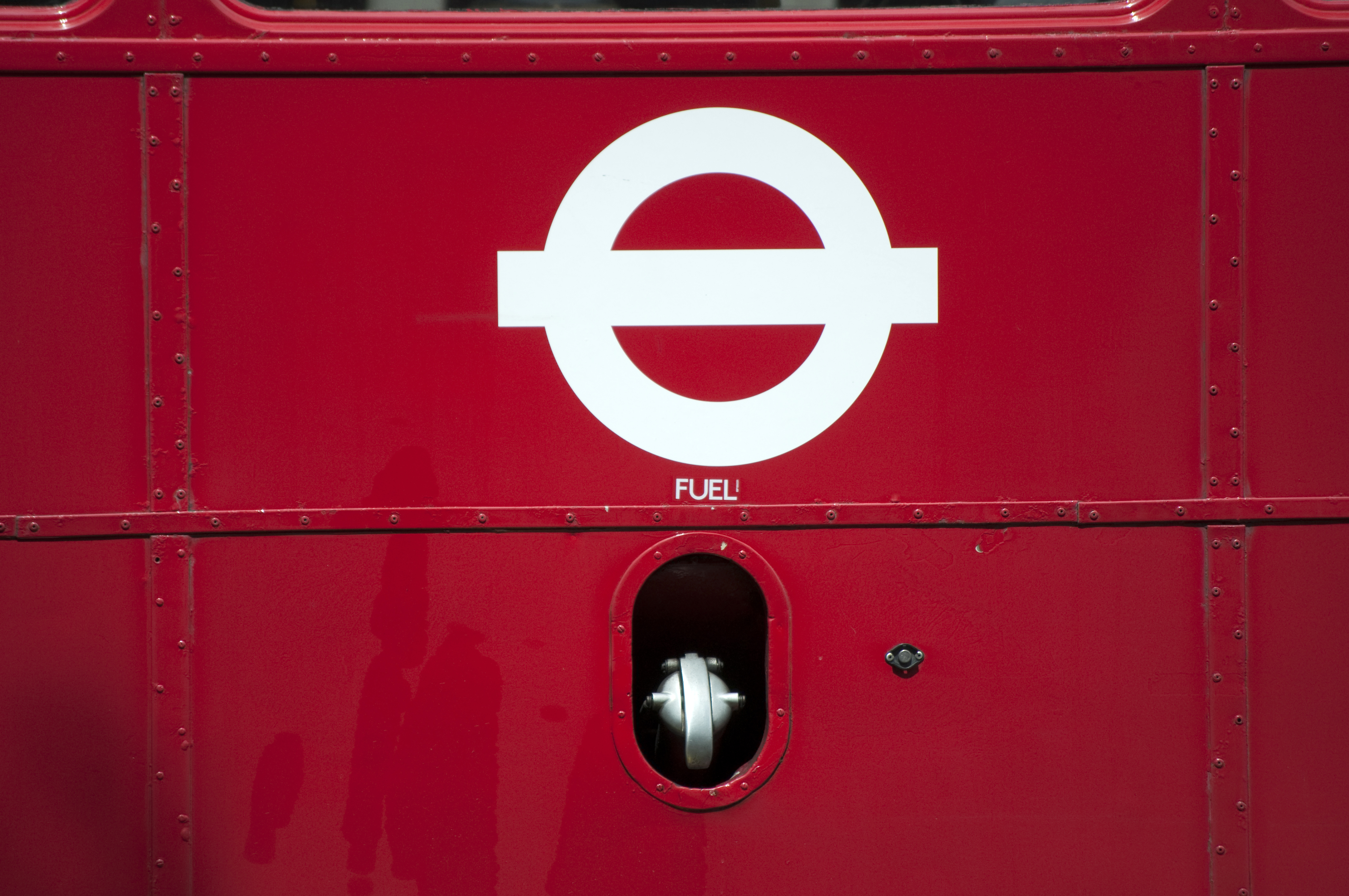
Bus Service Operators' Grant is a service-focussed subsidy (as opposed to a passenger-focussed subsidy) to the bus industry in the United Kingdom. This evolved from the Fuel Duty Rebate which refunds some of the fuel duty paid by bus operators in the UK, including those in London, to support bus services.

The Bus Service Operators Grant (BSOG, and formerly Fuel Duty Rebate) is a scheme that refunds some of the Fuel Duty incurred by operators of registered local bus services in the United Kingdom. In 2006 the grant repaid 81% of duty paid on ultra low sulphur diesel fuel, and 100% for bioethanol, biodiesel and liquefied petroleum gas.

== Overview ==
The Fuel duty rebate was established under section 92 of the Finance Act 1965. Further legislation was included in section 19 of the Transport Act 1985. Fuel Duty Rebate (FDR) was available only on complying local bus services. Until 1994 the level of FDR was 100% By 1999 the rebate had been reduced to about 67%.

The grant is available for operators of local bus services available for use by the general public which operated on public roads. The definition of 'local' is that stops should not be more than 15 miles apart.

The grant is paid to local-authority supported services, and to unsupported commercially-sustained services that comply with the eligibility criteria. The bus industry also receives reimbursement for carriage of holders of valid bus passes, which is also funded by the local authority.

The grant is also available to operators of vehicles with Small Bus Permits (Section 19) when providing services for some groups of passengers:-

- People aged 60 or over.
- Persons of all ages, who are physically or mentally impaired and persons assisting them
- People on income support
- People on job seekers allowance
- People of all ages, suffering a degree of social exclusion by virtue of unemployment, poverty or other economic factors, homelessness, geographical remoteness, ill health, or religious or cultural reasons.
- People of all ages, who believe that it would be unsafe for them to use any public passenger transport services.
- Carers or children under 16 years of age accompanying any of the above

Some longer UK coach services, such as the Oxford Tube claim the grant for part of their routes. The Oxford Tube initially made a stop at Lewknor on the M40 motorway in order to qualify for the grant between Oxford and that point. Subsequently, it has created additional demand from passengers joining at Lewknor.

== England ==
The terms were changed by Section 154 of the Transport Act 2000. Fuel duty rebate was renamed the Bus Service Operators' Grant (BSOG), even though it is still as a rebate paid at a set rate per litre of fuel. In 2002 the 'Bus Service Operators Grant (England) Regulations 2002' extended the grant to cover a wider range of community transport service operators.

Under the Coalition government's Comprehensive Spending Review (CSR) the grant was kept at 81% until April 2012, when reduced by 20%. The current payment rate is the lowest ever percentage since the rebate's inception in the 1960s.

In autumn 2012 the DfT held a consultation on bus subsidy reform in which it presented options to switch some or all of the rebate away from the bus operators that incur the fuel cost, and pay it instead to local authorities. It opened on 13 September 2012 and closed on 12 November.

The Government considered reducing BSOG in 2013 but following a joint campaign by bus operators, local authorities and campaign groups, decided against. However, some eligibility criteria were tightened.

A 2014 economic appraisal carried out by the firm KPMG on behalf of the group Greener Journeys found that for £1 spent on BSOG, between £2.50 and £3.50 is generated in benefits, including wider economic and social impacts.

In 2015, again there were fears that BSOG would be cut as part of the Government Spending Review, which combined with cuts to local authority funding, would have threatened many bus routes. Campaign and industry groups campaigned against this, and in the Autumn Statement in November, it became clear that BSOG would be retained.

BSOG rates paid to operators in England from 2014 onwards.

Fuel	Duty	Grant
Diesel (ppl)	52.95	34.57
Biodiesel (ppl)	52.95	34.57
Bioethanol (ppl)	52.95	34.57
Biofuels: used cooking oil (ppl)	52.95	34.57
Unleaded Petrol (ppl)	52.95	32.66
Natural gas used as road fuel (inc biogas) (ppkg)	26.15	18.88
Road fuel gas other than natural gas (e.g. LPG) (ppkg)	33.04	18.88
Zero Emission Buses (e.g. Hydrogen Fuel Cell Bus/Battery Electric Bus) (ppkm)	00.00	22.00

In April 2022, an additional zero-emission bus incentive of 22 pence/kilometre was introduced.

From 1 January 2014, the Department for Transport (DfT) has paid an annual grant to eligible local authorities in England to replace the Bus Service Operators’ Grant (BSOG) for tendered services. Until September 2018, this had been paid direct to the bus operators.

== Scotland ==
BSOG was devolved and has been administered separately in Scotland since 1 April 2010. The link with fuel duty was formally severed from this date with payments being calculated on live service-kilometres run, not fuel consumption. This slightly favoured rural bus routes whose fuel efficiency is slightly higher than urban buses which have more stop-start driving. This also disincentivised less fuel efficient buses and 'dead milage' for bus movements between an operator's depots.

Fuel	Grant	Period
basic rate	14.4 (p/km)	--
Biodiesel	+17.0 (p/km)	--
LEB	+5.0 (p/km)	>5 years (from 2019)
ULEB	+10.0 (p/km)	>5 years (from 2019)
Zero-Emission Capable	+15.0(p/km)	>5 years (from 2019)
Effectively Zero Emission Bus	+30.0(p/km)	>5 years (from 2019)

BSOG was replaced by the Network Support Grant on 31 March 2022.

=== Network Support Grant ===
This is paid at a flat rate of 14.4 p/km and includes terms and conditions to consult with relevant local transport authorities on timetabling, respond positively and quickly to reasonable requests from local transport authorities to amend service patterns, hours of operation, vehicles used or levels of provision, and to communicate changes to services with Transport Scotland, and the public in a timely fashion.

== Wales ==
The Department for Transport administers BSOG on behalf of the Welsh government who set the BSOG rates and fund the scheme in Wales. The UK government raised Fuel Duty by 2p/litre in 2007, but the Welsh Government, and the Scottish Government refused to provide a compensatory increase in BSOG rates, with both devolved administrations citing budget difficulties following declines in budget consequentials from that year's UK government spending review.

== Northern Ireland ==
Transport was not de-regulated in Northern Ireland in 1985 and bus services are delivered through Translink. The Department for Infrastructure provided the Fuel Duty Rebate until it was withdrawn entirely in 2013. The rebate has not since been reinstated.
