= Fuel Price Escalator =

The Fuel Price Escalator (later Fuel Duty Stabiliser), a fuel duty policy in the United Kingdom ahead of inflation, was introduced in March 1993 as a measure to stem the increase in pollution from road transport and cut the need for new road building at a time of major road protests, at Twyford Down and other locations. Set initially at 3% above inflation it was increased in two stages to 6% before being suspended and then, in 2011, replaced by a 'fuel duty stabiliser' (also known as the 'fuel price stabiliser' and 'fair fuel stabiliser') following further increases in the price of oil.

== History ==
=== Fuel Price Escalator ===
At a time of rapidly rising concerns about the effect of road transport on the environment, and in particular from the program of road building which had resulted in major road protests, at Twyford Down and other locations, the Conservatives under John Major introduced a 'Fuel Price Escalator' in March 1993 set initially at 3% ahead of inflation per year, increased to 5% later in the same year, and then increased again to 6% in 1997 by the Blair ministry after Labour won power.

The last rise due to the escalator took place following the budget on 9 March 1999 at a time of rapidly increasing oil prices. In 2000 at a time of rising protests at the cost of fuel Gordon Brown announced that the prices would only be increased by inflation due to the high price of oil.

=== Fuel Duty Stabiliser ===
Increases were deferred for a number of budgets and then in 2011, at a time of rapidly increasing oil prices, George Osborne cut 1p from the tax, increased the Petroleum Revenue Tax to raise at additional £2bn from North Sea oil firms, and announced that the escalator would be replaced with a 'fuel price stabiliser'. but would rise if oil prices fell below $75 per barrel.

In the 2011 budget the Chancellor had also announced a rise of 1p in January 2012 and then 5p in August 2013, but later cancelled the 1p rise and reduced the 5p August rise to 3p in November 2012. In the budget of 2012 Osborne confirmed the 3p August rise, before first postponing it and then cancelling it in December 2012. A further proposed inflation-based increase in fuel duty was cancelled by the chancellor in March 2013.

In March 2016, with oil prices at about $40 a barrel, and following widespread speculation that the duty would be increased at a time of record low oil prices, the chancellor froze fuel duty for the sixth year running, and reduced the tax on North Sea oil firms.

== See also ==
- Energy policy of the United Kingdom
- Energy use and conservation in the United Kingdom
- Elasticity (economics)
