= Shadow toll =

A shadow toll is a contractual payment made by a government per driver using a road to a private company that operates a road built or maintained using private finance initiative funding. Payments are based, at least in part, on the number of vehicles using a section of road, often over a 20- to 30-year period. The shadow tolls or per vehicle fees are paid directly to the company without intervention or direct payment from the users.

On more recent shadow toll schemes in the United Kingdom, payments reduce as the number of vehicles increases, to encourage availability of the road rather than the number of vehicles carried.

== History ==
First proposed by the UK Government in 1993, shadow tolls have been widely used in the UK and also to a more limited extent in other countries, including Belgium, Canada, Finland, Netherlands, Spain and the United States. Portugal introduced schemes in 1999 but replaced these with the public tolls in 2004.

The use of shadow tolls in the UK has reduced over time with PFI funded project payments being made based primarily on the availability of the road, and not on the number of vehicles using it. Beyond a certain number of vehicles, the 'toll' paid by the government in more recent schemes is zero.

== Criticism ==
The World Bank observes that transaction costs 'can be very high' due to the difficulties surrounding legal arrangements and the need for continuous vehicle counts. The use of shadow tolls has led to significant criticism in The Netherlands.

The Portuguese government removed shadow tolls in 2004 after finding that "payment obligations in connection with the shadow toll system were not compatible with the need to spend on improving and maintaining the other national motorways".

== List of shadow toll roads ==
=== Europe ===
United Kingdom

- M1 Lofthouse to Bramham link road
- M40 Denham to Warwick
- M80 Stepps to Haggs
- A1 Darrington to Dishforth
- A1(M) Alconbury to Peterborough
- A13 Limehouse to Wennington (Greater London)
- A19 Dishforth to Tyne Tunnel
- A249 Stockbury (M2) to Sheerness
- A30 / A35 Exeter to Bere Regis
- A417 Gloucester to Cirencester
- A419 Swindon to Cirencester
- A50 Stoke to Derby link
- A55 Llanfairpwll to Holyhead
- A69 Carlisle to Newcastle

Belgium

- A605 / E25 Cointe Tunnel

Finland

- VT4 / E75 Järvenpää-Lahti

Netherlands

- A9 Wijkertunnel

Spain

- Madrid M-45
- Rande Bridge

=== Oceania ===
Australia

- Peninsula Link: Victoria, Australia

=== Middle East ===
Israel

- Highway 431

=== North America ===
Canada

- New Brunswick Highway 2 Fredericton to Moncton

== See also ==
- Toll road
- Highways Agency

== External websites in relation to North American shadow tolls ==
- A GUIDEBOOK TO THE BIPARTISAN INFRASTRUCTURE FOR STATE, LOCAL, TERRITORIAL, AND TRIBAL GOVERNMENTS AND OTHER DEPARTMENTS
