= Durham City congestion charge =

English congestion charge

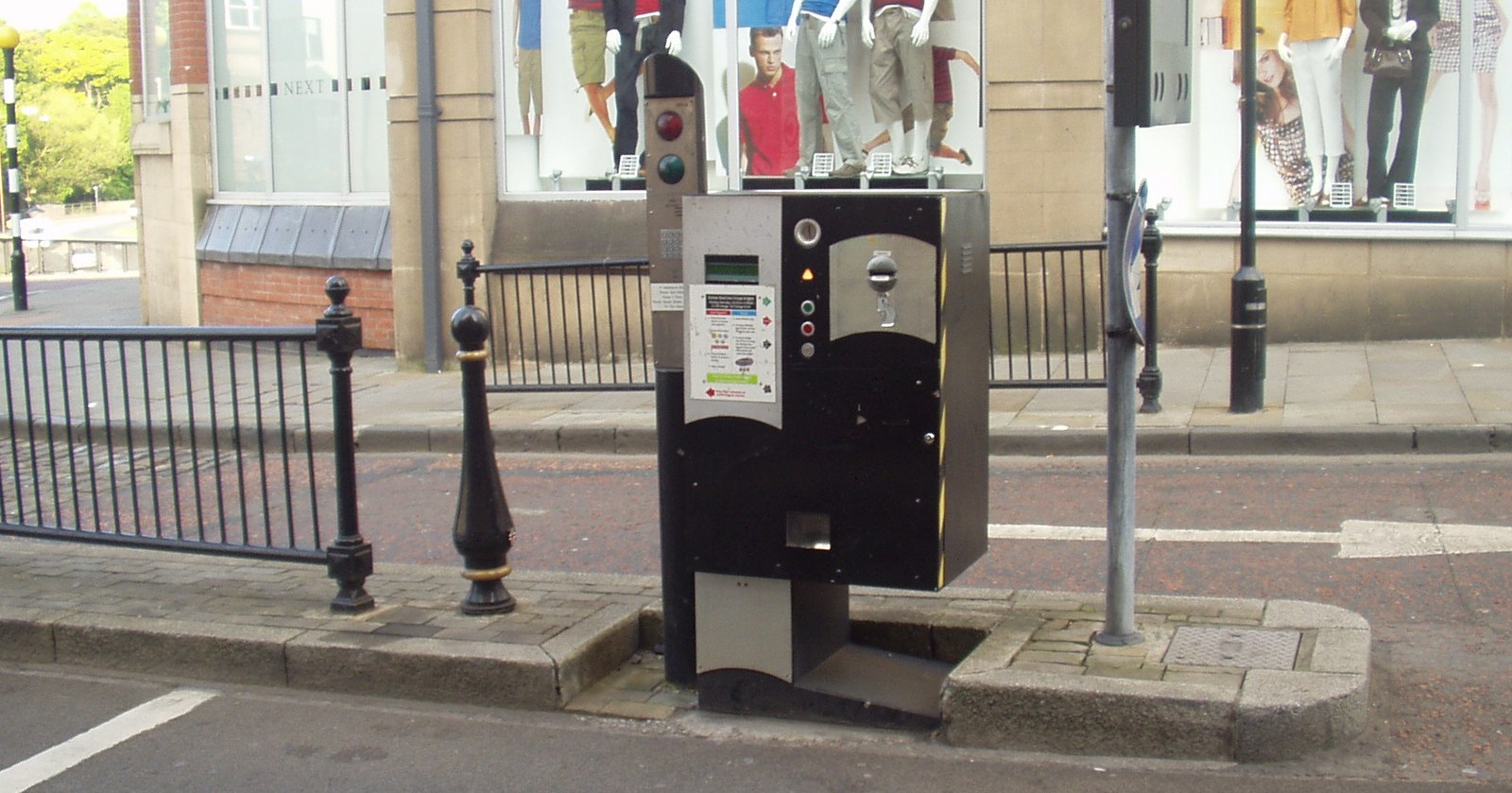
The former charging zone pay booth at exit. The system now uses automatic number plate recognition.

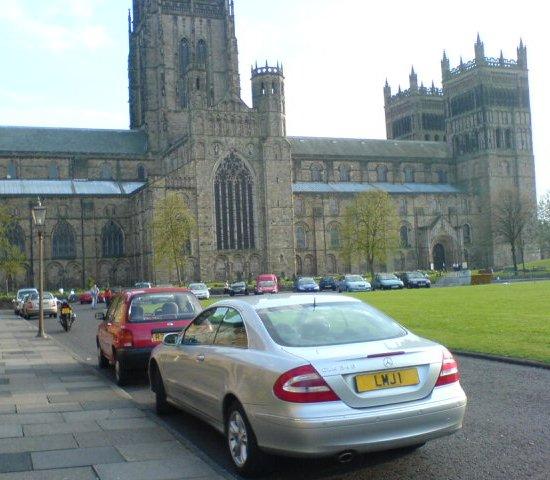
Since October 2002 - drivers have been charged a fee to access the very heart of Durham City, leading up to the Cathedral, Castle and Palace Green (shown here)

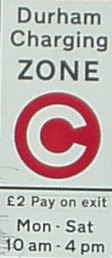
Sign on entrance

The Durham City congestion charge was the first congestion charge to be introduced in the UK in October 2002.

Durham County Council introduced the toll for drivers using 1,000-year-old Saddler Street in the city centre which stands on the peninsula above the River Wear. This is the only public access road leading to the World Heritage Site of Durham Cathedral and Durham Castle. It was introduced mainly to reduce traffic flow using the road.

Before the introduction of the congestion charge around 3,000 vehicles used the road daily. The narrow street, built centuries ago to cater for nothing bigger than a horse and cart, is used by up to 17,000 pedestrians a day, and, according to Durham County Council a "conflict between the two was causing traffic congestion, environmental problems and road safety hazards, as well as detracting from the experience of the World Heritage Site". A year after the charge had been introduced, figures showed vehicle activity using the road fell by 85%. Until 2011, traffic was controlled by a rising bollard in the road, which was monitored by CCTV and linked to an intercom system.

It was reported in late April 2007 that since October 2002, the retractable bollard has been responsible for "300 instances of car damage". According to Durham County Council, "the vast majority are very, very minor, resulting in damage such as a bent number plate."

On 22 January 2011, The Northern Echo reported that Durham County Council was consulting on replacing the bollard with an automatic number plate recognition system. As part of works on Saddler Street in the summer of 2011 the charge was temporally suspended and a new ANPR system installed, the system was reinstated on 25 July but the charge was not enforced until 29 August to allow for the registration of exempt vehicles.

== See also ==
- Congestion pricing
- Cambridge Congestion Charge
- London congestion charge
- Motoring taxation in the United Kingdom
- Manchester congestion charge
