= 2023 Auckland Anniversary Weekend floods =

New Zealand natural disaster

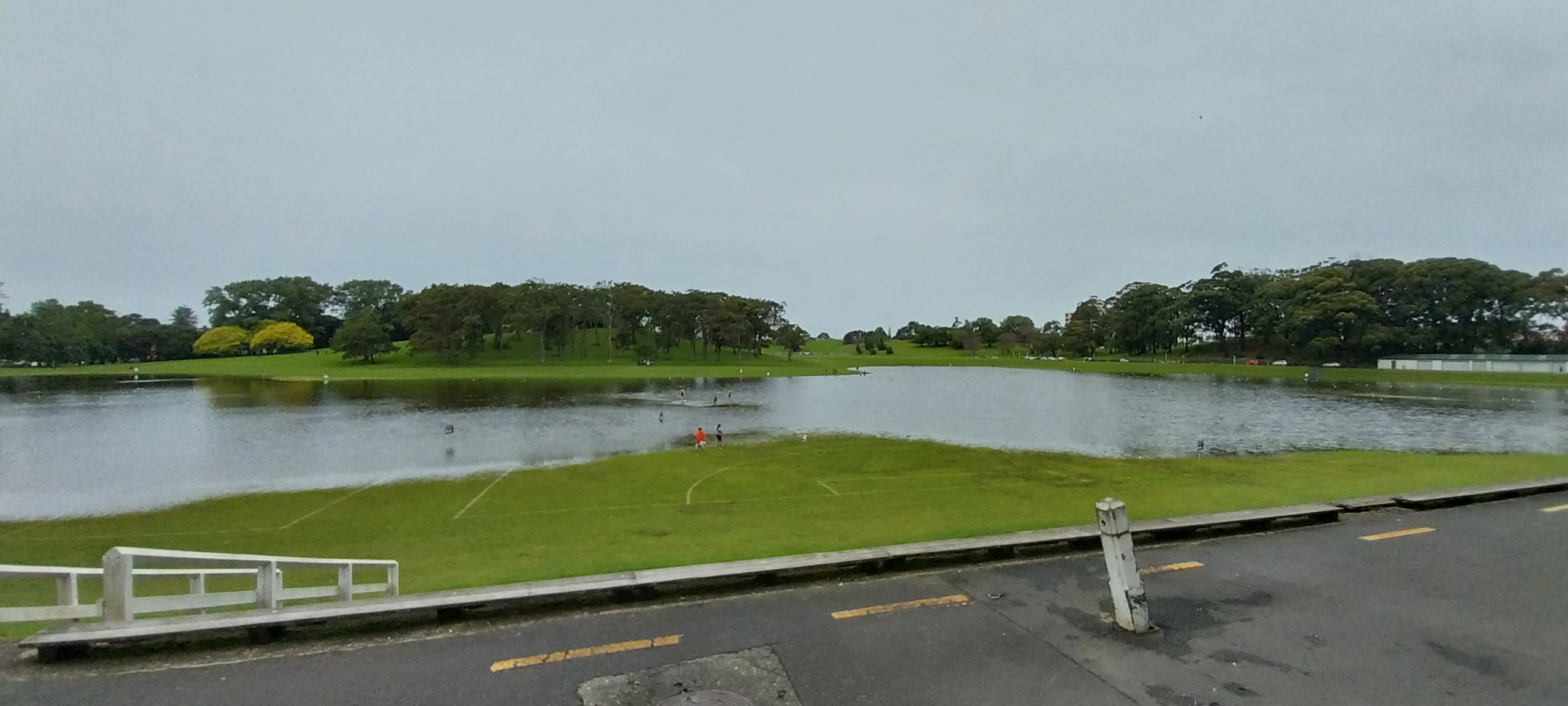
- Cricket pitches in Pukekawa Auckland Domain during the floods

Meteorological history
- Date: 27 January 2023 (3 years ago)

Flood
- 360-minute sustained (6 hours)
- Max. rainfall: 16 cm (6.299 in)

Overall effects
- Fatalities: 4
- Damage: NZ$2.2 billion (US$1.4×10^{9} in 2023)
- Areas affected: Upper North Island, New Zealand

Beginning on Friday, 27 January 2023, regions across the upper North Island of New Zealand experienced widespread catastrophic floods caused by heavy rainfall, with Auckland being the most significantly affected as the Auckland Anniversary holiday weekend began.

Severe flash flooding occurred across Auckland from around 5:00 pm on 27 January local time, after heavy rain in the afternoon. Flooding was widespread across the city, with West Auckland and the North Shore being the worst affected areas. The National Institute of Water and Atmospheric Research reported that an entire summer's worth of rain fell within one day in what it described as a 1-in-200-year event. The event is considered to be the worst flooding in Auckland's modern history. Over the following days other areas of the upper North Island were impacted.

Minister of Finance Grant Robertson stated at the time that the event was New Zealand's costliest non-earthquake event ever, although this record was broken only two weeks later when Cyclone Gabrielle impacted the country.

== Background ==
In January 2023, Auckland and the upper North Island experienced relentless maritime heatwave conditions caused by the annual La Niña cycle and exacerbated by climate change. Heavy rain plagued the northern and eastern areas of the country through most of January, with flooding events shortly after New Year, and Tropical Depression Hale impacting the country on 10 and 11 January. Before the events of 27 January, there was already sentiment brewing among some in the country that the summer of 2022–23 was the country's "worst summer ever".

According to Victoria University of Wellington climate scientist James Renwick and University of Auckland urban planning lecturer Timothy Welch, Auckland, along with many other areas in the country, experiences ageing stormwater infrastructure systems which are unable to cope with population growth and the impact of climate change. Tar seals and concrete surfaces on roads, carparks, and buildings also prevent rainwater from dispersing into the ground, causing water to pool up and surfaces to flood during heavy rain events. Significant flooding events had previously occurred in Auckland in August 2021 and March 2022.

== Timeline ==
Rainfall at Auckland, Whitianga, and Tauranga Airports between 27 January and 2 February View source data.

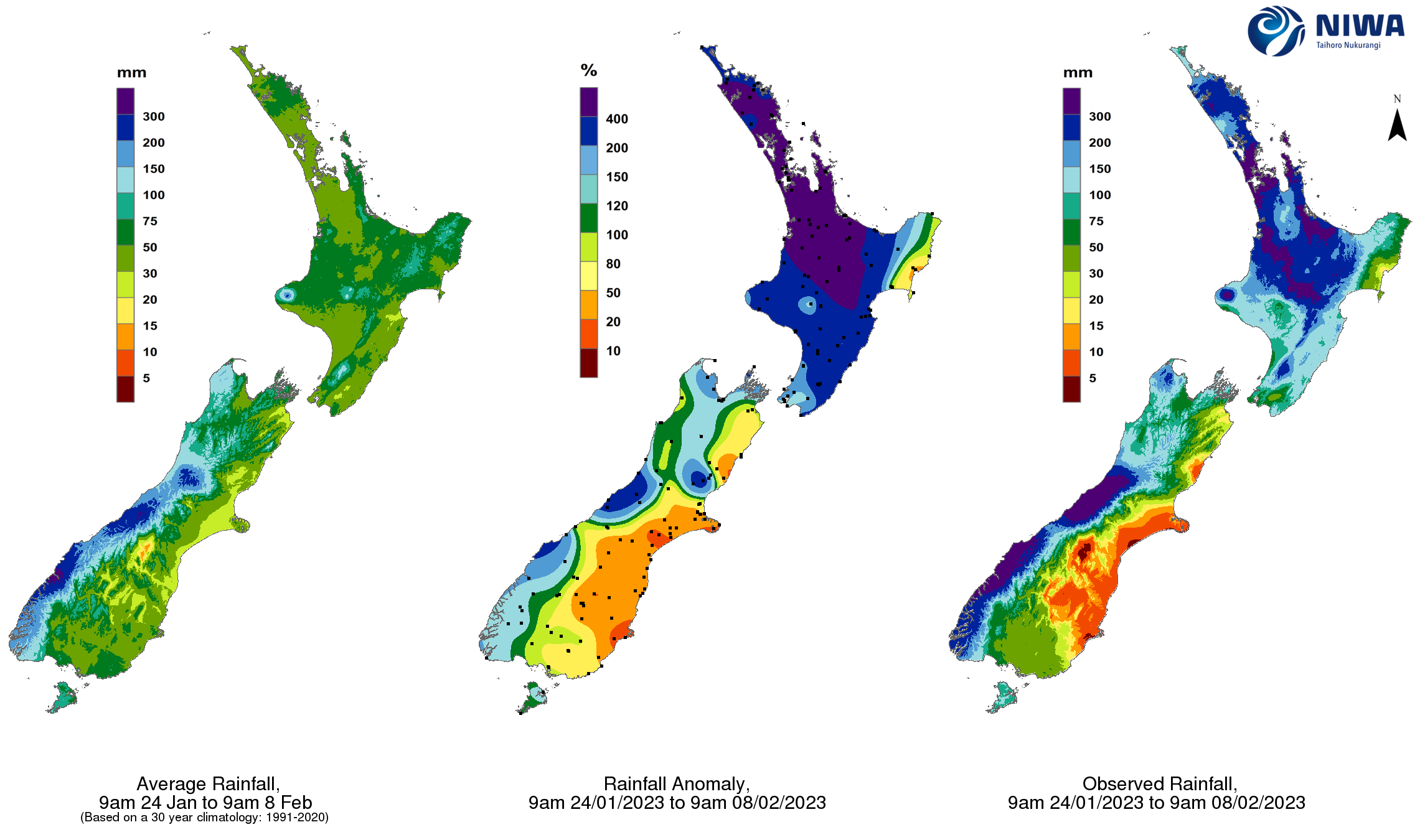
Average rainfall, rainfall anomaly, and observed rainfall from 24 January to 8 February 2023, NIWA

=== Late January ===
From 27 January, a tropical atmospheric river carrying a long band of rain and thunderstorms lay mostly stationary over the upper North Island, blocked by a large anticyclone to the southeast of the country which prevented it from moving south across New Zealand. This atmospheric river was brought down into the New Zealand area by the remnant low left behind by Tropical Depression 06F, which moved south into the Tasman Sea.

According to the National Institute of Water and Atmospheric Research (NIWA), Auckland Airport received more than its average monthly rainfall for January (201 mm; 7.9 in) within one day on 27 January. By 10:00 pm on 27 January, other locations in Auckland had reported record daily rainfalls before the day was over; the Museum of Transport and Technology (MOTAT) had had 238.4 mm (9.39 in), Albany had had 260.6 mm (10.26 in), and Māngere had had 242 mm (9.5 in). The highest daily rainfall occurred in Māngere, with a total of 265 mm (10.4 in). Metservice also reported that 299.5 mm (11.79 in) of rain fell at Albert Park in a span of 34 hours. The peak 2-minute rainfall in Māngere was 4.2 mm (0.17 in). Some parts of the city had over 400 mm (16 in) of rain within a week. 27 January was declared the wettest day in Auckland on record, with 258 mm (10.2 in) of rain at Auckland Airport exceeding the previous record of 161.8 mm (6.37 in). January 2023 was declared the wettest month ever in central Auckland by NIWA, with the total of 539 millimetres (21.2 inches) surpassing the 420 mm (17 in) recorded in February 1869.

Some flooding also occurred in the Northland region on 27 January. On 28 and 29 January, the rain spread south of Auckland, causing widespread flooding in the Waikato and Bay of Plenty regions, with some flooding in the Gisborne region. On 31 January, NIWA forecast that the atmospheric river moving through the upper North Island would once again reach Auckland between midnight and dawn. NIWA also reported that a subtropical low-pressure system was predicted to hit Northland that afternoon.

=== Early February ===
Following lighter rain on 30 and 31 January, areas of Auckland flooded for a second time on the morning of 1 February after more heavy downpours. MetService reported that about 20–30 millimetres per hour (0.79–1.18 inches per hour) of "intensive rainfall" had fallen in parts of Auckland in the early hours of 1 February. Auckland Emergency Management reported there were landslides and flooding in Devonport. Flooding was reported in several areas including Sandringham, St Lukes, near Eden Park, Onehunga, and Wairau Valley. Whangarei Airport in Northland reported 60 mm (2.4 in) of rain between 9:00 pm on 31 January and 4:00 am on 1 February, with half that amount falling around 9:00 pm.

After the heaviest rains subsided, the risk of landslides in Auckland and across other areas of the North Island persisted due to the extreme amount of water in the soil. Even light rains presented the threat of further slips.

On Saturday 4 February, no rain fell at Auckland Airport for the first time since the floods began.

=== Other events ===
While the North Island was being impacted by extreme weather, MetService confirmed that the humid tropical air that had been brought into the New Zealand area also caused some severe weather in the South Island. Severe thunderstorms impacted some areas of Otago and Southland, while the eastern South Island including parts of coastal Canterbury, Otago, and Southland experienced heatwave conditions at the beginning of February. Heavy rain along the western coast of the South Island caused some slips and minor flooding in the West Coast and Tasman regions, closing a portion of SH 6 on Sunday 5 February, while a small tornado hit Greymouth just after midnight on Monday 6 February.

On 28 January, the Interislander ferry Kaitaki lost power while sailing between Picton and Wellington in Cook Strait at around 5:00 pm. The ship drifted towards Sinclair Head in rough seas churned up by the weather system impacting the North Island. The crew managed to restore some power and made it to Wellington at around 9:00 pm with the assistance of tugboats. The power outage was determined to not have been caused by the weather.

Cyclone Gabrielle brought further severe weather to the North Island from Sunday 12 February to Thursday 16 February, killing 11 people.

The upper North Island, particularly Auckland, experienced another significant flooding event a few months later on Tuesday 9 May, resulting in one death.

== Preparations ==
The events of Friday 27 January were largely unexpected, with only orange rain warnings having been issued before the beginning of the event. On the evening of 27 January MetService upgraded the orange rain warning in Auckland to a red rain warning, the highest level of warning available, while the city was already flooding.

In anticipation for more heavy rain arriving on Tuesday 31 January and Wednesday 1 February, MetService issued red rain warnings again for Northland, northern Auckland, Coromandel, and parts of the Bay of Plenty, while an orange rain warning was issued for southern and central Auckland. St John bolstered resources across the upper North Island, supermarkets closed their doors early, and residents raced to clean up debris from the first flooding event in preparation for the possible second flooding event. A state of regional emergency was declared in Northland on 31 January in anticipation of the event, which was rescinded the following day after the event turned out to not be as bad as anticipated in the region.

While no phone alerts were issued during the initial events on Friday, on Sunday 29 January, at 7:47 pm, Auckland Emergency Management issued an emergency alert across Auckland via the cellular phone network, warning of possible heavy rain and thunderstorms over the following 12-hour period. Another alert was issued at 3:32 pm on Tuesday 31 January, warning of more rain north of Orewa over Tuesday and Wednesday.

== Impact ==
The flooding in Auckland on 27 January affected 25 suburbs in the city, closed major motorways, and left 6,000 to 8,000 homes in need of damage assessment. Multiple slips threatened or destroyed buildings across the city, including a Manukau Coastguard building at French Bay / Otitori Bay. On 28 January shortly before midnight, a landslide in Tauranga destroyed a house. As of 12:00 pm on Wednesday 8 February, 277 red placards, 1,615 yellow placards, and 2,566 white placards had been issued on buildings across Auckland. As of Monday 27 February, there were 357 houses with red placards and 943 houses with yellow placards. A red placard indicates the building is unsafe to enter, a yellow placard indicates the building has restricted access, and a white placard indicates minimal damage.

Emergency services in Auckland responded to 719 weather incidents, answered 2,242 emergency calls, and made 126 rescues on Friday and Saturday morning. A total of 811 water damaged cars had to be manually removed from roads, while 20 water damaged buses were removed from service. Mayor of Auckland Wayne Brown stated that over 200 lifts were reported to not be working across the city after the floods, potentially isolating elderly residents at the top of apartment buildings, but Age Concern Auckland CEO Kevin Lamb stated that they had not had any calls about elderly people experiencing difficulties because of lift outages.

A second event in Auckland on 1 February resulted in several homes, businesses, and roads being inundated by flooding, with major slips being reported. 44 families with 168 members were placed into emergency accommodation after this event, while Fire and Emergency New Zealand responded to 63 incidents, including rescues. In total, 1313 injury claims were made to ACC in relation to the floods.

The New Zealand Insurance Council predicted that the event will result in the highest number of weather related insurance claims on record, with insurance companies expecting that this will be the costliest weather event in New Zealand ever. AA Insurance stated that the floods were its largest vehicle claims event in history, with an estimated 10,000 cars expected to be written off. Perils estimated the insurance loss was about NZ$2.2 billion (US$1.43 billion). The previous costliest weather event in New Zealand history for insurance claims was a hailstorm in Timaru in 2019 that caused NZ$171 million of insurance damage. The event also surpassed the total cost of NZ$351 million of weather-related insurance claims in New Zealand during the entirety of 2022, which was previously the highest number in a year ever. Auckland mayor Wayne Brown estimated the cost to recover from the event is about NZ$4 billion (US$2.6 billion).

=== Deaths and evacuations ===
Four people died on 27 January; two drowned in Wairau Valley on the North Shore, one was killed by a slip in Remuera, and one drowned in the Waikato town of Onewhero, with thousands forced to evacuate their homes. Two children were reported missing in Auckland during the night of Saturday 28 January, and were later found with a woman.

It was expected that hundreds of pets and livestock would need medical care after the Auckland floods. Countless numbers of animals were lost and died in the floods.

On Saturday 28 January, severe flooding in the Waitomo District of the Waikato region resulted in many evacuations, particularly around the town of Te Kūiti.

More people had to be evacuated during the second flooding event in Auckland on Wednesday 1 February.

=== Infrastructure damage ===
==== Roading network ====
By 11:36 pm on Friday 27 January, the NZ Transport Agency announced multiple state highway closures in the Auckland region due to slips, flooding, tree clearing, and storm damage, among other damage on local roads and streets controlled by Auckland Transport. State highway closures included:

- SH1 Brynderwyn
- SH12 multiple locations
- SH1 Dome Valley
- SH1 Puhoi
- SH16 between Kumeū and Wellsford
- SH1 Esmonde Road, Takapuna
- SH1 Greville Road, Pinehill
- SH20A Kirkbride Tunnel, Māngere

Multiple other roads were closed in other parts of the island as the rain moved south, while roads across Auckland were closed again on Wednesday 1 February after a second flooding event. A large slip on SH25A, widely considered to be a lifeline for the Coromandel Peninsula in nearby Waikato Region, caused significant disruption in the area. At 4:49 pm on 29 January, Auckland Transport reported 45 local roads in the region were closed or had reduced lanes.

==== Public transport and rail network ====
Flooding on the evening of 27 January resulted in widespread diversions and cancellations across Auckland's public transport network.

Several in-service buses were flooded on the Northern Busway. The busway later re-opened with speed restrictions and single-lane operations. 20% of bus services were cancelled on the morning of 28 January as a result of driver unavailability and water damage to vehicles due to flooding at depots.

Service on train lines was progressively suspended as slips worsened in several locations from 4pm. Train operations resumed several days later at a reduced frequency with speed restrictions. Water was pumped out of Waitematā railway station (then called Britomart) and the City Rail Link over the next several days. The second flooding event on 1 February forced all trains on the Western Line to stop running.

Some ferries were cancelled and inner-harbour services slowed as a result of debris in the Waitematā Harbour.

The North Auckland Line was expected to be out of action until at least June. On Sunday 29 January at around 4:30 am, flooding in the Bay of Plenty region caused a freight train to derail near the town of Te Puke when the weight of the train caused the sodden tracks to collapse.

==== Auckland Airport ====
Auckland Airport suffered severe flooding on its runway and terminal buildings on 27 January.

A Qantas flight bound for Sydney with 200 passengers aboard was stuck on the tarmac, unable to move or be evacuated, with all of its occupants having to stay there overnight. An Air New Zealand Boeing 777-300ER, operating a flight from Melbourne, veered off the runway after landing during the storm and struck several runway edge lights. The Transport Accident Investigation Commission (TAIC) later found that although the severe weather contributed to the runway excursion, the primary cause was a late autopilot disengagement and inadequate manual control during final approach. An Emirates flight en route from Dubai and an American Airlines flight from Dallas both turned around and returned to their departure airports.

On 28 January, the domestic terminal re-opened at noon. The international terminal re-opened on the morning of Sunday 29 January.

On 30 January, more than 25,000 passengers were expected to fly out of Auckland Airport.

==== Power and water ====
At the peak of the event on 27 January, approximately 26,500 homes in Auckland were without power, and by 11:36 am on Saturday 28 January, 23,000 had had their power restored. As of 12:21 pm on Sunday 29 January, 700 homes across Auckland were still without power, while residents of western suburbs were left without water after a slip caused 30 metres of pipe to be washed away in Titirangi. Watercare set up tankers for residents without water and all other parts of the city continued to receive tap water that was safe to drink. The second flooding event on 1 February resulted in 3,000 homes losing power. Northpower reported that 500 of their customers had experienced power cuts, and the Northland town of Waipu experienced a power outage.

Four of Auckland's sewage pumping stations were flooded during the events of 27 January, rendering the stations inoperable and causing wastewater spillage into Waitematā Harbour.

=== Institutions and business ===
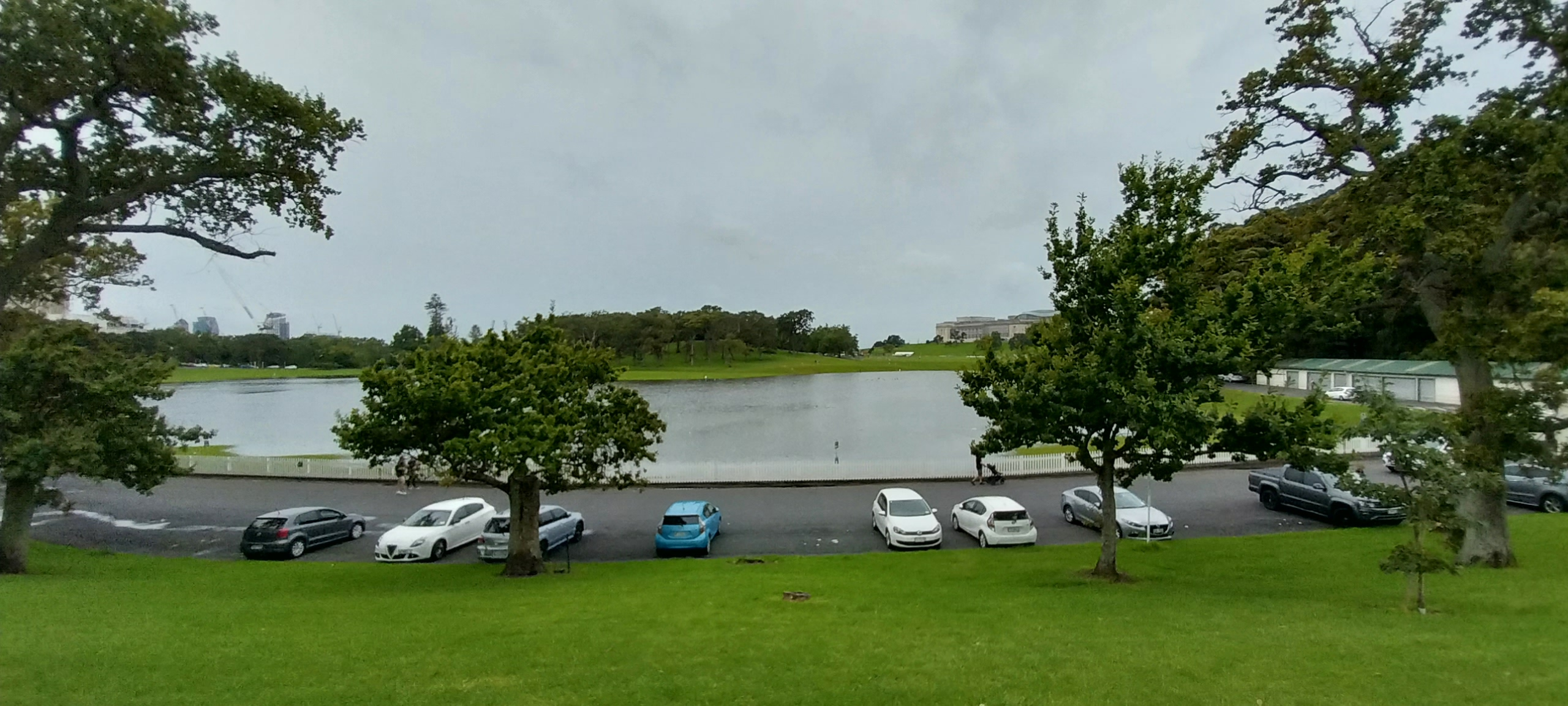
The extreme flooding created a lake in Pukekawa / Auckland Domain, adjacent to the Auckland War Memorial Museum

Kelly Tarlton's Sea Life Aquarium and several chain-owned supermarkets were closed due to extreme flooding on 28 January. The Auckland War Memorial Museum was closed on 28 January, and a lake formed in the lower elevation area of Pukekawa / Auckland Domain that was once a wetland. The basement of the Auckland Art Gallery flooded, requiring 300 artworks to be relocated and assessed by a team of 30. Auckland Zoo was also affected and major flooding occurred in lower-lying areas, after animals like American alligators, bearded dragons and skinks had to be evacuated to higher ground; a kōtare and a zebra finch died, and their bodies were recovered.

The Glenbrook Vintage Railway was also temporarily closed due to flooding damage, while in Northland the Bay of Islands Vintage Railway was temporarily closed due to flood and rain risks.

AA Insurance have also reported claims over NZ$10 million worth of luxury vehicles were "written off" after floodwaters ravaged a North Shore dealership during the floods, leaving at least 50 vehicles seriously damaged. Cars including Volvos, Range Rovers, Jaguars, and others were impacted.

On Monday 30 January, The Ministry of Education had advised all 557 schools, numerous universities, polytechs and early childhood care centres across the Auckland Region to be closed until Tuesday 7 February for further damage assessment. Later, this decision was revised and education centres were allowed to reopen on Thursday 2 February.

=== Events ===
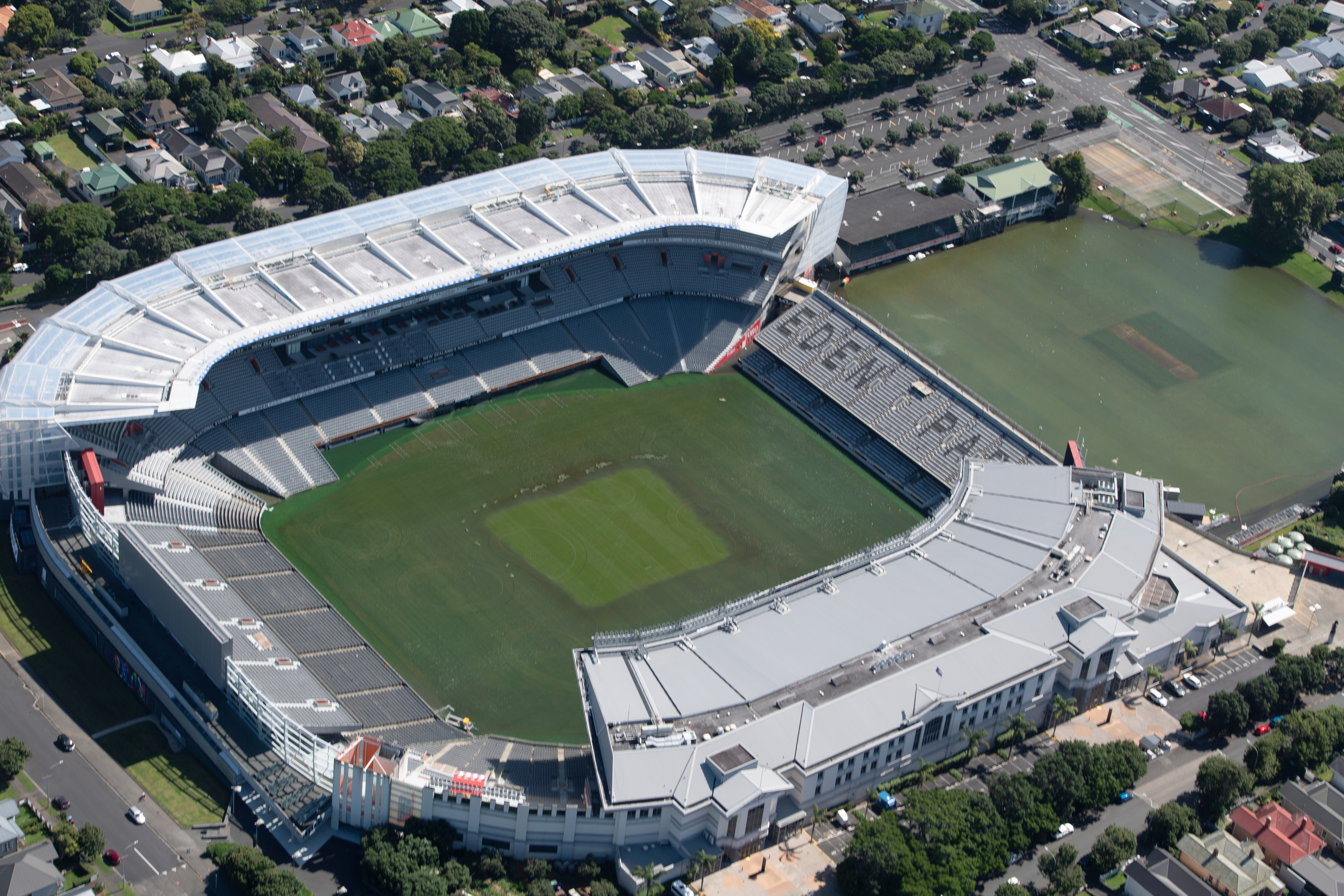
Flooding in Eden Park on 1 February

Many events which had been planned for the holiday weekend were cancelled. Elton John shows on Friday 27 and Saturday 28 January, as well as the Laneway Festival on Monday 30 January, all in Auckland, were all cancelled due to the flooding and safety concerns, as were some sports events at Eden Park. The Friday night Elton John concert, which 40,000 people were expected to attend, was cancelled shortly before it was due to begin, after 11,000 concert-goers had already arrived. Some people ran into difficulty in floodwaters during the commute home. The weekend's One Love Festival in the city of Tauranga, and the Festival One in Karapiro, Waikato, were also cancelled because of safety concerns and logistics from heavy rain. The Auckland Lantern Festival, scheduled to run from Thursday 2 February to Sunday 5 February in Auckland, was also cancelled for the fourth year in a row. A Fatboy Slim show scheduled for Saturday 28 January in Napier was cancelled, while his show scheduled for Tuesday 31 January on Waiheke Island was postponed until Thursday 2 February. His headlining act at the Gardens Music Festival on 29 January was relocated to Spark Arena.

=== Mental health ===
After suffering repeated flooding events in August 2021, March 2022, January 2023, and later February and May 2023, a widespread sense of collective trauma emerged across the Auckland region. The scale and frequency of such events traumatised a large population of people at around the same time, with many facing a sense of stress, anxiety, and helplessness. Residents who had been flooded multiple times reported feeling symptoms of PTSD during periods of rain, including not being able to sleep at night in anticipation of the following day's weather forecast.

== Responses ==
=== Agencies and organisations ===
Mayor Wayne Brown declared a state of regional emergency in Auckland at about 9:30 pm local time on Friday 27 January, which was made public at 10:22 pm. It was the first time a state of regional emergency has been declared in Auckland since the current system was introduced in 2002. The National Emergency Management Agency issued instructions for Aucklanders to only call 111 if life is in imminent danger, as Fire and Emergency New Zealand received over 1,500 calls within three hours in the evening.

From 9:56 pm on 27 January, Auckland Emergency Management (AEM) opened Civil Defence Centres to assist displaced people and those needing assistance, first in Kelston, then Wairau Valley and South Auckland, then Māngere East and Māngere Bridge, then Albany. The Government provided NZ$1,100,000 to the city of Auckland via the Mayoral Relief Fund to assist with the recovery after the floods, surpassing the previous highest ever total of NZ$300,000 given to Nelson after floods there in August 2022, as well as providing an additional NZ$700,000 to areas across the whole of the North Island. The New Zealand Defence Force provided assistance in the flood recovery and clean-up, as did the Student Volunteer Army and the Red Cross.

On Saturday 28 January, a state of local emergency was declared in the Waitomo District in the Waikato region after significant flooding, which was rescinded on Monday 30 January, while on Friday 3 February, a state of local emergency was declared in the Thames-Coromandel District in response to slips in the area blocking crucial roads and isolating communities.

On Thursday 9 February, the states of emergency in place in Auckland and the Coromandel were extended in anticipation of Cyclone Gabrielle impacting the country.

On 14 May, the New Zealand Government allocated NZ$941 million from the 2023 New Zealand budget to address flood and cyclone damage caused by both the Auckland Anniversary Weekend floods and Cyclone Gabrielle in the North Island. Of this amount, NZ$275 million would be allocated to NZ Transport Agency and local councils to repairing damaged roads, NZ$200 million to repairing railways, NZ$117 million to repairing damaged schools, and NZ$35 million to covering various health services including mental health, general practitioners and frontline health workers. The New Zealand Treasury estimated that the total damage from both the Auckland floods and Cyclone Gabrielle to be between NZ$9 billion to $14.5 billion; with NZ$5 to $7.5 billion being related to infrastructure owned by central and local government.

=== Individuals ===
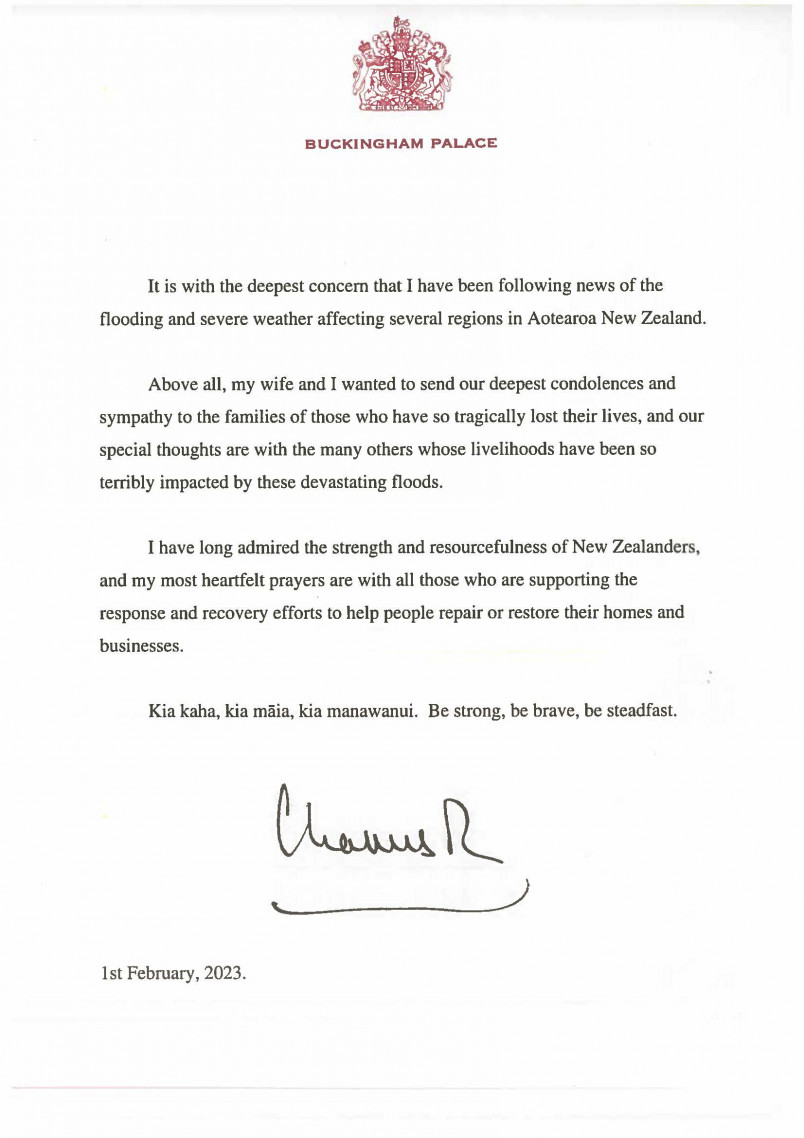
Message from Charles III to those affected by the flooding and severe weather in the North Island in January 2023

On 28 January, Prime Minister Chris Hipkins and Minister for Emergency Management Kieran McAnulty departed Wellington for Auckland for a daylong visit, landing in Whenuapai shortly after 1:00 pm. They then received a briefing from emergency services, visited some affected communities in West Auckland, and assessed the damage from a helicopter. Hipkins toured damaged areas of the city again on Wednesday 1 and Thursday 2 February.

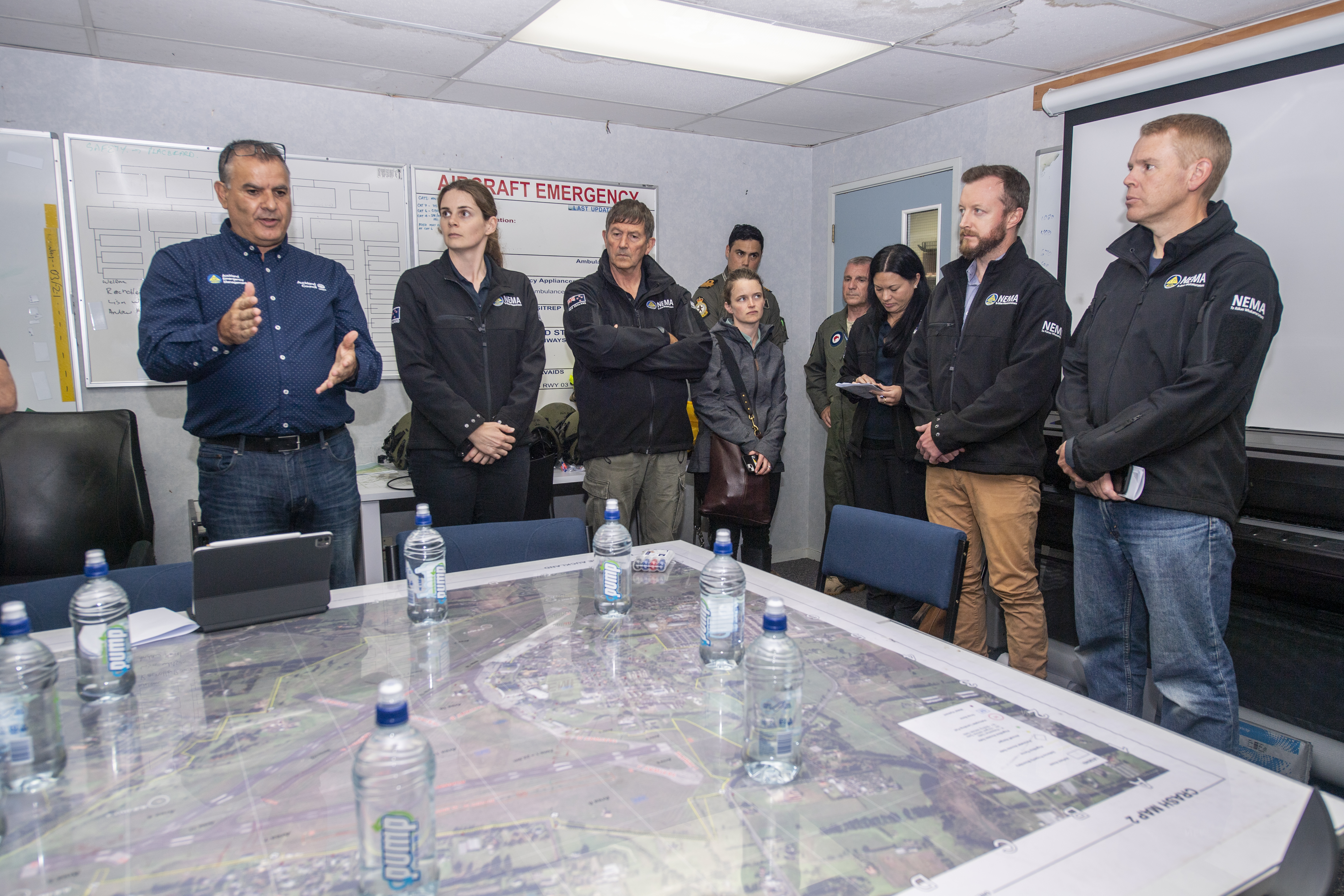
Chris Hipkins and Minister for Emergency Management Kieran McAnulty being briefed on the floods by Civil Defence

On 30 January, Chris Hipkins and Wayne Brown both stated in separate statements to media that the event is the result of climate change.

On Tuesday 31 January, Hipkins, who only became Prime Minister two days before the flooding began, revealed a new Labour Party caucus. Part of the new caucus was the revival of the role of Minister for Auckland, partly in response to the flooding in the city. Michael Wood was given the role.

On Thursday 2 February, (Note: 1 February in the United Kingdom) New Zealand's head of state King Charles III sent his condolences to the victims of the floods.

=== Criticism of Wayne Brown ===
Brown declared a state of emergency immediately after the AEM advised him to do so, hours after the extreme weather began, but was widely criticised for his response, which was said to show hesitation and a lack of presence. When questioned on the poor level of preparedness on RNZ by Kim Hill, in a rare public interview, he was unable to confirm whether or not text alerts had been sent out to Aucklanders (which Hill had to clarify to him that they had not been) or if tap water was safe to consume. He then claimed it was "a bit early" and "not helpful" to ask if the floods were caused by climate change. When she asked if his administration's "level of inability to cope was terrifying" he answered "it's definitely worrying. But this is an unprecedented event. It will be interesting to see just how well prepared Wellington is when the earthquake strikes." Wellington as a city is extremely vulnerable to earthquakes; this prompted condemnation for his mocking remarks. Hill challenged him for what she described as "a low blow under the circumstances." He then stated that the delay in declaring an emergency was due to how busy Fire and Emergency workers were, and not something he was responsible for. Brown expressed frustration at fellow officials, accusing them of not providing information to him in a timely manner.

At 3:30 pm on Saturday 28 January, Chris Hipkins and Wayne Brown attended a press conference in West Auckland. Brown was criticised for his performance during the conference as he defended his response to the floods. National Party MP Gerry Brownlee, who led the Government's response to the earthquakes in Canterbury, Christchurch, and Kaikōura, accused Brown of "washing his hands" of any responsibility, and said that his response to the event was "somewhat inexplicable". On 30 January, Brown announced an inquiry will take place into the response from both him and his office in the first 24 to 48 hours of the event.

Following the event, there were calls from the public for Wayne Brown to resign as Mayor of Auckland, with a petition for his resignation being set up on Change.org.

On Tuesday 31 January, leaked text messages between Brown and a tennis-based WhatsApp group chat were reported on by the NZ Herald, where he complained on 28 January that "I’ve got to deal with media drongos over the flooding tomorrow so sadly no tennis for me tomorrow." On Wednesday 1 February, the NZ Herald reported on a phone call which occurred between Brown and a Herald reporter on 30 January, where Brown exclaimed "Don't fuck me over" and "I am the mayor for three years. You can’t do anything about that." Brown expressed that he felt misunderstood, and complained about the lack of media coverage of his generally unannounced visits to impacted areas, while also later expressing regret at the leaked conversations, and admitted he needs to improve his communication.

=== Other criticism ===
Transport agency Waka Kotahi was criticised after staff responsible for providing updates during the event clocked off for the holiday weekend at 7:30 pm on 27 January while many roads across Auckland were flooding. They resumed updates at 10:30 pm after being instructed to by Minister of Transport Michael Wood. Waka Kotahi apologised on Monday 30 January.

Auckland Transport was criticised after they issued 259 infringements over the weekend after the floods on Friday 27 January, issuing fines for various issues such as parking violations and expired WoFs. After the agency's chief executive was spoken to by Deputy Mayor of Auckland Desley Simpson, group manager of parking services and compliance John Strawbridge said all fines issued between 2:00 pm on Friday and 9:00 am on Wednesday 1 February would be waived.

The Civil Defence emergency alert text messages were sent to Aucklanders about the rain 48 hours after the city was hit by the devastating floods. National Emergency Management Agency, which is a Government agency, received criticism for the 48 hour delay, as the flooding first struck on the evening of 27 January and the alerts were sent out at 7:47 pm on 29 January.

The event sparked discussions about the many natural rivers and wetlands across Auckland city that had been paved over with largely waterproof chipseal during development, with calls being made to daylight Auckland's streams and rivers in order to better cope with heavy rainfall events.

=== Managed retreat ===
In response to the North Island floods, several West Auckland residents established an advocacy organisation called "West Auckland is Flooding" (WAIF) in February 2023 to lobby the Auckland Council and New Zealand Government to implement a scheme to relocate people from at-risk properties using insurance payouts and public funding. The group's formation was in response to hundreds of homes in West Auckland being yellow and red-stickered, rendering them uninhabitable as a result of flood damage. The group's chairman Lyall Carter said that many of its members' homes had experienced flooding in both 2021 and January 2023. Following Cyclone Gabrielle in February 2023, Labour Member of Parliament and former cabinet minister Phil Twyford called on the Government to buy out flood damaged homes in the Te Atatū on the grounds that frequent flooding made it "irresponsible and impractical" to rebuild.

In February 2023, the Government confirmed that it was designing a managed retreat strategy for those who lost their homes as a result of the Auckland Anniversary Weekend floods and Cyclone Gabrielle. The Government also indicated that it would incorporate managed retreat into its Climate Change Adaptation Bill. Prime Minister Chris Hipkins also confirmed that he would meet with Climate Change Minister James Shaw to incorporate climate change adaptation into disaster responses.

In early October 2023, the Auckland Council voted unanimously to accept a proposed cost sharing arrangement with the Government to fund over NZ$2 billion in flood recovery and resilience works. This deals including buying out hundreds of "category 3" flood-damaged properties.

=== Inquiries ===
On 12 April 2023, Bush International Consulting released its independent review into the Auckland Council's emergency management system during the floods. The review had been commissioned by Mayor Brown to examine the responses of all parties, including himself, professionals, and the Government to the floods. The review was led by former Police Commissioner Mike Bush. It found that the council's emergency management system was unprepared for the floods, that Council staff were aware of gaps in preparing for superstorm emergencies but had failed to act, that communications and relationships between key Council and civil defence policy-makers were "insufficiently inclusive" in critical early stages, a failure of leadership among Council and civil defence senior leaders, and that a centralised planning and delivery model weakened local knowledge that would have better supported local communities. The Bush review covered the 48-hour period from January 27 but focused on the first 12 hours of the emergency response. It made 17 recommendations to the council for future extreme weather events, including proposing a separate review into Auckland Emergency Management's prevention, preparedness and planning, the development of new standard operating procedures for extreme weather events in Auckland, better training and resources for emergency management personnel, and more frequent emergency management training exercises. Brown accepted the recommendations of the Bush Report and stated that he had "dropped the ball" during the events of 27 January 2023.

In late June 2025, a coroner's inquest into 18-weather related fatalities during the Auckland Anniversary Weekend floods and Cyclone Gabrielle commenced in Auckland. The inquest was chaired by Coroner Erin Woolley, with the first phase taking place in Auckland between late June and August 2025. By mid August 2025, the first phase of the coroner's inquest had scrutinised the deaths of four people during the Auckland Anniversary Weekend Floods along with the local emergency management response.

== See also ==
- 2021 central New Zealand floods
- 2023 in New Zealand
- Cyclone Gabrielle
- List of natural disasters in New Zealand
- List of disasters in New Zealand by death toll
