= Chris Hipkins =

Prime Minister of New Zealand in 2023

The Right Honourable Chris Hipkins MP
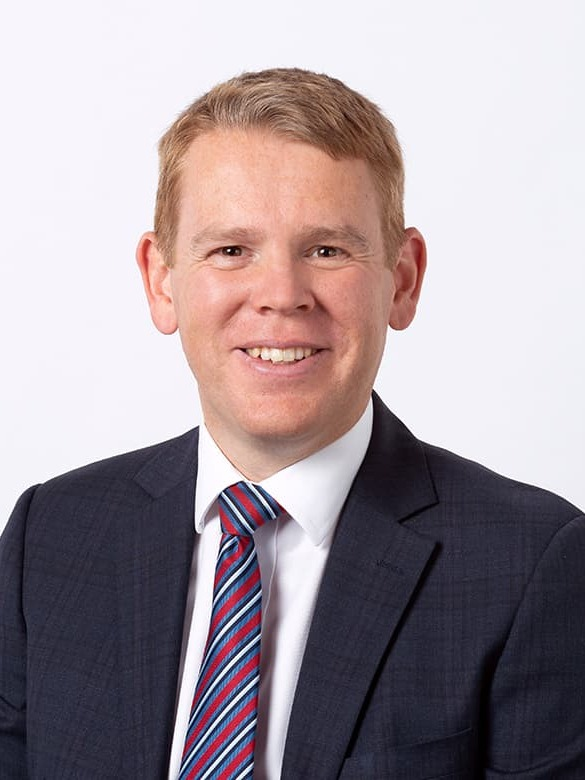
- Official portrait, 2022

41st Leader of the Opposition
- Incumbent
- Assumed office 27 November 2023
- Prime Minister: Christopher Luxon
- Deputy: Carmel Sepuloni
- Preceded by: Christopher Luxon

41st Prime Minister of New Zealand
- In office 25 January 2023 – 27 November 2023
- Monarch: Charles III
- Governor-General: Cindy Kiro
- Deputy: Carmel Sepuloni
- Preceded by: Jacinda Ardern
- Succeeded by: Christopher Luxon
Ministerial offices
Minister of National Security and Intelligence
In office 25 January 2023 – 27 November 2023
Prime Minister	Himself
Preceded by	Jacinda Ardern
Succeeded by	Christopher Luxon
Leader of the House
In office 26 October 2017 – 25 January 2023
Prime Minister	Jacinda Ardern
Preceded by	Simon Bridges
Succeeded by	Grant Robertson
Minister of Education
In office 26 October 2017 – 25 January 2023
Prime Minister	Jacinda Ardern
Preceded by	Nikki Kaye
Succeeded by	Jan Tinetti
Minister of Public Service
In office 26 October 2017 – 25 January 2023
Prime Minister	Jacinda Ardern
Preceded by	Paula Bennett
Succeeded by	Andrew Little
Minister of Police
In office 14 June 2022 – 25 January 2023
Prime Minister	Jacinda Ardern
Preceded by	Poto Williams
Succeeded by	Stuart Nash
Minister for COVID-19 Response
In office 6 November 2020 – 14 June 2022
Prime Minister	Jacinda Ardern
Preceded by	Office established
Succeeded by	Ayesha Verrall
Minister of Health
In office 2 July 2020 – 6 November 2020
Prime Minister	Jacinda Ardern
Preceded by	David Clark
Succeeded by	Andrew Little

18th Leader of the Labour Party
- Incumbent
- Assumed office 22 January 2023
- Deputy: Kelvin Davis; Carmel Sepuloni
- Preceded by: Jacinda Ardern

Member of the New Zealand Parliament for Remutaka Rimutaka (2008–2020)
- Incumbent
- Assumed office 8 November 2008
- Preceded by: Paul Swain
- Majority: 8,859

Personal details
- Born: Christopher John Hipkins; 5 September 1978 (age 48) Hutt Valley, New Zealand
- Party: Labour
- Spouse: Jade (m. 2020; div. 2022)
- Domestic partner(s): Toni Grace (2023–present; engaged in 2025)
- Children: 2
- Education: Victoria University of Wellington (BA)
- Nickname: Chippy
- Hipkins's voice Hipkins talking about Education policy, September 2017

Christopher John Hipkins (born 5 September 1978) is a New Zealand politician who has served as leader of the New Zealand Labour Party since January 2023 and leader of the Opposition since November 2023. He was the 41st prime minister of New Zealand from January to November 2023, previously serving as the minister for the public service and minister for education from 2017 to 2023, the minister for health for several months in 2020, and the COVID-19 response from 2020 to 2022. He has been the member of Parliament (MP) for Remutaka since the 2008 general election.

Hipkins was born and raised in the Hutt Valley in Wellington. He was heavily involved in student politics while at Victoria University of Wellington and was elected president of VUWSA twice, in 2000 and 2001. He stood for the typically safe Labour seat of Remutaka in the Hutt Valley in 2008 and won it, albeit by a small margin due to an increased vote for the National Party across the country. After Jacinda Ardern led Labour to victory in the 2017 general election, Hipkins assumed multiple portfolios within the Sixth Labour Government, serving variously as minister of education, police, the public service, and leader of the House. For his perceived competence within multiple roles and responsibilities, he became regarded as Labour's "fixer".

As minister of health, Hipkins was responsible for the government's response to the COVID-19 pandemic in New Zealand. The elimination policy became the primary focus of the 2020 election, helping Labour win in a landslide. After the victory, Hipkins took on more responsibility, serving as minister for COVID-19 response from November 2020 to June 2022.

After Ardern announced her resignation as leader of the Labour Party, Hipkins was elected unopposed, and consequently became prime minister on 25 January 2023. His premiership was faced almost immediately with the 2023 Auckland Anniversary Weekend floods, and then by further flooding from Cyclone Gabrielle. He led his party into the 2023 general election, with Labour losing to National. He became Opposition leader on 27 November 2023.

== Early life ==
Christopher John Hipkins was born in the Hutt Valley on 5 September 1978, the son of Doug and Rosemary Hipkins. His mother is the chief researcher for the New Zealand Council for Educational Research.

Hipkins attended Waterloo Primary School in Lower Hutt and Hutt Intermediate School. He was head boy at Hutt Valley Memorial College (later known as Petone College) in 1996. He studied at the Victoria University of Wellington, where he was student president in 2000 and 2001.

In September 1997, as a first-year student at Victoria University, Hipkins was one of dozens arrested while protesting against the Tertiary Review Green Bill at Parliament. The matter went through the courts, and 10 years later an apology and award of over $200,000 was shared among the 41 protesters. The judge ruled that despite claims by police that the protestors were violent, the protest was peaceful and there were no grounds for arrest.

Hipkins received a Bachelor of Arts with a major in political science and criminology from Victoria University of Wellington. He then worked as a policy advisor for the Industry Training Federation and as a training manager for Todd Energy in Taranaki. Hipkins also worked in Parliament as an advisor to Trevor Mallard and Helen Clark.

== In Opposition, 2008–2017 ==
New Zealand Parliament
Years	Term	Electorate	List	Party
2008–2011	49th	Rimutaka	47	Labour
2011–2014	50th	Rimutaka	30	Labour
2014–2017	51st	Rimutaka	9	Labour
2017–2020	52nd	Rimutaka	7	Labour
2020–2023	53rd	Remutaka	6	Labour
2023–2026	54th	Remutaka	1	Labour
2026–present	55th	Remutaka	1	Labour

=== Standing for parliament (2008) ===
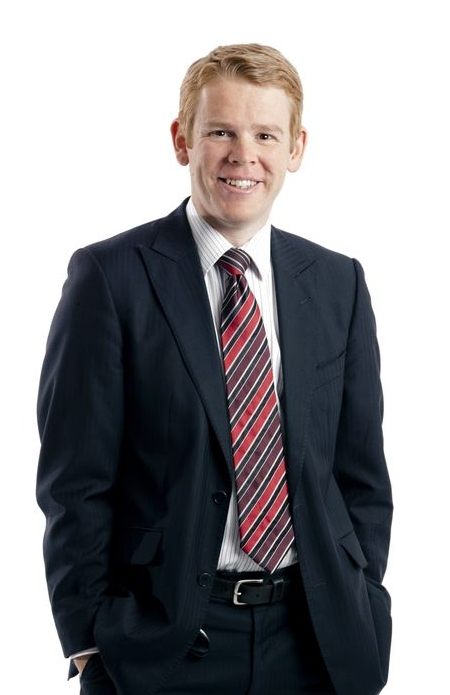
Hipkins in 2011

Hipkins was selected to stand in the Labour-held seat of Rimutaka (renamed Remutaka in 2020) in the 2008 general election, following the retirement of the sitting MP Paul Swain. He contested the Labour Party selection over trade unionist Paul Chalmers, who had Swain's support. His selection was part of Prime Minister Helen Clark's intention to rejuvenate the party, with 29-year-old Hipkins winning against the 54-year-old Chalmers. In his first election, Hipkins won the seat with a modest majority of 753.

=== First term (2008–2011) ===
For the first nine years of Hipkins's parliamentary career, Labour was the Official Opposition. Hipkins's maiden speech set out his interest in education policy. In his first term, Hipkins was the Labour spokesperson for internal affairs and a member of parliamentary committees for government administration, local government and environment, and transport and infrastructure.

In May 2010, his Electricity (Renewable Preference) Amendment Bill was drawn from the member's ballot. The bill would have reinstated a ban on the thermal generation of electricity, which had been imposed by the previous Labour Government in September 2008 before being repealed by the incoming National Government in December 2008, but was defeated at its first reading in June.

=== Second term (2011–2014) ===
In the 2011 general election, Hipkins retained the Rimutaka electorate by an increased margin of 3,286 votes.

In his second term, Hipkins was promoted into Labour's shadow Cabinet as spokesperson for state services and education under new leader David Shearer. He also became the Labour Party's chief whip for the first time. As education spokesperson, Hipkins was outspoken in his opposition to the National Government's implementation of charter schools in New Zealand and closure of schools in Christchurch following the destructive 2011 earthquake. Hipkins continued as education spokesperson under Shearer's successor, David Cunliffe.

In April 2013, Hipkins voted in favour of the Marriage (Definition of Marriage) Amendment Bill, which legalised same-sex marriage in New Zealand.

=== Third term (2014–2017) ===
In the 2014 general election, Hipkins retained Rimutaka by a margin of 6,664 votes. In his third term, Hipkins continued as education spokesperson and additionally served as shadow leader of the House under leaders Andrew Little and Ardern. In late 2015, Hipkins received veiled threats, including a death threat, for voicing his concerns about a billboard advertising "cut-price" guns. In April 2016, his Education (Charter Schools Abolition) Amendment Bill was drawn from the members' ballot, but was defeated at its first reading in November.

== In Government (2017–2023) ==
As a senior Labour MP, Hipkins was a key figure in the Sixth Labour Government. Between 2017 and 2023, he was the sixth-ranked Government minister from the Labour Party and he was assigned responsibilities as minister of education, minister for the public service and leader of the House. He was later looked upon as a "fixer," and was given additional responsibility as minister of health and minister for COVID-19 response during the COVID-19 pandemic in New Zealand, and later as minister of police during a spate of ram raids.

=== Fourth term (2017–2020) ===
In the 2017 general election, Hipkins retained the Rimutaka electorate by a margin of 8,609 votes.

Labour formed a coalition government with New Zealand First, with confidence and supply support from the Greens. Hipkins was appointed a Cabinet minister and given the education portfolio.

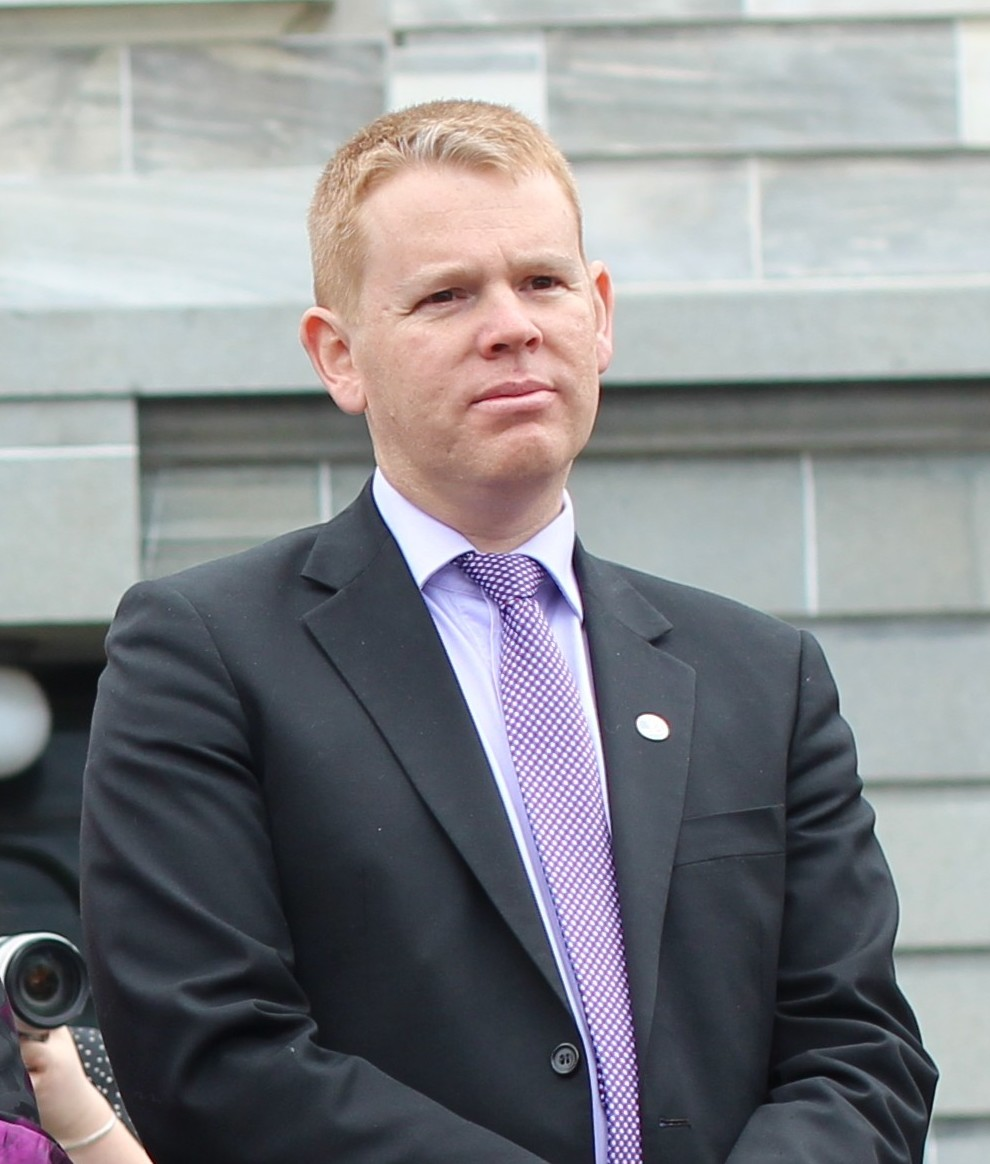
Hipkins at the NZEI strike rally outside Parliament House, 15 August 2018

As education minister, Hipkins supported the abolition of National Standards and charter schools in New Zealand, which were supported by the previous National Government. He signalled a review of the National Certificate of Educational Achievement (NCEA) high school certificate system. However, Hipkins clarified that the Ministry of Education would continue to fund the University of Otago's National Monitoring Study of Student Achievement and the Progress and Consistency Tool (PaCT). The Government's announcement that it would close charter schools drew criticism from the opposition National and ACT parties. In early 2018, Hipkins introduced legislation preventing the creation of new charter schools, while enabling existing charter schools to be converted into special character schools. By September 2018, all twelve charter schools had successfully transitioned to become state-integrated and special character schools.

In December 2018, Hipkins rejected a recommendation by the Council of Victoria University of Wellington to rename the university "University of Wellington", citing the strong opposition to the name change from staff, students, and alumni. Hipkins said that "he was not convinced the university had sufficiently engaged with stakeholders, who should have their views considered."

In February 2019, Hipkins proposed merging the country's 16 polytechnics into a New Zealand Institute of Skills and Technology to counter deficits and declining domestic enrolments. The proposed institute would also take over the country's vocational and apprenticeship programmes. While the Tertiary Education Union, Employers and Manufacturers Union, and the Canterbury Employers' Chamber of Commerce expressed support for the Government's proposal, it was criticised by the opposition National Party, Southern Institute of Technology CEO Penny Simmonds, and Mayor of Invercargill Tim Shadbolt. In response to the Christchurch mosque shootings, Hipkins extended the polytechnic submission timeframe to 5 April 2019.

In early May 2019, Hipkins announced that the Government would be investing NZ$95 million to train 2,400 new teacher trainees through increased scholarships and placements, new employment-based teacher education programmes, and iwi-based scholarships over the next four years to address the teaching shortage. These measures were criticised as inadequate by the Post Primary Teachers' Association and National Party education spokesperson Nikki Kaye.

On 1 August 2019, Hipkins reaffirmed the Government's plan to merge all polytechnics into a single entity in April 2020. In addition, he announced that the Government would replace all 11 industrial training organisations (ITOs) with between four and seven workforce development councils that would be set up by 2022 to influence vocational education and training. While polytechnics were cautiously optimistic about the changes despite concerns about losing their autonomy, ITOs and National's tertiary education spokesperson Shane Reti opposed the changes, claiming they would damage the vocational training system and cause job losses. By 2022, the merger began to strike difficulties including low enrolments, large deficits and resignations of senior staff.

Following the resignation of David Clark as minister of health on 2 July 2020, Prime Minister Ardern appointed Hipkins as interim health minister, serving until the October 2020 general election.

=== Fifth term (2020–2023) ===
Hipkins retained his seat, now known as Remutaka, during the 2020 general election, with a total of 20,497 votes.

He retained the education portfolio and also became the minister for COVID-19 response and minister for the Public Service. As Minister of COVID-19 response, Hipkins instituted the wearing of face masks on public transportation and domestic flights in November 2020, pre-departure test requirements for overseas travellers in January 2021, border restrictions for high risk countries in April 2021, and alert level restrictions in Auckland in August 2021 in response to the COVID-19 Delta variant. He oversaw the launch of the Government's "My Vaccine Pass" vaccine certificate in November 2021, the national vaccination rollout, and the passage of the COVID-19 Response (Vaccinations) Legislation Act 2021, which provided the legal framework for the Government's vaccine mandate.

On 22 August 2021, Hipkins made a comment that attracted controversy and humour when he misspoke during a press conference; encouraging New Zealanders to get tested for COVID-19, he inadvertently urged New Zealanders to socially distance when they go outside to "spread their legs". Commentators suggested that he meant to say, "stretch your legs."

In mid-January 2022, in his capacity as minister for COVID-19 response, Hipkins postponed the next Managed Isolation and Quarantine (MIQ) lottery due to a tenfold increase in imported Omicron cases entering New Zealand. The Government's decision was criticised by Grounded Kiwis member and Australian–based expatriate Maxine Strydom who stated that many New Zealand expatriates were facing emotional and mental stress due to travel restrictions, expiring visas and job losses. Health economist Professor Paula Lorgelly, however, rationalised the postponement of the MIQ lottery as "a short-term pain for what I perceive to be quite a long-term gain."

On 31 January 2022, Hipkins, in his capacity as minister for COVID-19 response, stated that the Government had offered stranded New Zealand journalist Charlotte Bellis a place under the emergency allocation criteria to travel to New Zealand within a period of 14 days. However, he also claimed that Bellis had indicated that she did not intend to travel until late February and that MIQ had advised her to consider moving her travel plans forward. He also confirmed that New Zealand consular assistance had earlier twice offered to help her return from Afghanistan in December 2021. Bellis was an Al Jazeera journalist who, after becoming pregnant, had left Qatar owing to the Gulf state's law criminalising unmarried pregnancies. Bellis had travelled to Afghanistan where she and her partner had visas allowing them to live. Due to New Zealand's strict pandemic border policies, Bellis had struggled to secure a place in the MIQ system. Hipkins was criticised by Bellis's lawyer Tudor Clee for allegedly breaching her client's privacy by sharing personal details about her circumstances and indicated that she was considering "legal options." In response, Bellis stated that she did not give Hipkins consent to share her information and disputed the facts in his statement. MPs Chris Bishop and David Seymour, from National and ACT respectively, also criticised Hipkins's actions, stating that they were "unbecoming" of a minister of the Crown. On 22 June 2022, Hipkins publicly apologised for releasing personal information without Bellis' consent and making inaccurate comments about Bellis travelling to Afghanistan and being offered consular assistance. As a result, Bellis and her partner Jim Huylebroek received online abuse. Hipkins had earlier privately apologised to Bellis in mid-March 2022.

Throughout the spring of 2022, Hipkins, as minister of COVID-19 response, oversaw the easing of several COVID-19 mitigation policies including the isolation requirements for positive cases and contacts, vaccination and vaccine pass requirements for school-age children, MIQ isolation hotels, the COVID-19 Protection Framework, and border isolation requirements. In early May 2022, Hipkins acknowledged that the New Zealand Government was spending NZ$10 million a month paying COVID-19 contact tracers despite phasing out contact tracing several months earlier. He stated that the contact tracers were supporting people with COVID-19 in the community. In response, ACT leader Seymour criticised the Government's decision to continuing funding contact tracing services as a waste of taxpayer money.

In a June 2022 reshuffle, Hipkins was shifted from his COVID-19 response portfolio and replaced Poto Williams as minister of police.

In September 2022, Hipkins apologised to former Finance Minister Bill English for suggesting that he had granted his brothers favourable government contracts. Hipkins had made those remarks during an exchange over the awarding of government contracts to Foreign Minister Nanaia Mahuta's husband Gannin Ormsby.

In mid-October 2022, Hipkins, acting on behalf of COVID-19 response minister Verrall, announced that the Government would scrap several of the COVID-19 Public Health Response Act 2020's provisions including lockdown and MIQ restrictions, border closures, vaccine passes and mandates. The Government however opted to retain the act's provisions for seven-day isolation periods, mask use and border entry requirements until Parliament passed general pandemic legislation. Hipkins also announced that the Government had revoked the Epidemic Notice, signalling a shift from emergency management to long-term management of COVID-19. That same day, Hipkins confirmed that the Government would hold a Royal Commission of Inquiry into its COVID-19 responses.

== Prime Minister (2023) ==
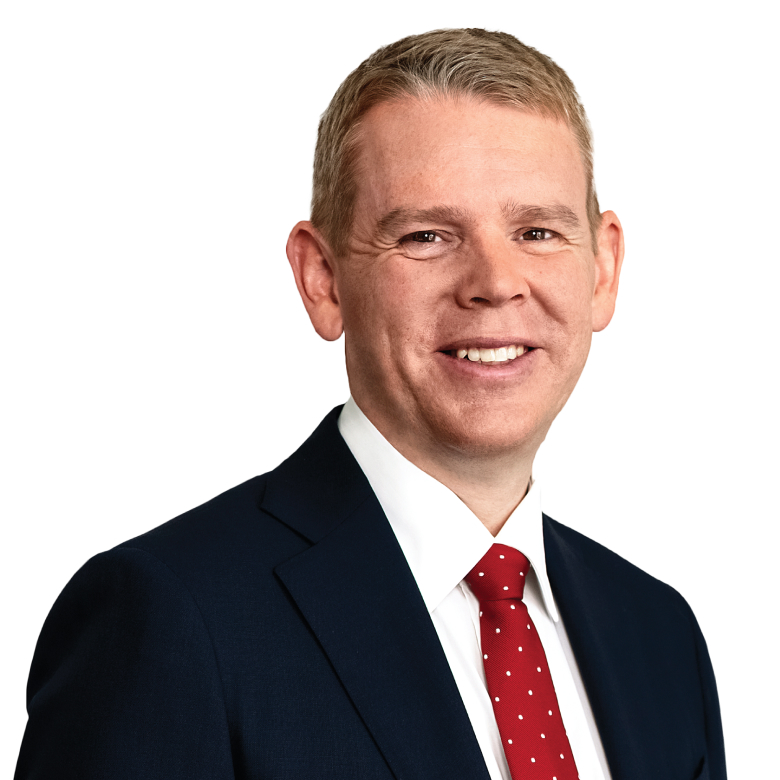
- Premiership of Chris Hipkins; 25 January 2023 – 27 November 2023
- Monarch: Charles III
- Cabinet: Sixth Labour Government
- Party: Labour
- Appointed by: Cindy Kiro
- Seat: The Beehive
- Coat of Arms of New Zealand

=== Nomination and appointment ===
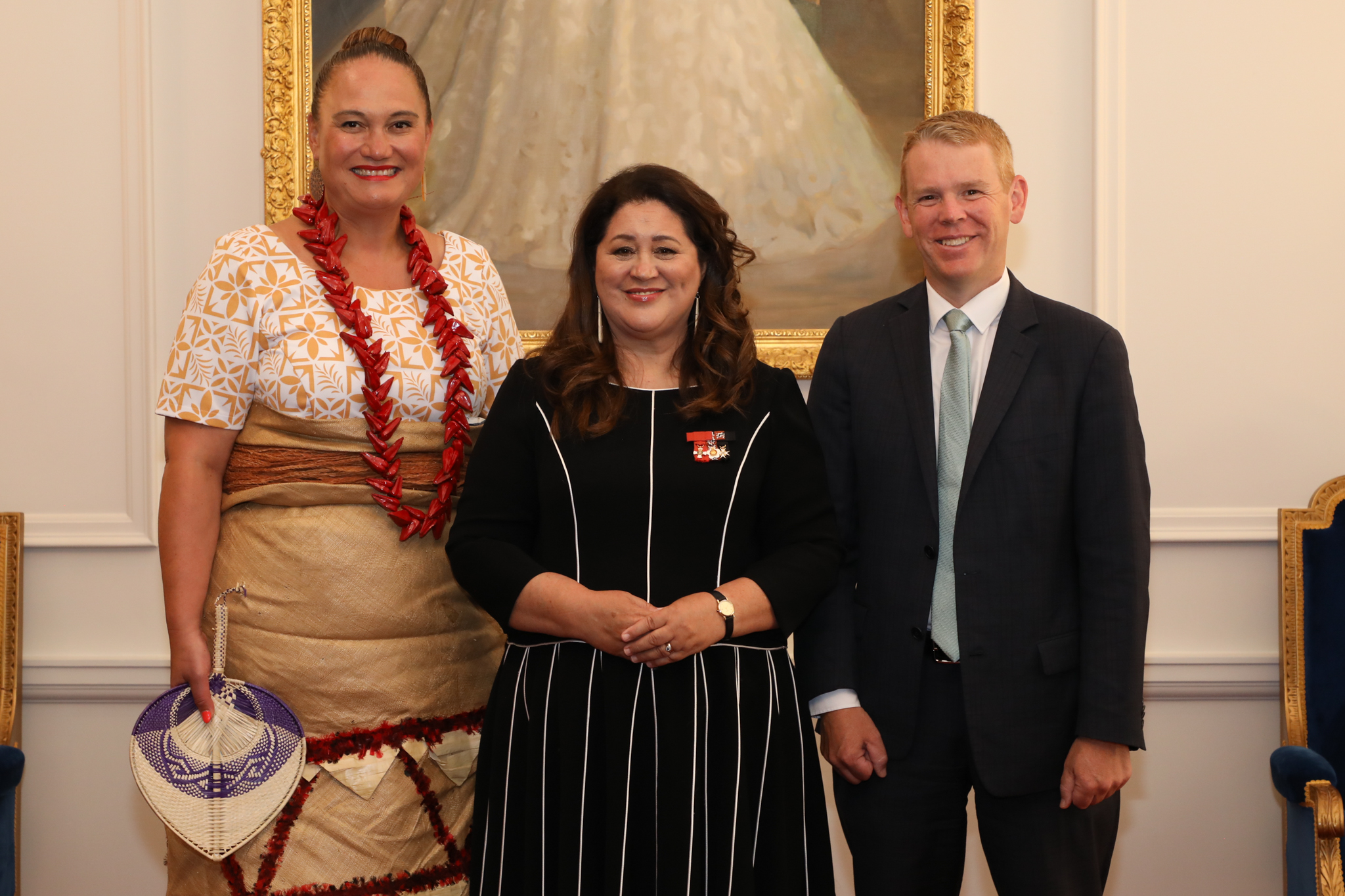
Hipkins (right) and Carmel Sepuloni (left) after being sworn in as prime minister and deputy prime minister, respectively, by governor-general Dame Cindy Kiro on 25 January 2023

On 19 January 2023, Jacinda Ardern unexpectedly announced her resignation as leader of the Labour Party in a media conference, stating that she "no longer had enough in the tank" to do the job. She indicated that she would formally step down no later than 7 February 2023.

Hipkins was confirmed as the only nominee shortly after nominations closed on 21 January. Stuff reported that Kiritapu Allan, the East Coast MP and minister of justice who had been speculated by media as an alternative candidate, was one of the seven MPs who nominated him. Hipkins had previously demurred when asked about his leadership aspirations, stating that he would support whichever candidate the Labour Party could "reach a consensus" on.

Hipkins was sworn in as prime minister by Governor-General Dame Cindy Kiro on 25 January 2023. His deputy prime minister was Carmel Sepuloni, the first Pasifika person to hold the position. Upon taking office, Hipkins addressed the cost of living, saying that New Zealanders will "absolutely see in the coming weeks and months the cost of living is right at the heart of our work program", and declared it his "absolute priority". He indicated that Labour would postpone some of its new projects until after the election to focus on the economy. Politically, he has been cited as a centrist.

=== Domestic politics ===
On 26 January, Hipkins met several Auckland business leaders at a roundtable event hosted by the Auckland Business Chamber, led by former National MP Simon Bridges. At the meeting, he affirmed his Government's commitment to pursuing a constructive relationship with businesses, citing their importance to the New Zealand economy. Hipkins confirmed that business representatives had given the Government feedback on several policy areas including skills shortages. He also said that businesses supported the Government's apprenticeship boost, which created opportunities for them. Earlier, several small business owners including Kiwi Kai business owner Reni Gargiulo, Air Milford CEO Hank Sproull, Christchurch pharmacy owner Annabel Turley, Saint Andrews Dairy Dhaval Amin, and Grownup Donuts owner Daniel Black had called on Hipkins's Government to address various issues including staffing shortages, immigration work visa policies, youth crime, and inflation. In addition, Ashburton dairy farmer Nick Giera called on the Government to scrap the Three Waters reform programme and carbon emissions taxes on the agricultural sector.

Hipkins was faced almost immediately with the 2023 Auckland Anniversary Weekend floods. The flash flooding began on 27 January 2023, and saw an entire summer's worth of rain fall within just a day. On 28 January, Hipkins and Minister for Emergency Management Kieran McAnulty visited Auckland to liaise with emergency services, reassure affected constituents, and assess the damage. Hipkins subsequently attended a press conference in West Auckland with MacAnulty, Mayor of Auckland Wayne Brown, and Minister of Transport Michael Wood.

After Hipkins's ascension to the role of prime minister and his response to the floods, opinion polls saw his personal popularity and that of the Labour Party surge: a 1News–Kantar poll had Labour up 5 percentage points to 38, with National dropping one percentage point to 37; Hipkins also had a net approval of 36 points, with National leader Christopher Luxon trailing on 9 points. Another poll conducted by Newshub–Reid Research had Labour up 5.7 points to 38, ahead of National, which fell 4.1 points, dropping to 36.6.

In February 2023, Hipkins announced that several policies including the proposed TVNZ-RNZ merger and that a biofuel mandate requiring petrol and diesel to contain a certain percentage of biofuel from renewable resources would be scrapped. He confirmed that other policies including the social income insurance scheme, proposed hate speech legislation, and the Three Waters reform programme would be delayed or revised. In the end the hate speech legislation was delayed and not talked about until in March 2024 when the policy was ordered to be scrapped by the newly in power National Party, while the Three Waters Reform programme was eventually passed and promised to be reformed in 2021 by the Labour Party. Hipkins also confirmed that the minimum wage would be raised from NZ$21.20 to $22.70 an hour from 1 April 2023. In response to the January floods, Hipkins confirmed that the Government would invest $3 million in discretionary flood recovery payments, $1 million in supporting flood-affected businesses, and an additional $1 million in mental health support.

On 13 March, Hipkins announced that the Government would scrap several policies and reform programmes including legislation to lower the voting age to 16 years, the speed reduction programme except for the most dangerous 1% of highways, and the $586 million Clean Car Upgrade programme. In addition, the Government announced that it would delay or revise several policies and programmes including proposed alcohol reforms, the container return scheme, public transportation including the Auckland Light Rail, and public consultation on a new test to determine the difference between contractors and employees. The Government would redirect funding to a $2 billion to a welfare package to provide "bread and butter" support to 1.4 million New Zealanders affected by the ongoing "cost of living" crisis. While the Green and Māori parties criticised the Government for backtracking on climate action policies, the National and ACT parties welcomed the scrapping of "wasteful" Government policies but questioned the Government's commitment to change.

On 11 April 2023, Hipkins and Health Minister Verrall announced that the Government would retain the few remaining COVID-19 restrictions including the seven-day mandatory isolation period for positive cases and mask wearing requirements at hospitals for at least two months.

The 2023 New Zealand budget, presented on 18 May 2023, was regarded as cementing Hipkins's dedication to a "no-frills" welfare programme focusing on the cost of living. The budget included many sweeping initiatives to support lower-middle class New Zealanders, including $618.6 million to scrap $5 prescription fees, $1.2 billion to extend 20 free early childhood education hours to include two year olds, $327 million on free public transport for under-13 year olds, and permanent half-price fees for under-25 year olds, and $402 million on expanding the Warmer Kiwi Homes plan. The latter would subsidise heating, insulation, hot water heat pumps, and LED lamps. The budget also allocated $1.9b from the Climate Emergency Response Fund on emissions reductions and adaptation measures. It also included a "huge funding boost" for Te Matatini, putting it on par with the Royal New Zealand Ballet and the New Zealand Symphony Orchestra for the first time in over 50 years.

=== Foreign affairs ===
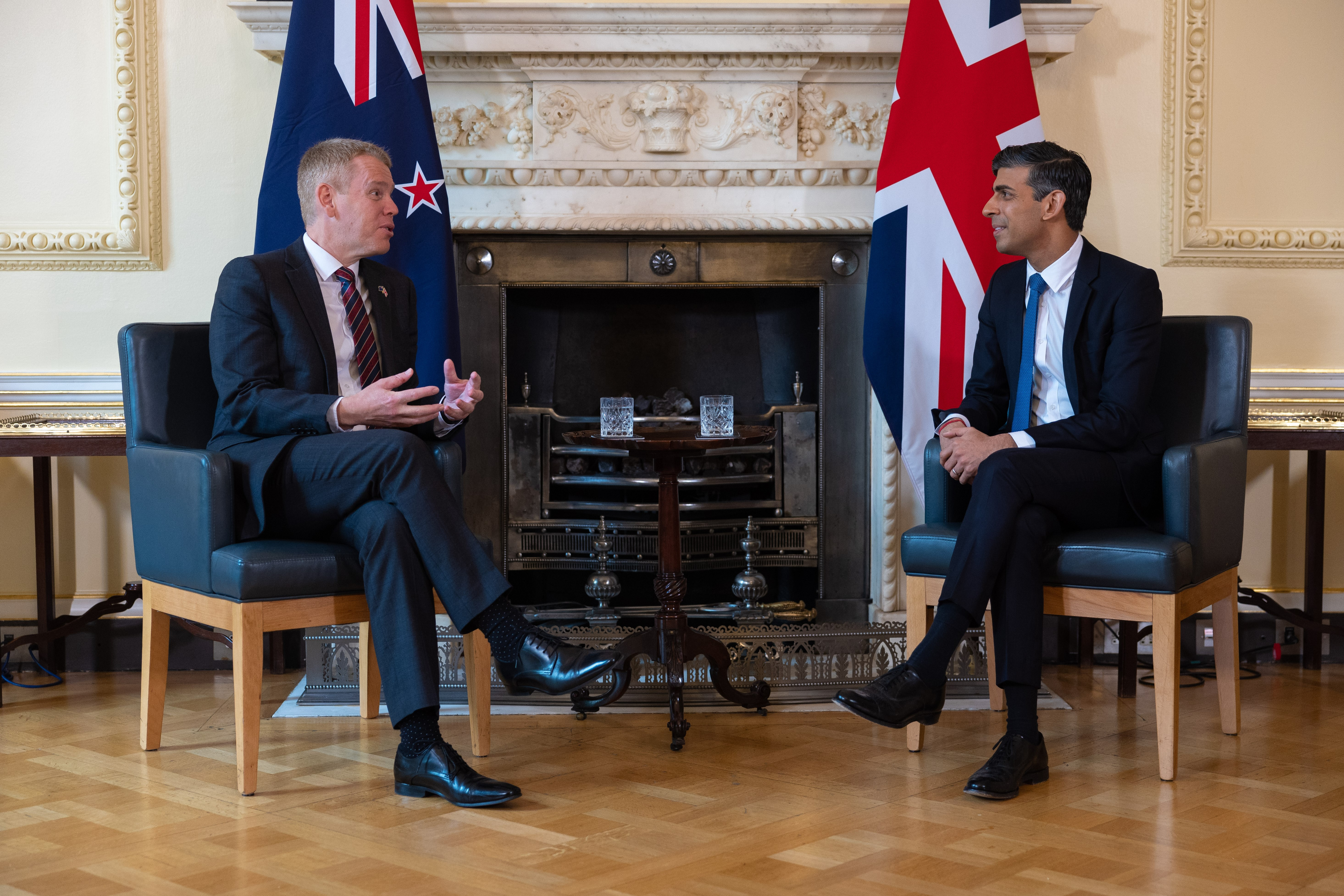
Hipkins with Prime Minister of the United Kingdom Rishi Sunak, May 2023

On 7 February, Hipkins made his first state visit to the Australian capital Canberra, where he met Australian Prime Minister Anthony Albanese. The two leaders reaffirmed Australian–New Zealand bilateral relations and discussed the controversial Section 501 deportation policy. Albanese confirmed that his government would revise the deportation policy to take into account individuals' connections to Australia and the length of time they had lived in the country. The two leaders exchanged gifts, with Hipkins giving Albanese a greenstone pounamu in the shape of a hook and Albanese giving a selection of Australian records.

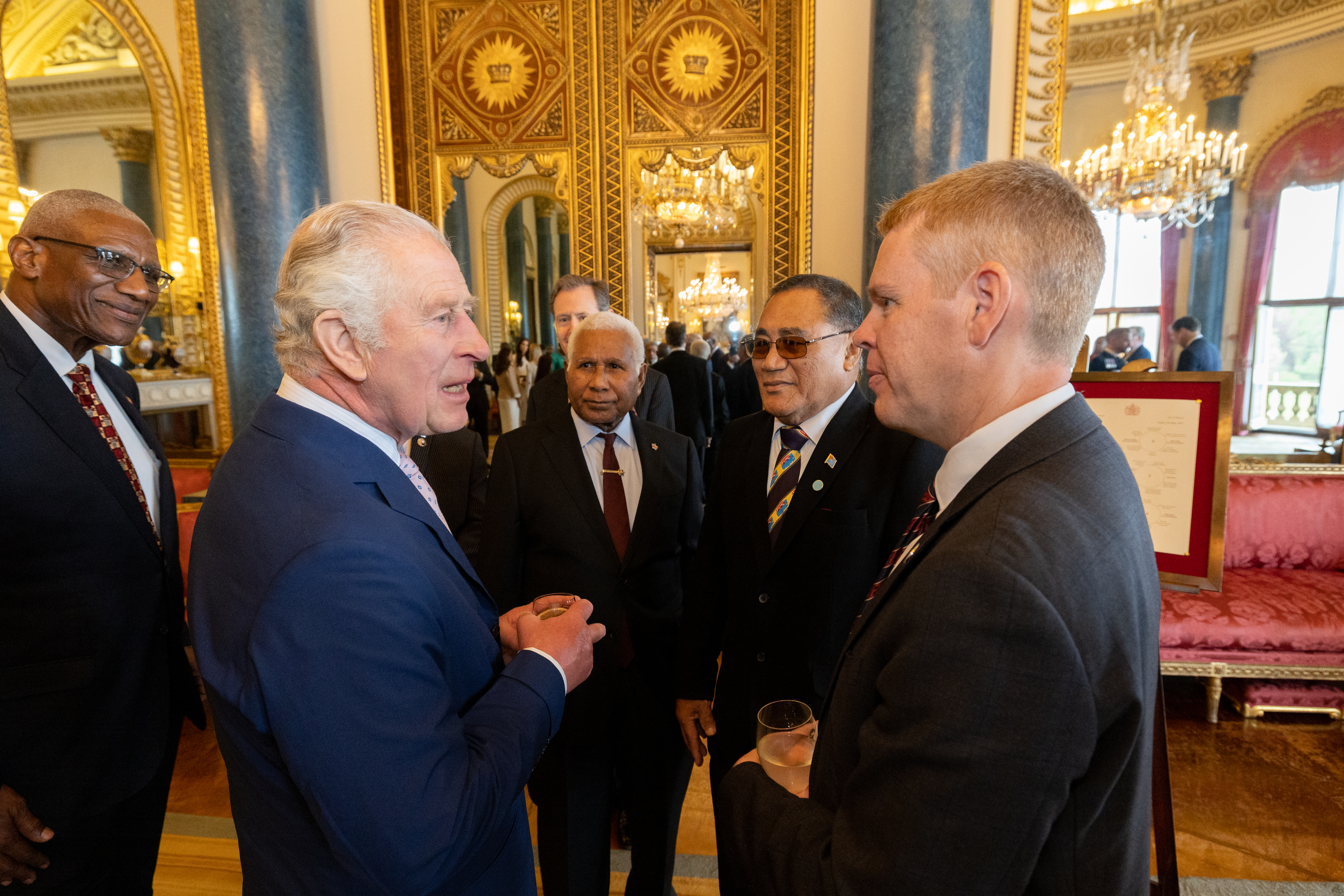
Hipkins with King Charles III at Buckingham Palace, May 2023

In May 2023, Hipkins confirmed that he would attend the coronation of King Charles III on 6 May and extended an invitation to Leader of the Opposition Christopher Luxon. Hipkins confirmed that he would meet with Charles III, British Prime Minister Rishi Sunak, Minister of State for the Armed Forces James Heappey, and New Zealand soldiers stationed in the UK training Ukrainian forces. Prior to his departure for the UK, Hipkins called Ukrainian President Volodymyr Zelenskyy to reiterate New Zealand's support for Ukraine.

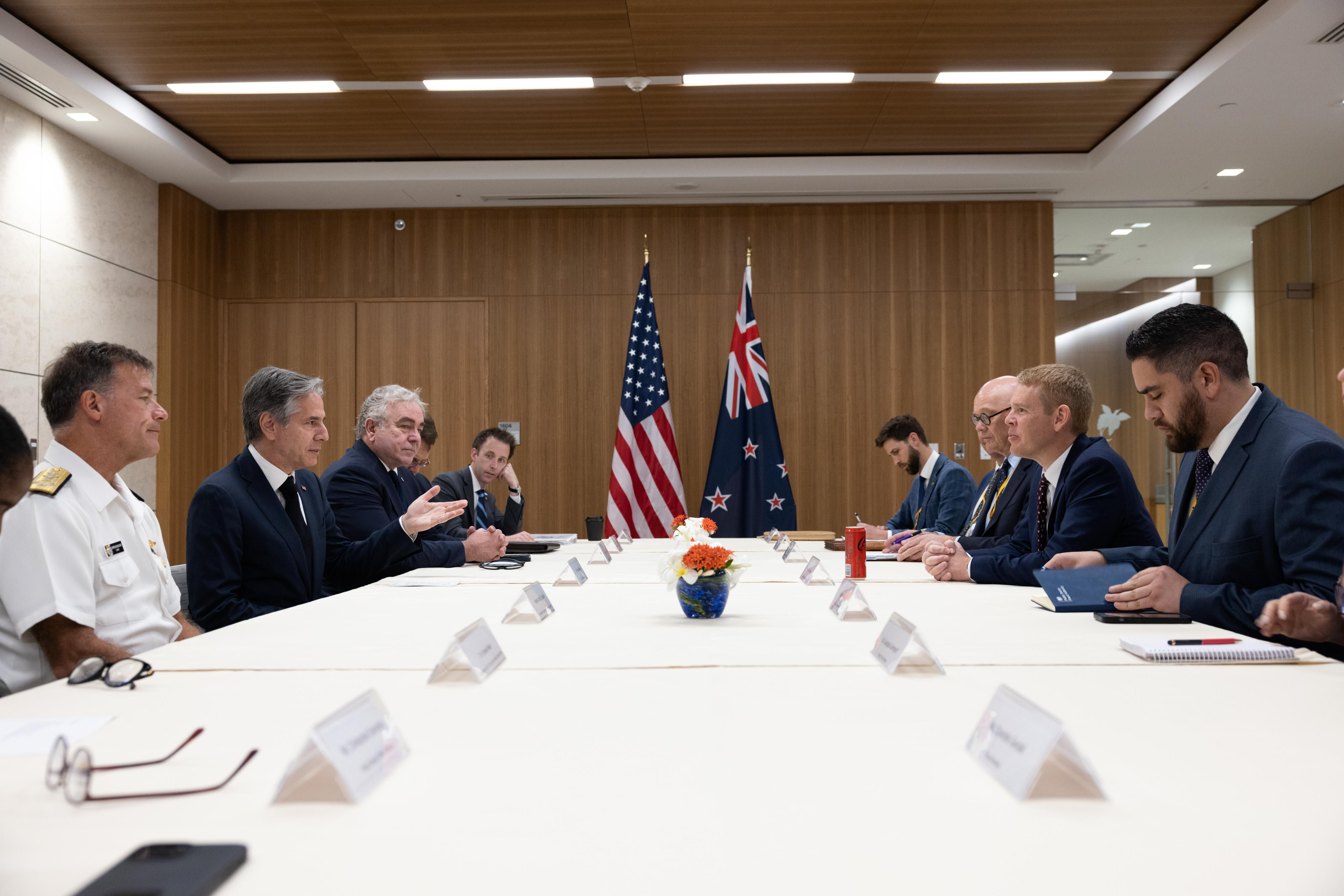
Hipkins meeting with United States Secretary of State Antony Blinken in Port Moresby in May 2023

On 22 May 2023, Hipkins visited Papua New Guinea where he met with several regional and international leaders including Papua New Guinean Prime Minister James Marape, Cook Islands Prime Minister Mark Brown, United States Secretary of State Antony Blinken, and Indian Prime Minister Narendra Modi. Hipkins's visit coincided with the signing of two bilateral defence and maritime agreements between the United States and Papua New Guinea. Hipkins voiced support for the strengthening of Papua New Guinea–United States relations and stated that the United States and New Zealand would work together on combating climate change and the "militarisation" of the South Pacific. He also stated that the United States acknowledged New Zealand's nuclear-free stance. On 23 May, Hipkins accepted an offer from Modi to visit India and discuss a proposed free trade agreement between India and New Zealand.

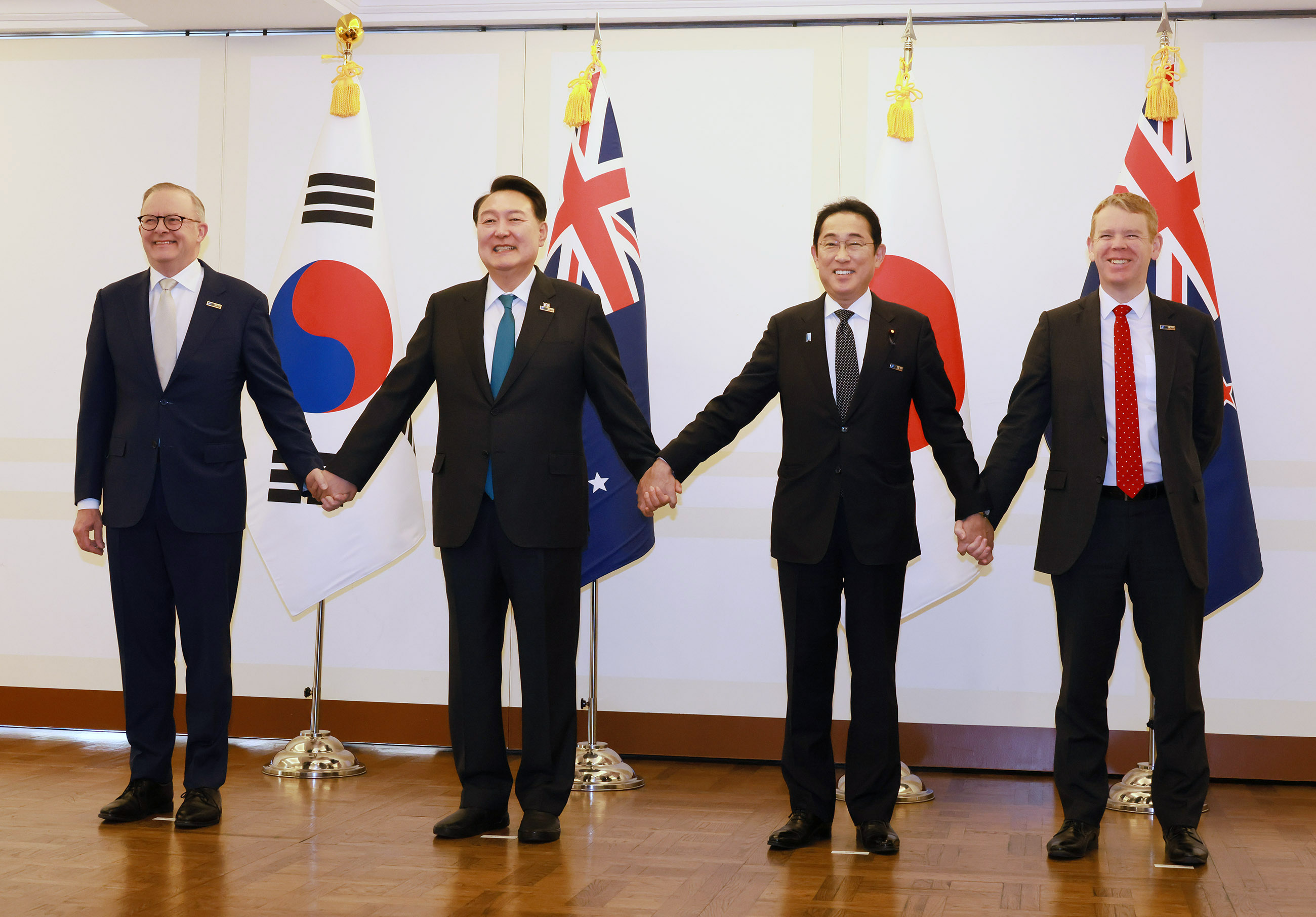
Hipkins at the 2023 Vilnius NATO summit

On 19 June, Radio New Zealand reported that Hipkins would lead a large political and business delegation to China to promote diplomatic and trade relations with China. Hipkins confirmed that he would meet Chinese President Xi Jinping during the state visit. Hipkins's delegation arrived in Beijing on 26 June where he was greeted by Chinese Vice Minister of Foreign Affairs Ma Zhaoxu. On 27 June, Hipkins met with Xi, with the two leaders emphasising the importance of friendly bilateral relations. They discussed China–New Zealand relations, China–United States relations, the Russian invasion of Ukraine, Pacific issues, and human rights. The Opposition criticised Hipkins for flying with a second jetliner as backup to as far as the Philippines in case the Royal New Zealand Air Force (RNZAF) Boeing 757 he rode were to experience mishap. According to the RNZAF, the precaution is not unusual. Delegations to other destinations in the past have become stranded after their plane broke down.

On 9 July, Hipkins and President of the European Commission Ursula von der Leyen signed the New Zealand-European free trade agreement in Brussels.

On 8 October 2023, Hipkins unequivocally condemned Hamas's actions during the Gaza war. He said that the targeting of civilians and hostage taking violated fundamental international humanitarian principles. He also said Israel had the right to defend itself. Hipkins's statement came after the Foreign Minister Nanaia Mahuta had issued a statement calling for the belligerents to halt violence, protect civilians, and uphold international humanitarian law. In response to criticism of Mahuta's remarks by ACT Party leader David Seymour, Hipkins denied that Mahuta was out of step with New Zealand foreign policy and stated that her remarks was a matter of timing. On 19 November 2023, Hipkins called for an immediate ceasefire in the Gaza Strip, saying "the violence and the killing has to stop".

=== 2023 general election ===
Hipkins led the Labour Party into the 2023 general election. During the election campaign, Hipkins ruled out introducing a capital gains tax if Labour was re-elected to Government. In July 2023, Labour introduced sweeping welfare initiatives as part of that year's budget, including a $1 billion Cyclone Recovery plan, a large increase in childcare and parental leave, scrapping prescription co-payments, free public transport for under-13s (and half price for under-25s), and increasing the funding for Te Matatini tenfold.

The results of the election on 14 October saw Labour lose its majority in Parliament; its share of seats dropped to 34, and its share of the party vote to 26.91%. Hipkins conceded the election to National Party leader Christopher Luxon on election night. Hipkins retained his Remutaka electorate seat by a margin of 8,859 votes.

== In Opposition (2023–present) ==
On 7 November, Labour's parliamentary caucus voted to retain Hipkins as party leader. The party's constitution required MPs to vote on the leadership within three months after an election, with leaders needing at least 60 percent plus one of the caucus. On 10 November, Hipkins and Luxon agreed to advise Governor-General Cindy Kiro to prolong the caretaker government arrangement due to lengthy coalition talks between National, ACT and New Zealand First. Hipkins continued to serve as caretaker prime minister until the formation of the National-led government. He stepped down and Luxon succeeded him on 27 November.

In addition to serving as leader of the Opposition, Hipkins also serves as spokesperson for ministerial services and national intelligence and security in the Labour shadow cabinet.

In September 2024, the Taxpayer Union-Curia Poll found that Hipkins had fallen by 6.1 points to 12.6% in the Preferred Prime Minister Poll while the Labour Party ranked 26.7%. In response to the poll, several senior Labour MPs including Kieran McAnulty, David Parker, Jan Tinetti and Willie Jackson expressed support for Hipkins's leadership of the party. In mid-September 2024, Hipkins attended a British Labour Party conference and met with members of the Starmer ministry. A Talbot Mills survey conducted in early September found that Hipkins ranked 22% in the Preferred Prime Minister Poll. In mid-October 2024, a 1News–Verian poll of 1,000 eligible voters found that 54% thought that he should remain as party leader, while 26% thought he should step down.

On 12 November 2024, Hipkins spoke at the National Apology to survivors of abuse in state and faith-based care alongside Luxon, and acknowledged the failings of successive governments towards abuse victims and survivors.

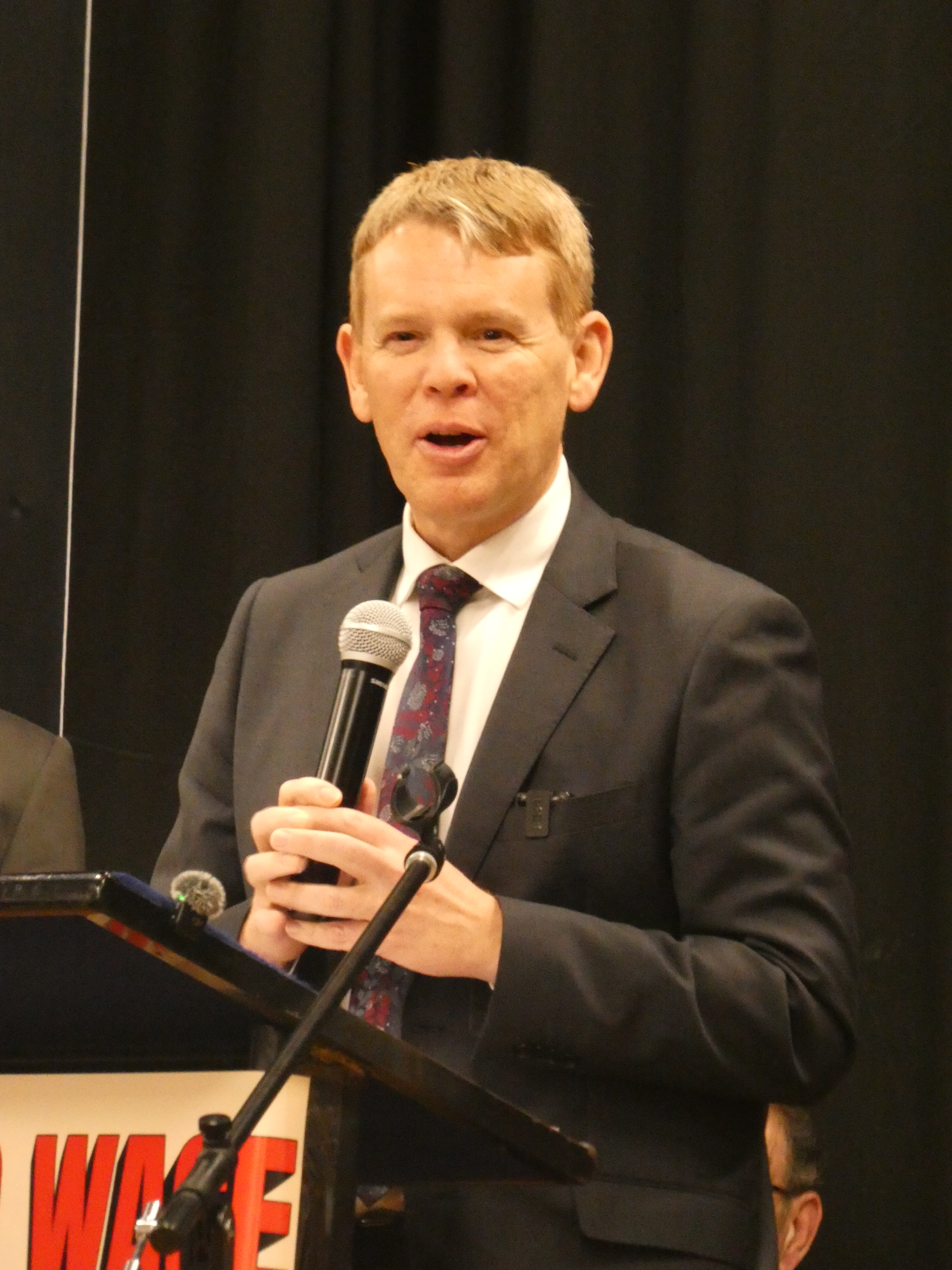
Hipkins at a Living Wage Movement function in Naenae, September 2026

Hipkins talking to students at the University of Otago, October 2026

On 7 March 2025, Hipkins announced a second cabinet reshuffle of his shadow cabinet during his State of the Nation speech at the Auckland Chamber of Business. He also announced the creation of a new economic team consisting of fellow MPs Barbara Edmonds, Ginny Andersen, Peeni Henare, Reuben Davidson and Cushla Tangaere-Manuel.

In mid-May 2025, Hipkins expressed disagreement with the Parliamentary Privileges Committee's recommendation that the Te Pāti Māori (TPM) MP Hana-Rawhiti Maipi-Clarke be suspended for seven days, and that TPM co-leaders Debbie Ngarewa-Packer and Rawiri Waititi be suspended for 21 days. During a parliamentary debate on the proposed suspension, Hipkins agreed that the three TPM MPs had broken the rules of Parliament but disagreed with the suspension, instead proposing that Waititi and Ngarewa-Packer be suspended from Parliament for 24 hours and that no further action be taken against Maipi-Clarke. Parliament subsequently adopted Leader of the House Chris Bishop's motion that the suspension debate be deferred until 5 June 2025, allowing the TPM MPs to participate in the upcoming debate around the 2025 New Zealand budget. On 5 June, Parliament voted along party lines to suspend the three Te Pāti Māori MPs.

In September 2025, Hipkins called the situation in Gaza a genocide and said that New Zealand should officially recognise it and speak out against it. In late October 2025, Hipkins announced that a future Labour government would introduce a 28% capital gains tax on property transactions excluding family homes and farms. The capital gains tax would be used to fund three doctors' visits a year. In addition, Hipkins said a future Labour Government would grant tax subsidies for the domestic video game industry.

In early March 2026, Hipkins described the joint US-Israeli airstrikes on Iran as a violation of international law and criticised Luxon and Foreign Minister Winston Peters for supporting the US and Israeli operations. He also condemned the killing of Iranian school children during an airstrike on a school.

In late March 2026, The New Zealand Herald reported that Hipkins had been briefed by the COVID-19 Vaccine Technical Advisory Group in March 2022 about the potential health risks of a second COVID-19 vaccine dose for children under the age of 18 years including myocarditis. The advisory group had recommended reducing the mandated vaccine dosage for 12 to 17 year olds from two to one jabs. Hipkins had initially denied receiving the Cabinet paper containing the advice but later said he had forgotten. Hipkins also denied allegations by New Zealand First leader Winston Peters that he had misled the Royal Commission of Inquiry into COVID-19 Lessons Learned about the Cabinet briefing.

On 23 April 2026, Hipkins confirmed that Labour would support the Government's free trade agreement with India, giving the National and ACT parties the numbers in Parliament needed to pass the agreement into law. National's coalition partner New Zealand First had opposed the agreement due to its concerns about immigration settings.

During the 2026 New Zealand general election, Hipkins was ranked first on the Labour Party list. He contested the Remutaka electorate. On 7 November, Hipkins retained the Remutaka electorate by a margin of 14,424 votes based on preliminary results.

== Political views ==
Hipkins is typically regarded as a centrist politician and pragmatic. A student activist at university, he has labelled himself as increasingly moderate due to deepening political polarisation. During his premiership he emphasised "bread and butter" issues, such as combatting the increased cost of living. Some observers see this as a push to retain or regain the support of the centrist swing voters who abandoned National in swathes for Labour in 2020.

Hipkins is not a monarchist, but ahead of the coronation of Charles III he announced that he would not be pushing for New Zealand to become a republic during his premiership. During a press conference, Hipkins stated: "Ideally, I think in time, New Zealand will become a fully independent country ... I don't think that swapping out the governor-general for some other form of head of state is necessarily an urgent priority right now, though."

In June 2024, Hipkins indicated that he was opened to amending legislation to change how MPs could claim housing allowances for their Wellington accommodation following media reports that several MPs were claiming housing allowances despite owning property in Wellington. In April 2026, Hipkins expressed support for means-testing superannuation applicants.

== Public image ==
Hipkins is nicknamed "Chippy", a diminutive name derived from his initials, but reflective of his "upbeat, slightly schoolboyish demeanour". He is known for his enjoyment of sausage rolls and Coke Zero. His love for sausage rolls has promoted discussion, with some political commentators claiming it embodies the sharp departure from the soft power New Zealand experienced under Ardern ("Jacindamania"). Hipkins has embraced his public perception, and is generally known as humble, affable, and self-deprecating.

== Personal life ==
Hipkins and his wife Jade were married in 2020 in a ceremony held at Premier House, Wellington, with Grant Robertson serving as best man. He has two children. He and his wife separated in 2022. When he took extended paternity leave for the birth of his second child in 2018, he was one of the first senior male cabinet ministers to do so.

By October 2023, Hipkins had begun a relationship with former staffer Toni Grace. The relationship was publicly revealed during his election night concession speech in October 2023. In mid November 2025, he confirmed that he was engaged to Grace.

New Zealand Parliament
Preceded by Paul Swain	Member of Parliament for Remutaka; 2008–present	Incumbent
Preceded by Simon Bridges	Leader of the House; 2017–2023	Succeeded by Grant Robertson
Political offices
Preceded by Nikki Kaye	Minister of Education; 2017–2023	Succeeded by Jan Tinetti
Preceded by Paula Bennett	Minister for the Public Service; 2017–2023	Succeeded by Andrew Little
Preceded by Poto Williams	Minister of Police; 2022–2023	Succeeded by Stuart Nash
New ministerial post	Minister for COVID-19 Response; 2020–2022	Succeeded by Ayesha Verrall
Preceded by David Clark	Minister of Health; 2020	Succeeded by Andrew Little
Preceded by Jacinda Ardern	Prime Minister of New Zealand; 2023	Succeeded by Christopher Luxon
Preceded by Christopher Luxon	Leader of the Opposition; 2023–present	Incumbent
Party political offices
Preceded by Rick Barker	Senior Whip of the Labour Party; 2011–2013; 2014–2016	Succeeded by Sue Moroney
Preceded by Sue Moroney	Senior Whip of the Labour Party; 2011–2013; 2014–2016	Succeeded by Kris Faafoi
Preceded by Jacinda Ardern	Leader of the Labour Party; 2023–present	Incumbent
