= NZAA =

NZAA may refer to:

- New Zealand Automobile Association, an incorporated society that offers various services to its members in New Zealand
- NZAA, the ICAO airport code for Auckland Airport, Auckland, New Zealand
