= 2023 New Zealand budget =

Government budget for fiscal year 2023/24

- Submitted by: Grant Robertson
- Presented: 18 May 2023
- Country: New Zealand
- Parliament: 53rd
- Party: Labour
- Website: Budget 2023

Budget 2023, titled "Support for today, Building for tomorrow", is the New Zealand budget for fiscal year 2023/24 presented to the House of Representatives by Finance Minister, Grant Robertson, on 18 May 2023 as the fifth budget presented by the Sixth Labour Government. The budget was released in the midst of rising living costs and recovery efforts following the 2023 Auckland Anniversary Weekend floods and Cyclone Gabrielle in January and February 2023.

== Background ==
On 11 May 2023, Finance Minister Grant Robertson stated that the 2023 budget would focus on four overarching themes: supporting New Zealanders with cost of living, delivering services that New Zealanders rely on, recovery and resilience, and "fiscal sustainability." Prime Minister Chris Hipkins stated that the budget would focus on easing cost of living pressures while making targeted investments to promote economic growth. The budget was released amidst rising living costs and inflation, and the economic and social devastation caused by the 2023 Auckland Anniversary Weekend floods and Cyclone Gabrielle between January and February 2023.

== Major announcements ==
=== Climate change ===
- Allocating NZ$1.9b from the Climate Emergency Response Fund on emissions reductions and adaptation measures.
- Investing NZ$120 million on expanding the national electric vehicle charging infrastructure.
- Investing NZ$300 million in Green Investment Finance.
- Creating a NZ$100m fund to help local councils invest in future flood resilience.
- Investing NZ$22.9 million to improve Westport's resilience against future flooding.
- Investing NZ $39.2 million to improve the mapping of New Zealand's coastline and identify coastal area vulnerable to climate change-related hazards and natural disasters.

=== Cost of living ===
- Spending NZ$1.2 billion to extend 20 free early childhood education hours to include two year olds.
- Spending NZ$618.6 million to scrap NZ$5 prescription fees.
- Spending NZ$327 million on free public transport for under-13 year olds, and permanent half-price fees for under-25 year olds.
- Investing NZ$402 million on expanding the Warmer Kiwi Homes scheme including subsiding heating, insulation, hot water heat pumps, and LED lamps.

=== Cyclone recovery ===
- Investing NZ$941 million to address flood and cyclone damage caused by the 2023 Auckland Anniversary Weekend floods and Cyclone Gabrielle in the North Island:
  - Allocating NZ$275 million to Waka Kotahi (New Zealand Transport Agency) and local councils to repairing damaged roads.
  - Allocating NZ$200 million to repairing railways.
  - Allocating NZ$117 million to repairing damaged schools.
  - Allocating NZ$35 million to various health services including mental health, general practitioners and frontline health workers.

=== Education ===
- Investing NZ$3.6 billion in extra operating expenses and NZ$1.3 billion in capital expenditure.
  - Allocating NZ$260 million to support early childhood centres' operating costs.
  - Allocating NZ$233.9 million to support school operating costs.
  - Allocating NZ$$521 million to support tertiary tuition and training subsidies.
  - Investing NZ$455.4 million into the National Education Growth Plan to build new schools and classrooms.
  - Investing NZ$134.4 million in Māori-medium schools and infrastructure.
  - Allocating NZ$198.7 million to the Christchurch School's Rebuild programme to support 33 projects.
  - Investing NZ$63.1 million to renovate 175 schools as part of the Ngā Iti Kahurangi school infrastructure programme.
  - Investing NZ$39.1 million in upgrading cybersecurity and information technology at schools and Kura Kaupapa Māori.
  - Investing NZ$23.6 million to boost teacher training enrolments and recruit overseas teachers, with the goal of recruiting 1,700 new teachers.

=== Health and disability ===
- Investing NZ$2.6 billion over the next two years to address cost pressures in the health system and reforms.
- Investing over NZ$1 billion to increase staff wages and numbers for the 2023–2024 financial year, including NZ$63 million to improving staffing levels and recruiting 500 new nurses.
- Investing NZ$864 million in the delivery of disability services.
- Allocating NZ$27.3m to end the minimum wage exemption, which allows disabled people to be paid at rates lower than the minimum wage.
- Investing NZ$20m to boost COVID-19 immunisation and screening coverage for Māori and Pasifika New Zealanders.
- Investing NZ$147m over the next two years to help schools support disabled students including automatic doors, lifts, and disabled access bathrooms.

=== Infrastructure and housing ===
- Investing NZ$6 billion to establish a "National Resilience Plan" and address the "Infrastructure Action Plan."
- Spending NZ$71 billion on new and existing infrastructural projects over the next five years.
- Allocating NZ$707 million in total operating expenditure and NZ$3.6 billion in total operating costs to address cost pressures in the public housing building programme.
- Investing NZ$3.1 billion to build 3,000 new public housing places by late June 2025.
- Investing NZ$100 million over the next five years in launching a new public infrastructure delivery agency called Rau Paenga.
- Allocating NZ$369.2 million to the Rail Network Improvement Programme for four years between 2023 and 2026. This includes funding a detailed business case for the electrification of the North Island Main Trunk.

== Responses ==
=== Treasury ===
In response, the New Zealand Treasury forecast that New Zealand would avoid a recession due to the rebuilding programme resulting from the Auckland floods and Cyclone Gabrielle. The Treasury also forecast that New Zealand's economy would not return to surplus for another year due to declining tax revenue and the Government's 2023 budget decisions.

=== Political ===
Prime Minister Chris Hipkins defended Finance Minister Grant Robertson's handling of the 2023 budget, arguing that it would help New Zealand avoid an inflation. He predicted that inflation would return to between 1–3 per cent by the end of 2024 and reiterated the Government's focus on preparing for future climate-related "extreme events."

The opposition National Party leader Christopher Luxon accused the government of "wasteful spending," labelling the 2023 budget "the blowout budget." National also criticised the budget's cost-of-living measures including free public transport, free early childhood education, and removing the $5 prescription medicines co-payment. Deputy leader Nicola Willis claimed that the budget would lead to higher inflation and mortgage payments. While she welcomed the Budget's early childhood education policy, she claimed that National's policy was better.

The budget received a mixed response from the Green Party. While the Greens welcomed several measures in the budget including public transport initiatives, and funding for early childhood education and warmer homes, Co-leader Marama Davidson criticised the budget for falling short on supporting people, addressing climate change, and implementing a wealth tax. Fellow Co-leader James Shaw welcomed the budget's NZ$1.4 billion on climate change mitigation and the expansion of the country's electric charger stations but opined that the budget could have done more on addressing climate change and child poverty.

ACT Party leader David Seymour stated that the Government was "running out of other people's money and excuses." While Seymour welcomed the Budget's infrastructure funding and medicinal support measures, he said that he did not support the Budget's increased overall spending and deficit, claiming that it would lead to a ten percent mortgage rates increase by the end of the year.

The budget also received a mixed response from Te Pāti Māori. Co-leader Debbie Ngarewa-Packer welcomed the funding boost to the Te Matatini kapahaka festival but said that the Budget still favoured the wealthy and failed to reduce the cost of food by removing the Goods and Services Tax.

The Opportunities Party criticised the 2023 budget for not addressing unfairness in New Zealand's taxation system, insufficient investment in young people, insufficient investment in the community housing sector, and the lack of long-term infrastructural investment plan.

=== Academics ===
Economist Shamubeel Eaqub welcomed the budget's emphasis on infrastructure, stating that New Zealand has an infrastructure deficit of NZ$210 billion.

=== Civil society groups ===
Greenpeace Aotearoa New Zealand spokesperson Christine Rose criticised the 2023 budget for allegedly emphasizing corporate profit over addressing climate change and the cost of living. By contrast, Federated Farmers criticised the Government for not investing in the farming sector and imposing "impractical, unpragmatic, and unfair regulations" on the farming sector in the midst of rising operating costs.

The New Zealand College of Midwives praised the increased health spending within the 2023 budget, particularly the five percent increase for midwives. The college called for a strategic approach to job retention for midwives.

The Free Fares campaign praised the Government's decision to introduce free public transportation for under-13 year olds and half-price fares for under-25 year olds. However, it criticised the Government's decision not to extend half-price fares to older age groups.
