= Plug-in electric vehicles in New Zealand =

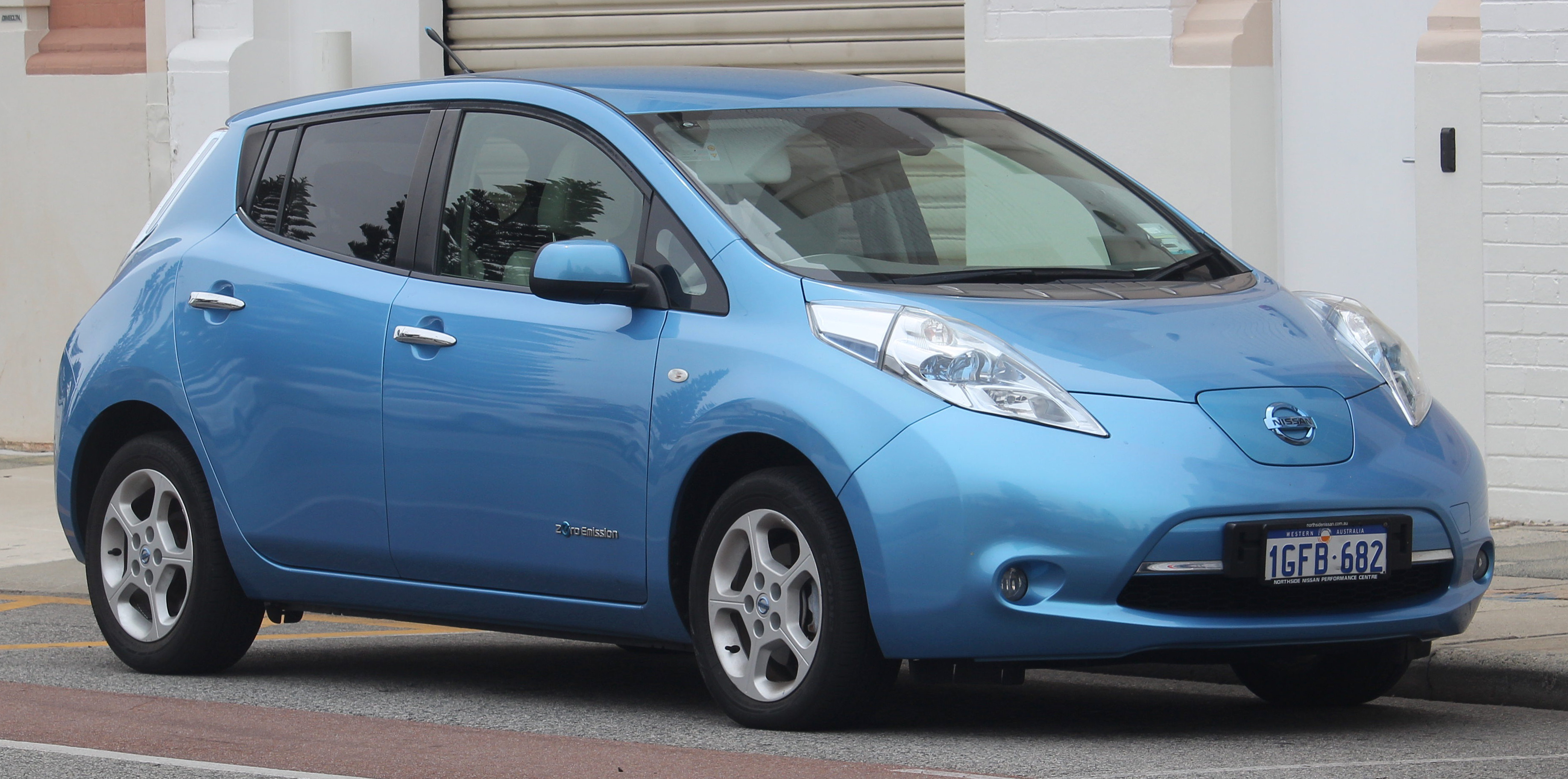
The Nissan Leaf is the most common electric vehicle on New Zealand roads

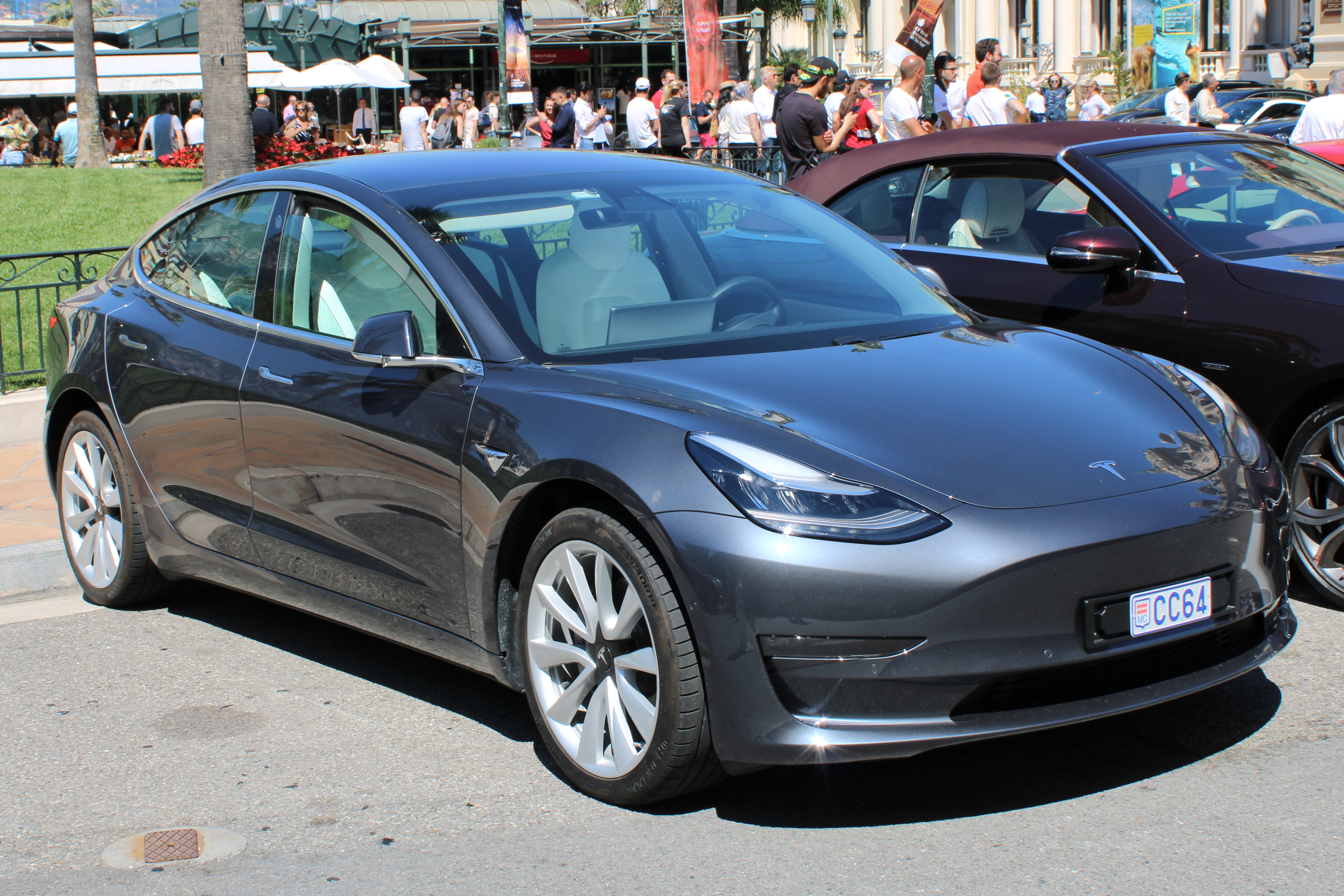
The most popular manufacturers of new electric vehicles in 2024 were Tesla, BYD and VW

The initial adoption of plug-in electric vehicles in New Zealand was supported by New Zealand Government policies, including monetary incentives such as electric vehicle discounts, exemptions from road user charges, and electric vehicle sales targets. By 2025 year-end, there were 135,348 registered plug-in electric vehicles in New Zealand, consisting of 92,540 battery-electric vehicles (BEV) and 42,808 plug-in hybrid vehicles (PHEV), together making up 2.8% of the national fleet of 4.9 million vehicles. In 2025, 11 percent of all new car registrations were plug-in electric vehicles.

== Government incentives ==
The National-led government launched an Electric Vehicle Programme in May 2016 to encourage EV uptake. Electric vehicles in New Zealand were exempt from road user charges (RUC) from 2009 until 1 April 2024; RUC now apply at NZD $76 per 1000 km unit for BEVs, and $38 per 1000 km for PHEVs. EV owners were initially able to access bus lanes and preferential parking, but this was dropped after local authority bus operators and the general public raised concerns about public transport disruption. There are subsidies available for the installation of public EV chargers. New Zealand also proposed a "cash for clunkers" scheme, incentivising low-income drivers to trade their petrol or diesel cars for a discounted electric vehicle, but this scheme was abandoned in March 2023.

In July 2019, the government proposed a Clean Car Discount of up to NZD $8,000 on purchases of new zero-emissions vehicles, and a charge of up to $3,000 for new vehicles that emit more than 250g of carbon dioxide per kilometre. The Clean Car Discount was in effect from July 2021 to December 2023, with a used EV being subsidised up to $3,450 and a used PHEV up to $2,300. This scheme was ended by the newly elected government on 31 December 2023.

In 2022 the Government enacted a Clean Car Standard that would phase-in a stepped reduction in the average emissions of most new and used imported passenger vehicles to 145 grams per kilometre travelled in 2023, dropping to 63.3g/km in 2027, with financial penalties if the targets are not met. These targets would ensure New Zealand cleans the entire car fleet by 2027 and both achieves and surpasses the European Union's fuel efficiency targets. As well as setting CO_{2} targets, the Clean Vehicles Act passed in February 2022 also imposed charges on the purchase of high CO_{2} emission cars, which will accelerate electric vehicle adoption.

In 2021 the government set a target for 50% of all light vehicle registrations by 2029 to be electric vehicles, and 100% by 2035. The New Zealand Government will ban the sale and importation of petrol and diesel vehicles between 2035 and 2040. This is despite the Climate Change Commission recommending banning petrol and diesel cars by 2032. Higher parking fees, congestion charges and road pricing were also considered to increase EV adoption.

== Charging infrastructure ==
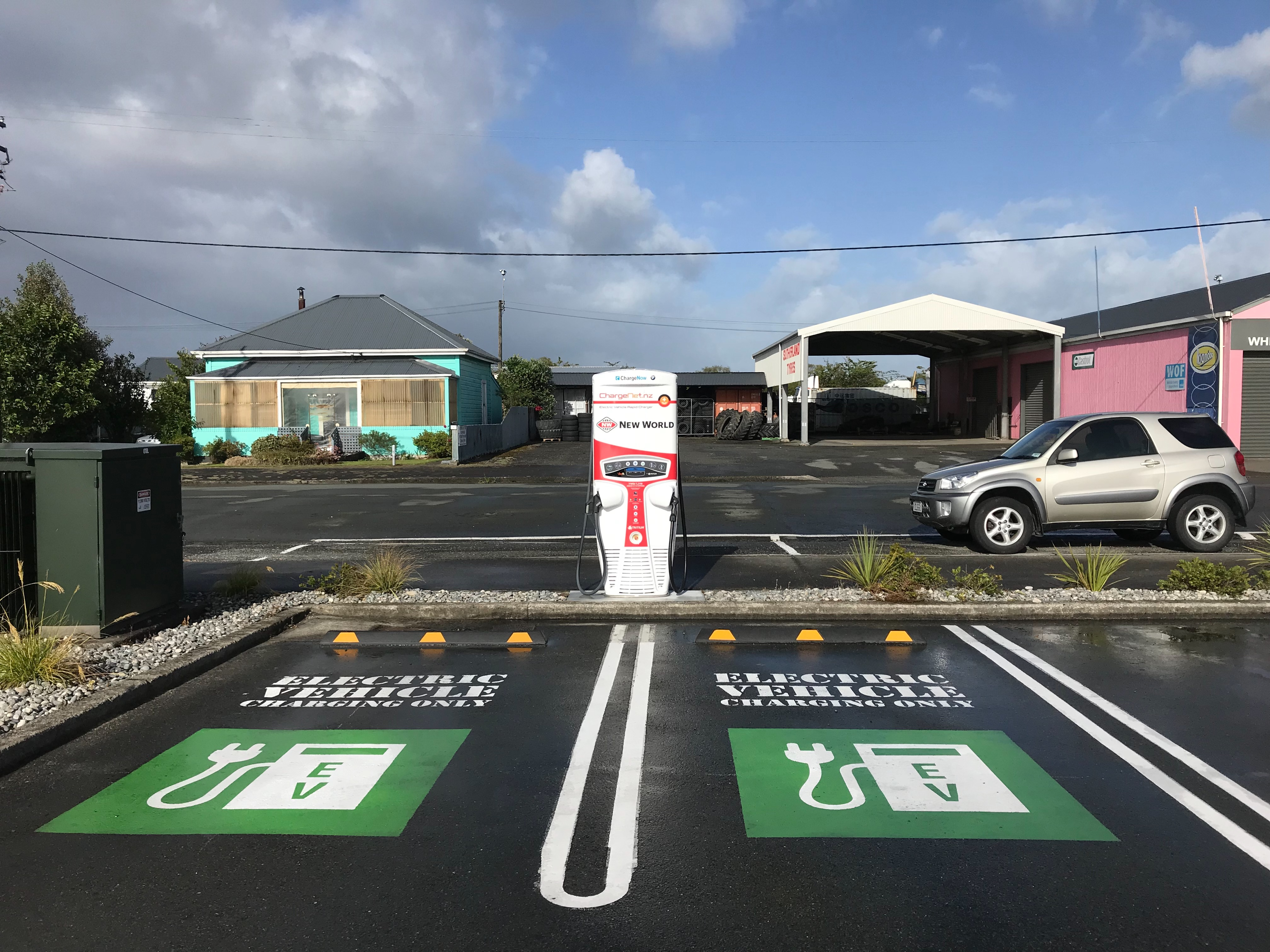
Charging station in Westport

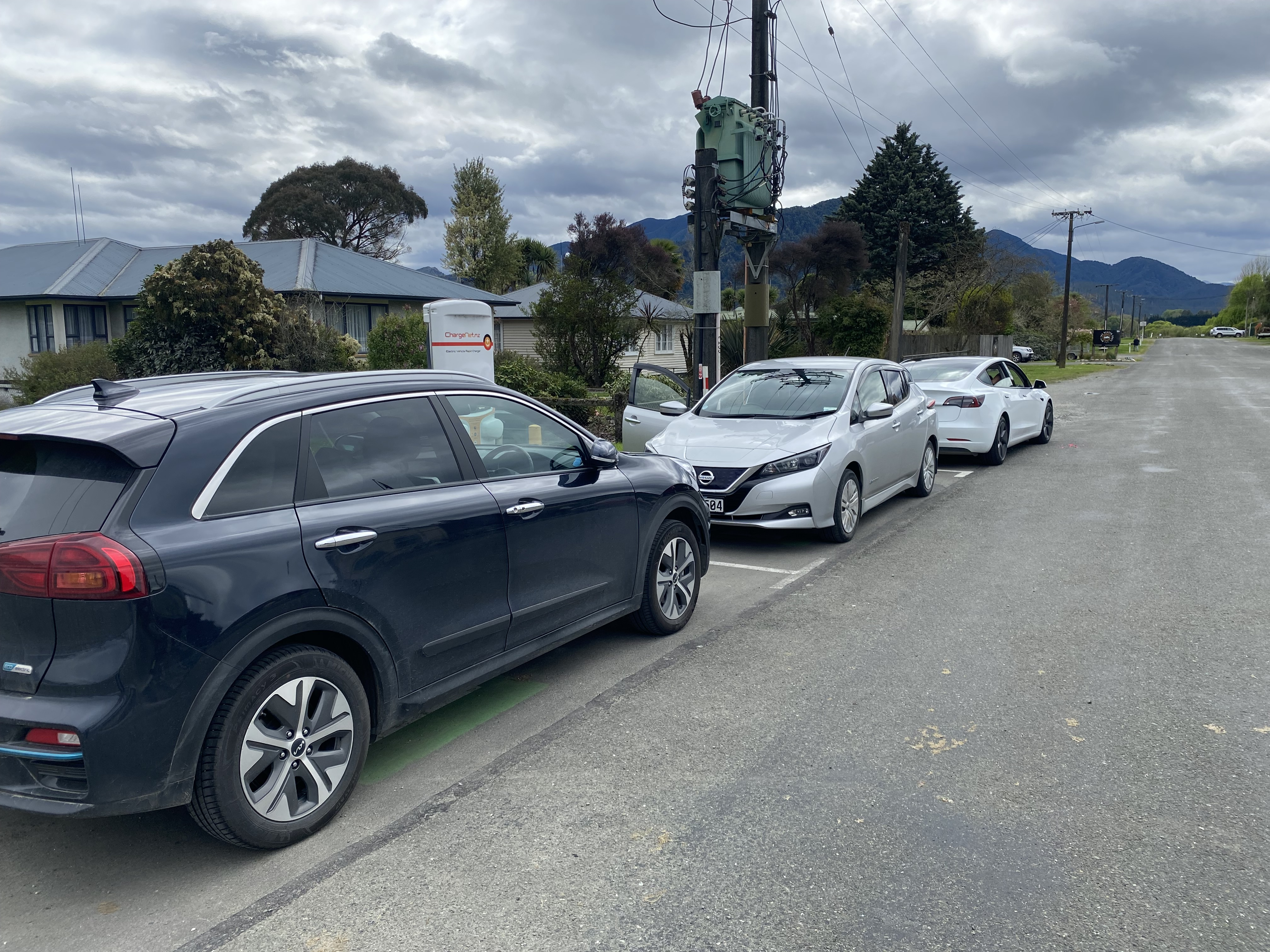
Queue at an EV charger in Murchison

As of June 2023, there are over 315 electric vehicle DC chargers across New Zealand at over 275 locations. Type 2 CCS and CHAdeMO are the standard connections for DC chargers in New Zealand; the former is mainly used by New Zealand-new vehicles while the latter is mainly used by used Japanese imports. As of December 2023, around 67% of registered battery electric vehicles use the Type 2 CCS standard, while 33% use the CHAdeMO standard.

In April 2017, Waka Kotahi NZ Transport Agency set a vision of at least one rapid DC charger every 75 km (47 mi) across the state highway network. As of June 2023, this is largely complete with some gaps in low-traffic and hard-to-reticulate areas: State Highway 43, State Highway 63, State Highway 7 over Lewis Pass, State Highway 6 over Haast Pass, and State Highway 94 to Milford Sound.

== Sales ==
By the end of 2023, New Zealand electric vehicle registrations reached 27.2% of new car sales. This was an increase from electric vehicles representing 6.45% of new car sales at the beginning of the clean car subsidy programme in July 2021.

While sales of new electric vehicles have increased, the New Zealand EV fleet is dominated by second-hand Nissan Leafs imported from Japan. In December 2023 there were 23,067 registered Leafs, accounting for about 30 percent of all BEVs on New Zealand roads. About 95 percent of these were imported second-hand from Japan, a similarly left-hand traffic country, and a major source for New Zealand's second-hand car market. Japan's comparatively slow adoption of EVs, the Leaf being the only notable contribution before 2020, has strongly shaped adoption of EVs in New Zealand. Cheap second-hand Leaf imports from Japan proved so popular that Nissan didn't offer the Leaf as a new vehicle in New Zealand between 2016 and 2019, citing price pressure from importers and second-hand dealers.

In 2020 there were more EVs in New Zealand than in Australia, despite Australia having five times the population. By July 2023, Australia had overtaken New Zealand with a total fleet of about 130,000 EVs. 26,000 EVs were registered in New Zealand in 2020, and the government planned to have an additional 60,000 electric vehicles on New Zealand roads by 2023. However, in 2019, New Zealand planned to have 64,000 electric vehicles in the country by 2021 when it was projected New Zealand would reach 100% electric vehicle sales by 2030. In 2021, New Zealand planned to lead Asia by targeting 30,000 EVs to be sold in 2025, and to have the highest EV market share of new car sales by 2029. A target was also set for the light vehicle fleet to be 30% electric by 2035.

== Statistics ==
EV fleet size in New Zealand
Type	2013	2014	2015	2016	2017	2018	2019	2020	2021	2022	2023	2024	2025
New PHEVs	11	224	451	779	1,199	1,939	2,880	3,640	6,114	13,393	22,407	25,806	32,751
New BEVs	100	139	206	581	1,263	2,004	3,861	5,412	12,177	28,099	53,004	59,563	67,065
Used PHEVs	0	2	15	116	456	897	1,544	2,222	3,292	5,219	8,430	9,441	10,057
Used BEVs	54	125	321	1,013	3,227	6,799	10,241	12,608	15,298	18,976	23,527	24,230	25,475
Total EVs	165	490	993	2,489	6,145	11,639	18,526	23,882	36,881	65,687	107,368	119,040	135,348
