= AA Insurance =

New Zealand insurance provider

- Type: Limited Liability Company
- Industry: Insurance
- Founded: 1994; 32 years ago
- Headquarters: Auckland, New Zealand
- Products: Car, Home, Contents Insurance
- Number of employees: 1000+
- Website: aainsurance.co.nz

AA Insurance is an independently operated, New Zealand-based joint venture between the New Zealand Automobile Association (NZAA) and Suncorp Group. The company offers home, contents, car insurance, and small business insurance.

== History ==
Launched in 1994, the company underwrites its own policies and sells direct to New Zealanders.

In 2021, AA Insurance was named New Zealand Insurance Industry Award Direct General Insurance Company of the Year for the seventh time.

In 2024 AA Insurance was ordered to pay a $6 million penalty for misleading practices and overcharging customers. The company improperly overcharged customers around $11 million. AA Insurance acknowledged its mistakes and issued a public apology.

In late December 2025, AA Insurance temporarily halted the issuing of new home, landlord and business insurance policies in the town of Westport due to the coastal town's high flood risk. In early February 2026, the company stopped issuing new home insurance policies in Woodend due to the town's earthquake risk.
