= New Zealand Automobile Association =

Incorporated society

The New Zealand Automobile Association (Incorporated)
- Formation: Auckland, New Zealand; 1903; 123 years ago
- Type: Incorporated society
- Purpose: AA Membership and mobility services
- Headquarters: He Ngākau, 22 Viaduct Harbour Avenue, Auckland, New Zealand
- Location: Auckland
- Region served: New Zealand
- Members: 1.7 million (as of 2020)
- Chief Executive: Nadine Tereora
- Website: aa.co.nz

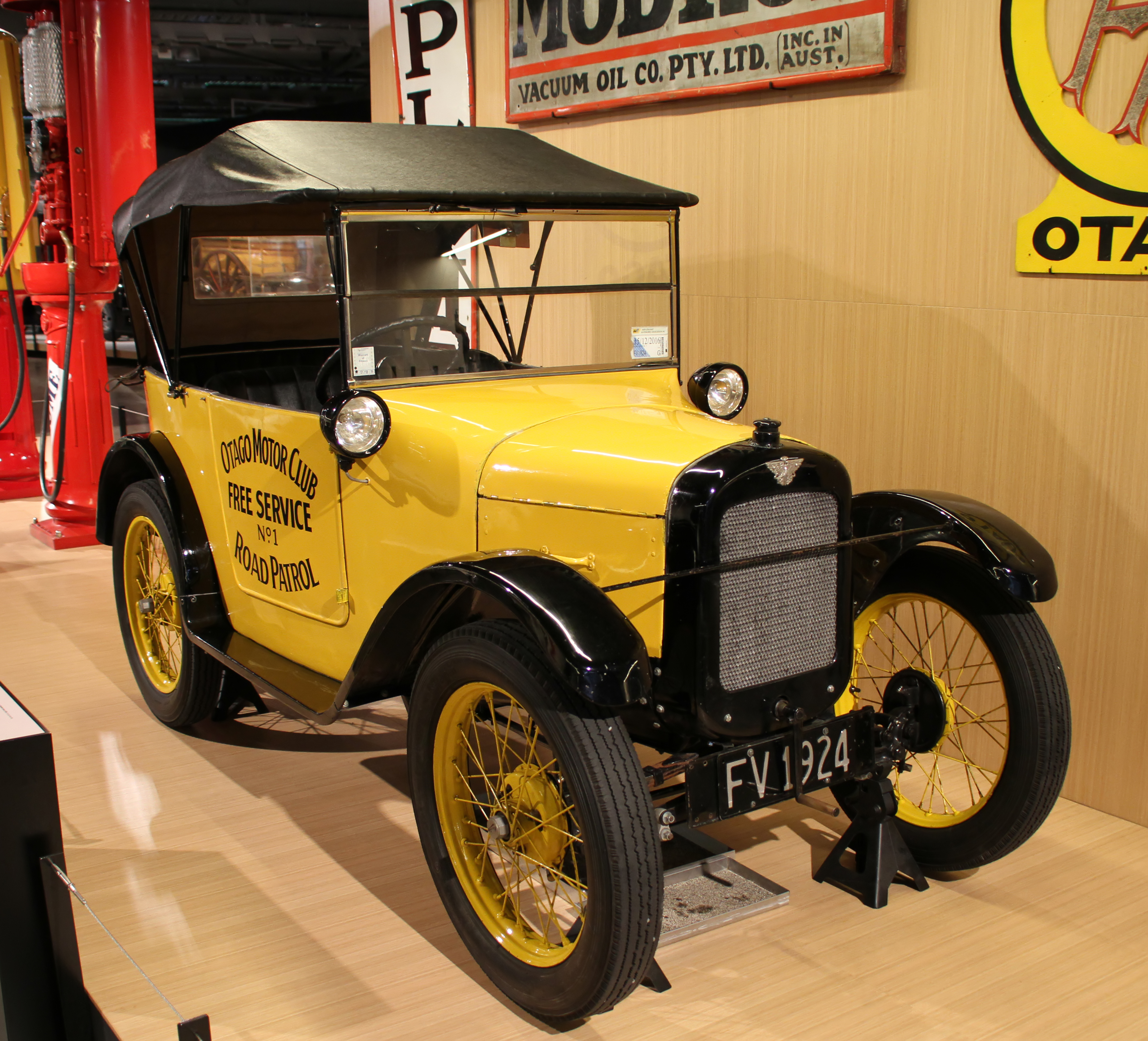
AA Otago 1924

The New Zealand Automobile Association (Incorporated) (NZAA or AA) is an incorporated society (non-profit organization) that offers various services to its members. These services include breakdown assistance, vehicle repairs, driver licensing, driver training, travel maps, accommodation guides and bookings, insurance, and finance.

Formed in 1903, the AA is the oldest and largest motoring club in the country. As of 2020, it has over 1.7 million members across New Zealand.

== History ==
In May 1903, Dr George Thomas Humphrey de Clive-Lowe invited about 20 new motoring enthusiasts to consider his idea to start an automobile club. First in Auckland, followed by Canterbury a few months later, motoring clubs began to dot the country with at least 15 different automobile associations registered by 1930. During the 1980s, 15 district automobile associations began to merge to form the New Zealand Automobile Association and became the country's largest club. The final merger was achieved in 1991 under the leadership of the former chief executive, Brian Gibbons. Products and services diversified through new joint venture companies, franchise operations and business partnerships during the 1990s.

== International affiliations ==
The AA is a member of the Fédération Internationale de l'Automobile (FIA) through which its members can receive reciprocal road services in a number of countries across the world.

== Products and services ==
- AA Roadservice provides 24/7 national breakdown and roadside assistance. The AA attends nearly half a million requests every year.
- AA Battery Service is a mobile battery service that can replace batteries on the spot in most areas.
- AA Auto Glass can assess windscreen chip and crack damage on the spot in most parts of New Zealand. It provides temporary side window replacements, chip repair, and windscreen replacement services.
- Motoring Services has a range of products and services including AA Auto Centres and AA Auto Service & Repair sites, AA Licensed Repairers, AA Vehicle Testing stations and nationwide Vehicle Inspection services. Vehicle history and vehicle valuation reports are also offered. The AA also shares car reviews, vehicle safety ratings and motoring advice.
- AA Motoring Affairs works with the government, industry and media to represent the interests of motorists and its members.
- AA Driver & Vehicle Licensing Agents enable members, motorists and customers throughout the country to access services such as membership joins and renewals, travel guides and maps, driver and vehicle licensing requirements, international driving permits, passport photos and Inland Revenue Department applications.
- Driver Education and Driver Training for both new learner drivers and also experienced motorists through a range of driving courses. The AA also has more than 100 driving instructors throughout the country.
- AA Traveller provides a wide range of travel services and free information available through AA Centres, agents and the website.
- AA Smartfuel was the AA's loyalty programme and enabled motorists to earn fuel discounts at accepting retailers such as BP or Caltex. The programme was discontinued on 31 January 2024.
- AA Insurance offers insurance options from car insurance to home and contents.
- AA Life Insurance offers a range of life insurance options including accidental death, term life and funeral cover.
- AA Health Insurance offers a range of private medical insurance.
- AA Pet Insurance offers comprehensive insurance for New Zealand pets.
- AA Travel Insurance offers travel insurance when travelling through New Zealand or abroad with a selection of plans
- AA Money provides financing for vehicle purchases including car, motorbike and boat loans, as well as leisure financing, business finance, savings and investment options.

The AA has District Councils throughout New Zealand that work “with police, local councils, and businesses” in various ways. For example, in 2026 one project that focused on youth safety--“the donated bike lights initiative”--gathered and distributed lights to thousands of South Island school children, along with "hi-vis straps for added visibility."

== See also ==
- The Automobile Association
