= Road Traffic Act =

Road Traffic Act may refer to

- Road Traffic Act 1930
- Road Traffic Act 1934
- Road Traffic Act 1988
- Road Traffic Act (Switzerland)

== See also ==
- Roads Act 1920
- Road Traffic Regulation Act 1984
