= RFL (disambiguation) =

The Rugby Football League is the governing body for rugby league football in England.

RFL may also refer to:

== Sport ==
- Riverina Football League, an Australian rules football league
- Riverland Football League, an Australian rules football league
- Regional Football League, a defunct American football league that operated in 1999

== Other ==
- Radio frequency lesioning, a medical procedure
- Rangpur Foundry Limited (PRAN-RFL Group), a Bangladeshi conglomerate
- Relay For Life, a community-based fundraising event for the American Cancer Society
- Restoring Family Links, services provided by the Red Cross and Red Crescent movement
- Road Fund Licence, a historical UK term for what is now Vehicle Excise Duty
- Robot Fighting League, an organization promoting robotic sports

See also

- List of filename extensions
- ROFL
