= Locomotive Acts =

UK highways legislation, 1861–1898

The Locomotive Acts were a series of Acts of Parliament in the United Kingdom regulating the use of mechanically propelled vehicles on public highways in Britain during the latter part of the 19th century. One of them, the Locomotives Act 1865, is known as the Red Flag Act.

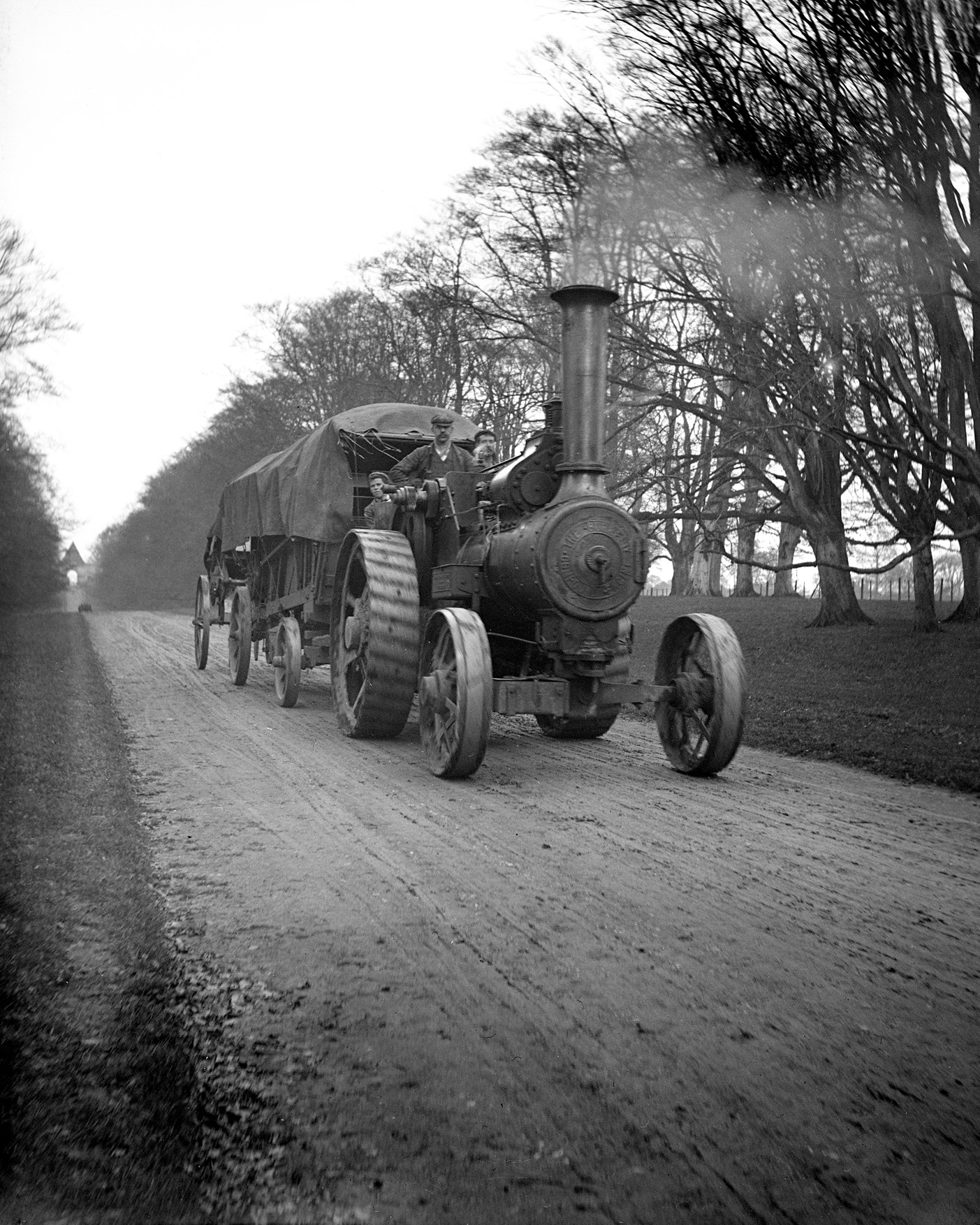
Road locomotive with waggons c.1900

The first three, the Locomotive Act 1861 (24 & 25 Vict. c. 70), the Locomotives Act 1865 (28 & 29 Vict. c. 83) and Highways and Locomotives (Amendment) Act 1878 (41 & 42 Vict. c. 77), regulated the use of locomotives and restricted their speed and operation. The second also reorganised the highway districts of the Highways Act 1835 as highway boards and vested in them former turnpike roads in their area and those which subsequently disturnpiked. The final act, the Locomotives Act 1898, required locomotives which were used on highways in a county to be licensed by that county and other locomotives (agricultural and steam rollers) to be registered. All locomotives were to carry plates showing their licence or registration.

The context for the legislation was the increasing adoption of steam power to mechanise agriculture. By 1860 the road steamers of the 1830s were a distant memory; a few private road steamers were being built but the vast bulk of steam-powered vehicles on roads were agricultural.

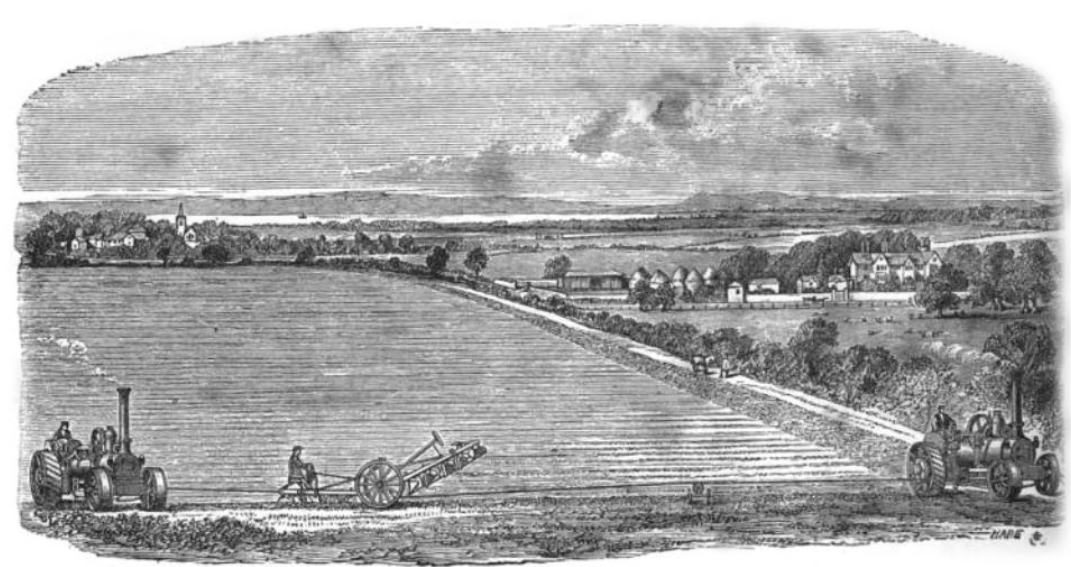
Steam ploughing c.1870

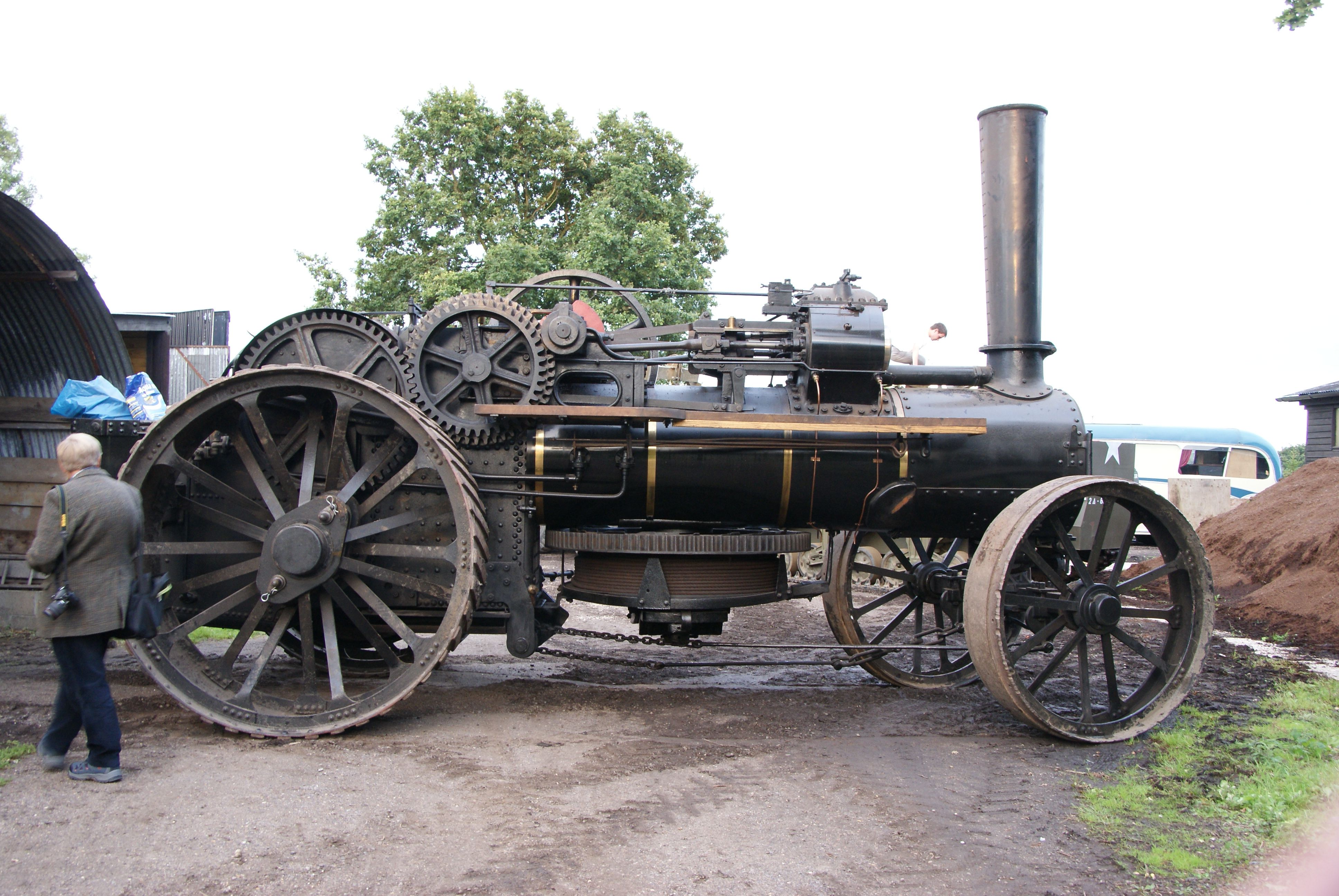
John Fowler Ploughing Engine

For instance, rather than horses or oxen ploughing a field, a steam ploughing engine (or two) could be placed in a field and draw a plough on a steel rope between them. Such ploughing engines were huge; they were also self-propelled (they moved slowly along the sides of the field to plough successive furrows). They made quick work of ploughing and did a better job than horses or oxen.

Contractors owned them and provided services to farmers, moving around the district on the roads. Legally, there was no problem if the contractors used horses to haul an agricultural engine on the roads from one farm to another. But this really didn't make sense as the engine could power itself (or be hauled by a steam traction engine). What the manufacturers of such engines, and the progressive agricultural interests wanted, was the right to run such steam-powered vehicles on the roads and an agreed system of tolls and rules for using them.

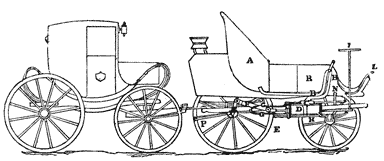
Side view of Gurney's steam drag of 1830 hauling a carriage. Exhaust emerged from a slit at the top left of A.

In the 1830s the builders of steam road vehicles had taken care to make them as inoffensive as possible: from the front, no chimney or moving parts were visible other than the wheels; coke was used to avoid smoke; noise was muffled by blowing steam into a box. When Goldsworthy Gurney built a small engine to tow a carriage, the exhaust emerged through a slit the full width of the engine. By the 1860s these lessons had been forgotten: traction engines had a prominent chimney with a rapidly spinning governor behind it; they used coal; and did not muffle their steam blasts. Engines were also large: up to 8 feet wide, as much as narrow lanes.

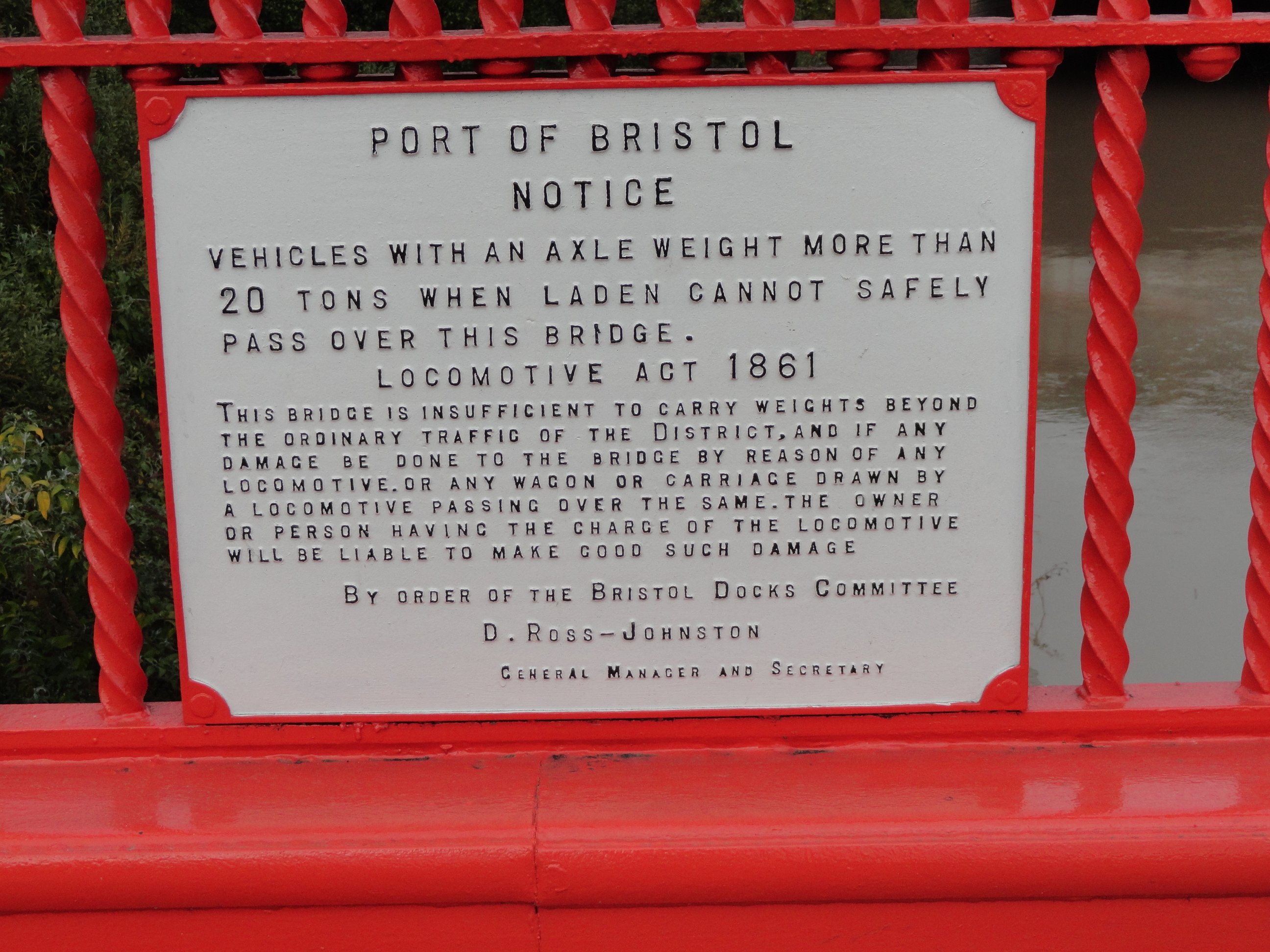
Notice citing Locomotive Act 1861 on Bath Bridge, Bristol

The Locomotive Act 1861 was the outcome of Parliamentary negotiations between the various interests concerned.. It regulated the use of locomotives (which in practice meant steam-powered traction and agricultural engines) on turnpikes and other public roads. It limited the maximum size and weight of locomotives and set the rates of toll which turnpikes could charge. Locomotives needed a crew of two (although not stated, these would have been the driver and the stoker), with a third man if there were more than two waggons.

Locomotives were subject to a speed limit of 5 mph in towns and 10 mph in the country. They were banned from suspension bridges and required consent to use other bridges on which notices had been placed that the bridge was only for the ordinary traffic of the district. All of these made sense in the context of the vehicles which the legislation was designed to regulate.

The Locomotives Act 1865 (the "Red Flag Act") imposed on road locomotives a speed limit of 2 mph in towns and 4 mph in the country. It increased the crew to three, of which one (in practice, usually a boy) was to walk 60 yards ahead carrying a red flag.

The Highways and Locomotives (Amendment) Act 1878 repealed the requirement for the pedestrian to carry a red flag, instead requiring him to walk at least twenty yards ahead to assist approaching horses and carriages. It retained the speed limits of the 1865 Act. County authorities could pass byelaws to regulate the use of locomotives on their roads and charge up to £10 a year license fee. Some exceeded their powers under the Act to pass byelaws requiring the red flag to be retained; West Sussex required a man carrying a red flag to follow the vehicle as well as one in front.

The Locomotives on Highways Act 1896 defined a new class of light locomotives weighing less than 3 tons, to which the 1861, 1865 and 1878 Locomotive Acts did not apply. This removed from such vehicles the requirement for a crew of three with one walking ahead, the speed limits and the bridge restrictions. It defined such vehicles as carriages and subject to the laws relating to them. It specified a speed limit of 14 mph with local authorities able to impose lower ones. This allowed the automotive industry in the United Kingdom to develop soon after the development of the first practical automobile (see History of the automobile).

While the Locomotives Act 1898 was nominally about regulating the weight of locomotives and waggons, section 6 allowed counties or boroughs with a population greater than 10,000 to pass byelaws restricting the use of highways by locomotives on their roads. Some authorities, notably in South Wales and Middlesex, used this to curtail the use of hundreds of roads by all locomotives.

== Background ==
The Highway Act 1835 (5 & 6 Will. 4. c. 50) and subsequent acts (Public Health Act 1875 (38 & 39 Vict. c. 55), Local Government Act 1888 (51 & 52 Vict. c. 41) and Local Government Act 1894(56 & 57 Vict. c. 73)) attempted to find satisfactory methods of maintaining roads since the UK turnpike trust system had failed following the UK railway boom.

New steam powered road locomotives, some up to 9 feet (2.7 m) wide and weighing 14 tons, were alleged to damage the highway while they were being propelled at "high speeds" of up to 10 miles per hour (16 km/h).

However, there is evidence that the steam carriages' brakes and their wide tyres caused less damage to the roads than horse-drawn carriages because of the absence of horses' hooves striking the road and wheels which did not lock and drag. It has been claimed that the restrictions in the earlier act were advocated by those with interests in the UK railway industry and horse-drawn carriages.

In addition to any concerns about the state of the roads, by the 1860s, there was concern that the widespread use of traction engines, such as road locomotives and agricultural engines, would endanger the safety of the public. It was feared that engines and their trailers might cause fatal accidents, scare horses, block narrow lanes, and disturb the locals by operating at night. Although all of these fears were justified and were soon realized, there was a gradual acceptance of the machines as they became more common in commerce.

Similar 'Red Flag' legislation was enacted in some states in the United States.

The emerging UK automotive industry advocated very effectively for the 1896 Act during the preceding year. Coventry manufacturer Harry J. Lawson, who had purchased the British Daimler engine patents in 1895 and later was to form The Daimler Motor Company, was very influential. Sir David Salomons, the founder of the Self-Propelled Traffic Association spent many hours advising Government officials as to what the law should be

== The Acts ==
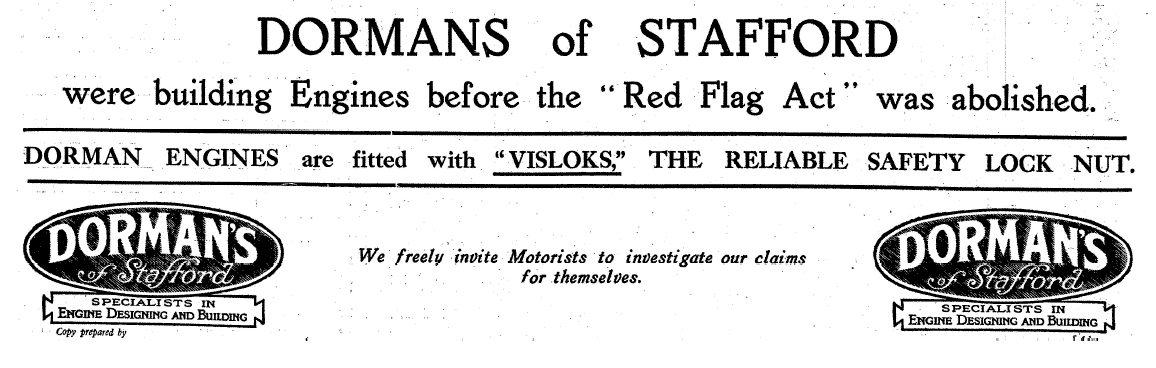
Dormans engines ad referring to the Red Flag Act (1919)

=== Locomotive Act 1861 ===
Locomotive Act 1861 (Note: Section 14.)
- Act of Parliament
- Parliament of the United Kingdom
- Long title: An Act for regulating the use of locomotives on turnpike and other roads, and the tolls to be levied on such locomotives and on the waggons and carriages drawn or propelled by the same.
- Citation: 24 & 25 Vict. c. 70
- Territorial extent: England and Wales; Scotland; (Note: Section 14.)

Dates
- Royal assent: 1 August 1861
- Commencement: 1 August 1861 (Note: Section 1.)
Other legislation
Amended by	Locomotives Act 1865; Locomotives Amendment (Scotland) Act 1878; Highways and Locomotives (Amendment) Act 1878; Statute Law Revision Act 1892; [; Road Traffic Act 1930; Local Government, Planning and Land Act 1980; Statute Law (Repeals) Act 1993; Dunham Bridge (Amendment) Act 1994; Statute Law (Repeals) Act 2004

Status: Amended

Text of statute as originally enacted

Text of the Locomotive Act 1861 as in force today (including any amendments) within the United Kingdom, from legislation.gov.uk.

An Act for regulating the use of locomotives on turnpike and other roads, and the tolls to be levied on such locomotives and on the waggons and carriages drawn or propelled by the same.

The Locomotives on Highways Act 1861 (24 & 25 Vict. c. 70) recognised that the use of "powered locomotives" on turnpikes and other roads would become commonplace, and that many existing laws (e.g. Turnpike, Highway acts) did not contain any provision for regulation or tolling of such vehicles. The act contained sections on:

- Toll fees of locomotives and their wagons: to be tolled at every 2 tons of vehicle weight, and equal to the respective tolls charged for horse-drawn vehicles. Vehicles with non-cylindrical wheels were to be charged 50% more. (Section 1)
- Regulations on the minimum width of wheels of vehicles over 3 tons: and on maximum loads per wheel, and restrictions on vehicles thought to be damaging to roads. (Sections 3, 4, 5)
- Regulations, restrictions, and procedures for compensation to trustees on the passage of locomotives over bridges and other structures for any damage caused thereon. (Section 7)
- Requirement for the vehicle to consume its own smoke (Section 8)
- Requirement for a road locomotive to be manned by at least two persons, with additional persons in charge of trains of wagons, as well as requirements for the vehicle to carry functional lights during night-time. (Section 9)
- A speed limit of 10 mph on open roads, or 5 mph in inhabited areas. (Section 11)
- Requirement for the owners name, and the weight of the vehicle to be clearly displayed on the vehicle. (Section 12)

The act also set out the values of fines for breach of the regulations.

=== Locomotives Act 1865 (Red Flag Act) ===
Locomotives Act 1865 (Note: Section 13.)
- Act of Parliament
- Parliament of the United Kingdom
- Long title: An Act for further regulating the use of Locomotives on Turnpike and other roads for Agricultural and other purposes.
- Citation: 28 & 29 Vict. c. 83
- Territorial extent: United Kingdom

Dates
- Royal assent: 5 July 1865
- Commencement: 1 September 1865
- Expired: 1 September 1867
- Repealed: 1 January 1931 (Note: The Road Traffic Act 1930 (Date of Commencement) Order (No. 2) 1930.)
Other legislation
Amends	Locomotive Act 1861
Amended by	Highways and Locomotives (Amendment) Act 1878; Locomotives Act 1898
Repealed by	Road Traffic Act 1930

Status: Repealed

Text of statute as originally enacted

An Act for further regulating the use of Locomotives on Turnpike and other roads for Agricultural and other purposes.

The Locomotive Act 1865 (28 & 29 Vict. c. 83):

- Stipulated that self-propelled vehicles should be accompanied by a crew of three; if the vehicle was attached to two or more vehicles an additional person was to accompany the vehicles; a man with a red flag was to walk at least 60 yd (55 m) ahead of each vehicle, who was also required to assist with the passage of horses and carriages. The vehicle was required to stop at the signal of the flagbearer. (Section 3)
  ... one of such Persons, while any Locomotive is in Motion, shall precede such Locomotive on Foot by not less than Sixty Yards, and shall carry a Red Flag constantly displayed, and shall warn the Riders and Drivers of Horses of the Approach of such Locomotives, and shall signal the Driver thereof when it shall be necessary to stop, and shall assist Horses, and Carriages drawn by Horses, passing the same.
- Additionally vehicles were required to have functional lights, and not sound whistles or blow off steam whilst on the road. (Section 3)
  ... the Whistle of such Locomotive shall not be sounded for any Purpose whatever; nor shall the Cylinder Taps be opened within Sight of any Person riding, driving, leading, or in charge of a Horse upon the Road ...
  ... any Person in charge of any such Locomotive shall provide Two efficient Lights to be affixed conspicuously, One at each Side on the Front of the same, between the Hours of One Hour after Sunset and One Hour before Sunrise.
- A speed limit of 4 mph (2 mph in towns) was imposed for road locomotives, with a fine of £10 for contravention. (Section 4)
  ... it shall not be lawful to drive any such Locomotive along any Turnpike Road or public Highway at a greater Speed than Four Miles an Hour, or through any City, Town, or Village at a greater Speed than Two Miles an Hour; and any Person acting contrary thereto shall for every such Offence, on summary Conviction thereof, forfeit any Sum not exceeding Ten Pounds.
- The restricted road locomotive vehicles to 14 tons, and 9 ft in width, as well as requiring the vehicle to have wheels meeting the requirements of the 1861 act. (Section 5)

=== Highways and Locomotives (Amendment) Act 1878 ===
Highways and Locomotives (Amendment) Act 1878 (Note: Section 1.)
- Act of Parliament
- Parliament of the United Kingdom
- Long title: An Act to amend the Law relating to Highways in England and the Acts relating to Locomotives on Roads; and for other purposes.
- Citation: 41 & 42 Vict. c. 77
- Territorial extent: England and Wales (Note: Section 2.)

Dates
- Royal assent: 16 August 1878
- Commencement: 16 August 1878 (Note: The Acts of Parliament (Commencement) Act 1793.)
- Repealed: 5 November 1993
Other legislation
Amends	Highway Act 1835; Locomotive Act 1861; Locomotive Act 1865; Highway Act 1862
Amended by	Statute Law Revision Act 1883; Summary Jurisdiction Act 1884; Local Government Act 1888; Locomotives Act 1898; Local Government Act 1933; Highways Act 1959; London Government Act 1963
Repealed by	Statute Law (Repeals) Act 1993

Status: Repealed

Text of statute as originally enacted

Revised text of statute as amended

An Act to amend the Law relating to Highways in England and the Acts relating to Locomotives on Roads; and for other purposes.

The Highways and Locomotives (Amendment) Act 1878 (41 & 42 Vict. c. 77) contained sections on:

- Arrangements regarding the formation of 'highway districts'; stipulating that they should roughly correspond with rural sanitary districts, and allowing the sanitary authority to apply to manage the highway districts, taking over property, debts and liabilities relating to the highway. (Part I. 3–12)
- De-turnpiked roads to become 'main roads' and half their maintenance cost paid through county rates. (Part I. 13)
- Gave the highway authority powers to request that roads between towns, and roads to railway stations be classified as 'main roads' (Part I. 15)
- Allow the county authority to contribute to the maintenance of bridges (Part I. 21–22)
- Provisions to recover maintenance costs from road users operating heavy traffic and causing excess road wear. (Part I. 23)
- Set out procedures for the highway authority to discontinue any unneeded roads. (Part I. 24)
- Allowing the repeal and issue of bylaws relating to animal-drawn vehicles that might cause damage to the road; as well as regulations on gates and regulations on bicycles, and allowing the issue of fines relating to such byelaws. (Part I. 26)

The act also repealed and replaced with amendments part of the 1861 and 1865 Locomotive Acts; these included:

- Section 3 of the 1861 act and section 5 of the Locomotive Act 1865 – clauses relating to the weight, length, and width of tyre of road locomotives (Part II. 28)
- Section 8 of the 1861 act, requiring road locomotives to consume their own smoke was repealed and amended. (Part II. 30–31)

=== Locomotives on Highways Act 1896 ===
The Locomotives on Highways Act 1896 introduced a 12 mph speed limit (8 to 16 mph at the local authority's discretion). Speed limits were later increased by the Motor Car Act 1903.

=== Locomotives Act 1898 ===
Locomotives Act 1898 (Note: Section 19.)
- Act of Parliament
- Parliament of the United Kingdom
- Long title: An Act to amend the Law with respect to the use of Locomotives on Highways, and with respect to extraordinary Traffic.
- Citation: 61 & 62 Vict. c. 29
- Territorial extent: England and Wales (Note: Section 20.)

Dates
- Royal assent: 2 August 1898
- Commencement: 1 January 1899 (Note: Section 21.)
- Repealed: 5 November 1993
Other legislation
Amends	Locomotive Act 1861; Locomotives Act 1865; Highways and Locomotives (Amendment) Act 1878
Amended by	Statute Law Revision Act 1908; Roads Act 1920; Road Traffic Act 1930; Local Government Act 1933; Statute Law Revision Act 1948; Road Traffic Act 1960; Statute Law (Repeals) Act 1975; Criminal Law Act 1977; Local Government, Planning and Land Act 1980
Repealed by	Statute Law (Repeals) Act 1993

Status: Repealed

Text of statute as originally enacted

Revised text of statute as amended

An Act to amend the Law with respect to the use of Locomotives on Highways, and with respect to extraordinary Traffic.

The Locomotives Act 1898 (61 & 62 Vict. c. 29) required road users to affix signs displaying the weight of wagons; limited length of hauled road trains to three wagons without permission, and gave powers to road authorities to operate weighing machines for the weighing of road vehicles, as well as allowing fines for the contravention of the regulations, and allowed for compensation relating to delay caused by the weighing process. (Sections 2, 3 and 4 respectively)

The act also contained sections on:

- Regulations relating to number of persons in attendance to road locomotives, assistance to passing horses or carriages, and the requirement for and proper form of illuminating lights (Section 5)
- Allowing councils to restrict the passage on road locomotives and their wagons on crowded highways, and bridges (in case of damage), whilst allowing bridge restrictions to be lifted on the payment of costs relating to bridge strengthening (Section 6)
- Gave the right of appeal to road locomotives operators on restrictions under the act of the 1861 act. (Section 7)
- Restricted passing of locomotives on bridges (Section 8)
- Required road locomotives used for haulage (excluding agricultural machines, and steam rollers) to be licensed by the county council, and set out the requirement for display of a license plate (Sections 9, 10, 11)

== See also ==
- Speed limit enforcement
- United Kingdom enterprise law
