= Locomotives on Highways Act 1896 =

Act of the Parliament of the United Kingdom to reform the speed limit

Locomotives on Highways Act 1896 (Note: Section 12.)
- Act of Parliament
- Parliament of the United Kingdom
- Long title: An Act to amend the Law with respect to the Use of Locomotives on Highways.
- Citation: 59 & 60 Vict. c. 36
- Territorial extent: United Kingdom

Dates
- Royal assent: 14 August 1896
- Commencement: 14 November 1896
- Repealed: 1 January 1931 (Note: The Road Traffic Act 1930 (Date of Commencement) Order (No. 2) 1930.)
Other legislation
Amended by	Petroleum (Amendment) Act 1928
Repealed by	Road Traffic Act 1930

Status: Repealed

Text of statute as originally enacted

The Locomotives on Highways Act 1896 (59 & 60 Vict. c. 36) was an act of the Parliament of the United Kingdom that reclassified motor vehicles weighing less than three tons unladen as light locomotives, thereby freeing them from the restrictions applied by the Locomotive Acts. These had been introduced from 1861 onwards to regulate the heavy steam-powered traction engines which had been the only motorised vehicles on the roads.

The development of light motor vehicles, particularly in France and Germany in the 1880s and early 1890s led to pressure in the UK to lift restrictions which hindered the development of a UK motor industry. Apart from those with financial interests, Sir David Salomons, Mayor of Tunbridge Wells, played a key role advising Government officials how the law should be changed.

A bill was about to be introduced in the House of Commons when Gladstone's Administration fell in 1895 and the Bill was then introduced and passed by the Conservative Administration of Lord Salisbury. It came into operation on 14 November 1896.

== Background ==
The powerful railways lobby and those with interests in transport using horse-drawn vehicles (Note: "About seventy years ago, at the time of the introduction of railways, there were scores of steam coaches and steam carriages running on our roads. The pioneers of this industry were Hancock, Gurney, Summers, and others, many of whose names are lost at the present day. But the opposition of the Turnpike Trustees, the coach proprietors, and the railway companies nipped in the bud a promising industry by the imposition of excessive tolls and adverse Acts of Parliament.") advocated the original Locomotive Acts which imposed very low speed limits and other restrictions on the use of "locomotives" and motorcars on the UK public highways.

Motor car enthusiasts strongly urged the removal of these restrictions on motorcars. (Note: "Among the names of those who pushed forward the movement may be mentioned Sir David Salomons, the Hon. Evelyn Ellis, Colonel Holden, Messrs. Shaw Lefevre, C. S. Rolls, F. R. Simms, and H. Sturmey.") The Mayor of Tunbridge Wells, Sir David Salomons, organized the first automobile exhibition to be held on 15 October 1895 in his local agricultural society's showgrounds. On the day the ground was too soft so he led the vehicles out onto the road from the showground to the town. "Not one of the horses so much as lifted an eye as the horseless carriages sped somewhat noisily by".

The enthusiasts included London company-promoter turned motor-industry promoter H. J. Lawson, who in July 1895 successfully floated his British Motor Syndicate Ltd and in 1896 formed the Daimler Motor Company Ltd to buy F. J. Simms' Syndicate. F. J. Simms had already formed his Self Propelled Traffic Association in 1895, then followed it in 1897 with a motorist's club now known as the Royal Automobile Club (RAC). Henry Sturmey of publishers Iliffe & Sturmey edited it himself, and also started The Autocar in November 1895 to tell of the burgeoning motor industry in France, attract the support of the public and publicize their promotion events.

The day before the flotation of the Daimler Motor Company Ltd and Lawson's promotional gathering of almost 1,700 people on 15 February 1896, the Prince of Wales, later King Edward VII, was driven about the location, the Imperial Institute, by Simms' friend, Evelyn Ellis, in the Daimler-engined Panhard & Levassor which Ellis and Simms had brought in from France and used in July 1895 for Britain's first long-distance motorcar journey – Southampton to Datchet and on to Malvern without police intervention. The Prince said "Evelyn, don't drive so fast, I am frightened!" as too were the bystanders, but he was impressed and later agreed to become patron of Britain's first motor show. "Ellis subsequently ran the car in many parts of England doing what he could to induce the authorities to take proceedings against him ... but the authorities did not accept his challenge".

By 1895 some drivers of early lightweight steam-powered autocars thought that these would be legally classed as a horseless carriage and would therefore be exempt from the need for a preceding pedestrian. John Henry Knight brought a test case to court in 1895. On 17 October 1895 Knight's assistant, James Pullinger, was stopped in Castle Street, Farnham, by the Superintendent of Police and a crowd had gathered by the time Knight arrived. The superintendent asked whether it was a steam engine, Knight replied that it was not and thus admitted liability. He and Pullinger were charged with using a locomotive without a licence. The case was heard at Farnham court of petty sessions in Farnham Town Hall on 31 October 1895. Knight and Pullinger were both fined half a crown, 2s 6d (or possibly 5 shillings) plus 10 shillings costs (or possibly 12s 6d). (Note: "In the same year, 1895, I made my little petrol car to carry two (one besides the driver). It weighed a little under 5 cwt., but the engine did not develop much more than 1 h.p. It was fairly successful, but it brought me into the clutches of the law, and both my man, who was driving at the time, and myself were fined 2s. 6d. and costs for driving a locomotive (in legal phraseology a traction engine) without a licence and without a red flag!")

Parliament first debated the Locomotives on the Highway Bill in 1895 but the bill lapsed when Gladstone's minority Liberal government fell that year. Following the 1895 general election a new parliament, formed by the Conservative and Liberal Unionist parties, debated the proposal again, and the act was passed, taking effect on 14 November 1896.

During the debate for the bill, various speeds between 10 and 14 mph (16 and 23 km/h) were discussed with reference to the speed of a horse and what would be deemed to be 'furious driving' in relation to a horse.

== Clauses ==
The act defined a new category of vehicle, light locomotives, which were vehicles under 3 tons unladen weight. These 'light locomotives' were exempt from the three crew member rule, and were subject to the higher 14 mph (23 km/h) speed limit although most local authorities had the authority to reduce it to 12 mph (19 km/h).

== Subsequent developments ==
In celebration of the act being passed Lawson organised an Emancipation Run, which took place on 14 November 1896 when thirty vehicles travelled from London to Brighton. Annual commemoration of that emancipation day drive became famous and is known as the London to Brighton Veteran Car Run. The relaxation of usage restrictions eased the way for the development of the British motor industry.

The speed limit was raised to 20 mph (32 km/h) by the Motor Car Act 1903 (3 Edw. 7. c. 36). Both the 1896 act and the 1903 act were repealed by section 122 of, and the fifth schedule to, the Road Traffic Act 1930 (20 & 21 Geo. 5. c. 43).

== See also ==
- Roads Act 1920
- Road Traffic Act 1934
- Road speed limits in the United Kingdom

== Bibliography ==
- Locomotives Act, 1861 Pratt's Law of Highways Edition 10, Shaw & Sons (1865) p. 388
