= Red flag traffic laws =

Historic automobile approach announcement laws

Red flag laws were laws in the United Kingdom and the United States enacted in the late 19th century, requiring drivers of early automobiles to take certain safety precautions, including waving a red flag in front of the vehicle as a warning.

== Red flag law in the United Kingdom ==
In the United Kingdom, the law required self-propelled vehicles to be led by a pedestrian waving a red flag or carrying a lantern to warn bystanders of the vehicle's approach.

In particular the Locomotives Act 1865, also known as Red Flag Act, stated:

Firstly, at least three persons shall be employed to drive or conduct such locomotive, and if more than two waggons or carriages he attached thereto, an additional person shall be employed, who shall take charge of such waggons or carriages;
Secondly, one of such persons, while any locomotive is in motion, shall precede such locomotive on foot by not less than sixty yards, and shall carry a red flag constantly displayed, and shall warn the riders and drivers of horses of the approach of such locomotives, and shall signal the driver thereof when it shall be necessary to stop, and shall assist horses, and carriages drawn by horses, passing the same.

The Red Flag Act was repealed in 1896, by which time the internal combustion engine was well into its infancy.

== Red flag law in the United States ==
In the United States, Vermont passed a similar Red Flag Law in 1894, only to repeal it two years later. This law stated that "[t]he owner or person in charge of a carriage, vehicle or engine propelled by steam, except road rollers" must have a "person of mature age [...] at least one-eight of a mile in advance of" the vehicle, to warn those with livestock of its impending arrival. If at night, it also required the aforementioned person to carry a red light. The law did not apply to rail vehicles.
