= Hill v Baxter =

UK legal case

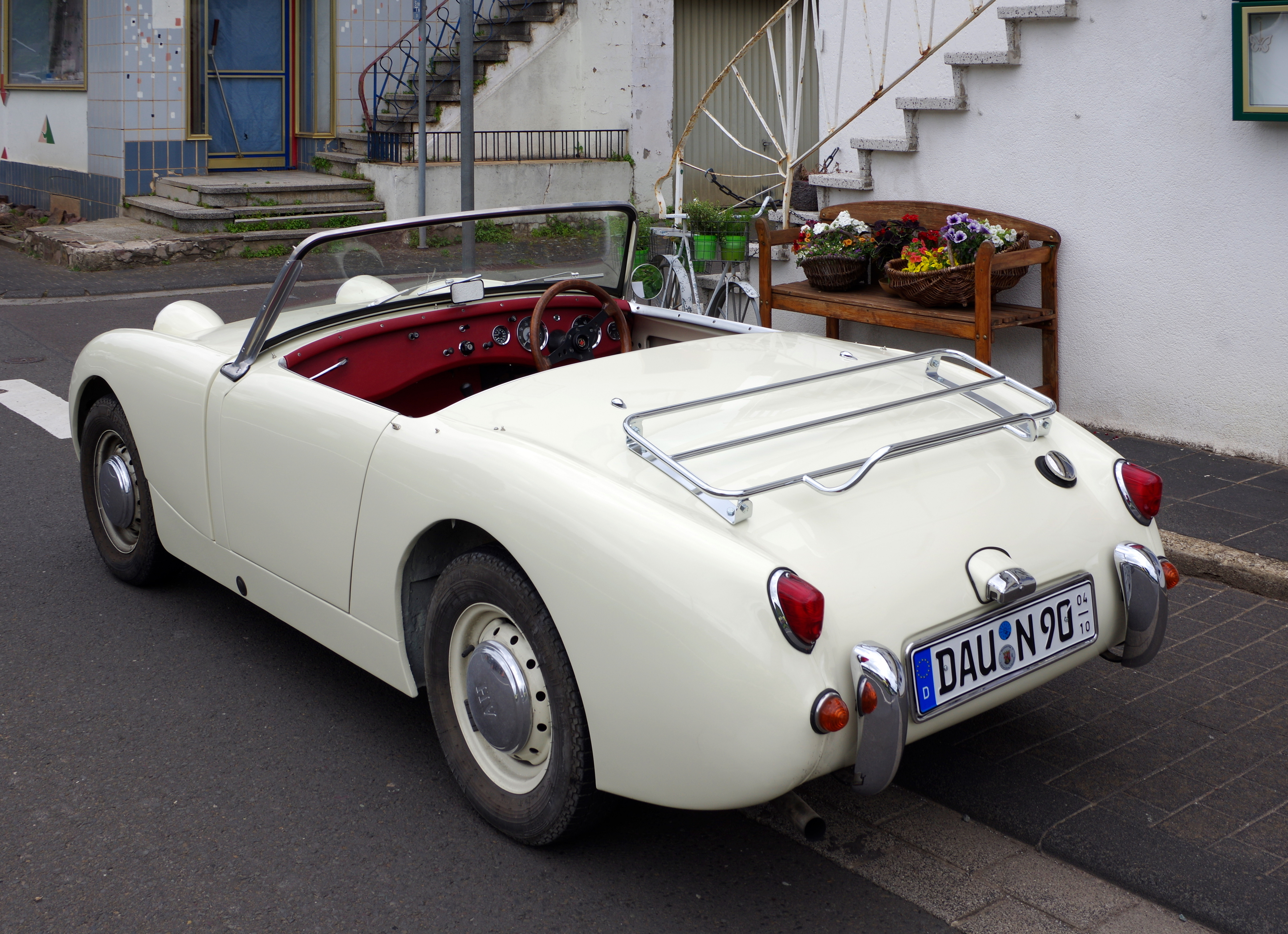
- Court: Queen's Bench Division (Divisional Court)
- Full case name: Thomas Richard Hill (Prosecutor) v Kenneth Baxter
- Decided: 5, 6 and 19 December 1957
- Citation: all being 1958: 1 Q.B. 277; 2 W.L.R. 76; 1 All E.R. 193; 61 T.L.R. 452; 42 Cr. App. R. 51; 122 J.P. 134; 56 L.G.R. 117; 102 S.J. 53
- Cases cited: Kay v Butterworth
- Legislation cited: Road Traffic Act 1930, Criminal Justice Act 1948

Case history
- Prior action: None
- Subsequent action: None

Court membership
- Judges sitting: Lord Goddard CJ, Pearson J, Devlin J

Keywords
- Automatism

The case of Hill v Baxter concerns the issue of automatism in driving in England and Wales without a diagnosed condition. It sets out guidelines as to when the defence will apply, and when it will not and what jury instructions ("directions to the jury" or considerations by the magistrates) should be given to leave the defence open for them to find or deny, given appropriate medical evidence and the extent of wrongfulness involved in allowing the automatism to occur in many circumstances.

== Facts ==
A man succeeded in driving a great distance somewhat part-conscious before having an accident. He was charged with dangerous driving. He could not remember anything between a very early point of the journey and immediately after the accident. It was suggested (and accepted at first instance) that he was not fully conscious of what he was doing, and "that he was not capable of forming any intention as to his manner of driving." The reason for this is because he had an unknown illness, and so was not able to control his actions.

== Automatism ==
As dangerous driving under the Road Traffic Act 1930 was an offence of strict liability, lack of mens rea would not be enough to exculpate him. He was instead hoping to rely on the defence of automatism, a narrow category of its own class distinct from insanity. Lord Goddard CJ ruled sometimes "the driver would be in such a state of unconsciousness that he could not be said to be driving." This is in effect a denial of actus reus. However, he found that the accused had simply fallen part-asleep. As this was something he had substantial control over, being presumed to have been aware that he was tired, he found that he was reckless in continuing to drive, he then quoted Humphreys J in Kay v Butterworth (1945) and resurrected the now-famous analogy of a swarm of bees attacking the driver, in which case the driver would not have been held liable.

Pearson J. agreed on all relevant points of law, but disagreed as to why he should be convicted. He held that as the man had driven a substantial distance without incident nor any recollection, he was clearly "driving with skill", and therefore must have been driving.

The panel held that the jury or magistrates should be advised only a voluntary act or omission can qualify as an actus reus, however driving a substantial distance during the time of alleged transience of mind or consciousness would tend towards a finding of fact of some form of voluntary act, even if simply ignoring the signs of tiredness so being unfit to drive.

== Outcome ==
The prosecution's appeal was allowed, for a retrial whereby the magistrates could have a fuller understanding of the law. The defendant was then found guilty.

== Considered by ==
The case was applied in R v Evans (Frankis) [1963] 1 QB 412.
