= Road Traffic Act 1934 =

Act of the Parliament of the United Kingdom

Road Traffic Act 1934 (Note: Section 42(1).)
- Act of Parliament
- Parliament of the United Kingdom
- Long title: An Act to amend the Road Traffic Act, 1930, and section thirty-four of the Road and Rail Traffic Act, 1933, and for purposes incidental thereto.
- Citation: 24 & 25 Geo. 5. c. 50
- Territorial extent: England and Wales; Scotland; (Note: Section 42(4).)

Dates
- Royal assent: 31 July 1934
- Commencement: various (Note: Section 42(3).)
- Repealed: 16 November 1989
Other legislation
Amends	Road Traffic Act 1930; Road and Rail Traffic Act 1933
Amended by	Road Transport Lighting Act 1957; Highways Act 1959; Statute Law Revision Act 1959; Road Traffic Act 1960; Statute Law (Repeals) Act 1976
Repealed by	Statute Law (Repeals) Act 1989

Status: Repealed

Text of statute as originally enacted

The Road Traffic Act 1934 (24 & 25 Geo. 5. c. 50) was an act of the Parliament of the United Kingdom introduced by the Minister of Transport, Leslie Hore-Belisha. The Act was made in a year in which there had been a record numbers of road casualties.

== Background ==
The Locomotive Acts of the late 1800s had placed heavy restrictions on speeds of "locomotives". Under pressure from an emerging motor industry and growing enthusiasm for motor cars the Locomotives on Highways Act 1896 had reduced the restrictions and increased speed limits. Speed limits were again raised by the Motor Car Act 1903 which also introduced requirements for registration of vehicles and for driving licences as well as new safety legislation. The Road Traffic Act 1930 had controversially removed all speed limits for motorcars in a year with record 7,305 road fatalities (Note: Department for Transport (2008), p. 106 table 2) since which the levels of fatalities had increased to 7,343 deaths and 231,603 injuries. Half the deaths were of pedestrians, and of these three-quarters occurred in built-up areas. The Pedestrians' Association had been set up in 1929 to advocate on behalf of pedestrians with the Automobile Association and Royal Automobile Club resisting further legislation. The Salter Report which had been commissioned by the government was published in 1933 and recommended changes to the funding of both road and rail transport.

== Provisions ==
The act:

- Reintroduced a speed limit for cars, of 30mph in built-up areas, reversing the removal of speed limits only 4 years earlier by the Road Traffic Act 1930.
- The UK driving test was made compulsory for all new drivers from 1 June 1935.
- Strengthened legislation relating to insurance for drivers.
- Enabled pedestrian crossings to be created under regulations to be made under the Act

== Subsequent developments ==
Section 18 of the act defined pedestrian crossings as two rows of studs, 8' apart to be placed across the road. The studs (or painted substitutes) remain a feature of such crossings to this day. Further details of how the crossings were to work were left to Regulations to be made under the Act. These provided for orange beacons on poles at each side of the road and for pedestrians to have priority while on the crossing

The requirement for lights in the beacons (at first, some were painted metal) and for the lights to flash came later. Zebra stripes were added to the crossing in 1951. The beacons became known as Belisha beacons, after Leslie Hore-Belisha, the Transport Minister.

Section 8 of the act was repealed by section 9(1) of, and the schedule to, the Road Transport Lighting Act 1957 (5 & 6 Eliz. 2. c. 51), which came into force on 31 August 1957.

The whole act was repealed by section 1(1) of, and part X of schedule 1 to, the Statute Law (Repeals) Act 1989, which came into force on 16 November 1989.

As of 2015, the 30 mph speed limit in urban areas remains the most common speed limit.

== See also ==
- Locomotives on Highways Act 1896
- Motor Car Act 1903
- Roads Act 1920
- Road Traffic Act 1930
- Road Traffic Act 1988
- Road speed limits in the United Kingdom

== Bibliography ==
- Department for Transport (2008). "Reported Road Casualties Great Britain: 2008 Annual Report" (PDF). Road Casualties Great Britain. Archived from the original (PDF) on 12 September 2011.
