= Road Transport Lighting Act 1957 =

Act of the Parliament of the United Kingdom

Road Transport Lighting Act 1957 (Note: Section 12(1).)
- Act of Parliament
- Parliament of the United Kingdom
- Long title: An Act to consolidate certain enactments relating to the lighting of vehicles on roads.
- Citation: 5 & 6 Eliz. 2. c. 51
- Territorial extent: England and Wales; Scotland; (Note: Section 12(2).)

Dates
- Royal assent: 31 July 1957
- Commencement: 31 August 1957 (Note: Section 12(3).)
- Repealed: 1 July 1972
Other legislation
Amends	See § Repealed enactments
Repeals/revokes	See § Repealed enactments
Amended by	Road Transport Lighting (Amendment) Act 1958; Road Traffic Act 1960; Road Transport Lighting Act 1967; Road Traffic Regulation Act 1967
Repealed by	Road Traffic Act 1972

Status: Repealed

Text of statute as originally enacted

The Road Transport Lighting Act 1957 (5 & 6 Eliz. 2. c. 51) was an act of the Parliament of the United Kingdom that consolidated enactments relating to the lighting of vehicles on roads in Great Britain.

== Provisions ==
=== Repealed enactments ===
Section 9(1) of the act repealed 6 enactments, listed in the schedule to the act.

Citation	Short title	Extent of repeal
17 & 18 Geo. 5. c. 37	Road Transport Lighting Act 1927	The whole act.
8 & 9 Geo. 6. c. 8	Road Transport Lighting (Cycles) Act 1945	The whole act.
1 & 2 Eliz. 2. c. 21	Road Transport Lighting Act 1953	The whole act.
1 & 2 Eliz. 2. c. 22	Road Transport Lighting (No. 2) Act 1953	The whole act.
24 & 25 Geo. 5. c. 50	Road Traffic Act 1934	Section 8.
4 & 5 Eliz. 2. c. 67	Road Traffic Act 1956	Section 45.

== Subsequent developments ==
The whole act was repealed by section 205(1) of, and part I of schedule 9 to, the Road Traffic Act 1972, which came into force on 1 July 1972.
