= Road Traffic Act 1930 =

Act of the Parliament of the United Kingdom

Road Traffic Act 1930 (Note: Section 123(1).)
- Act of Parliament
- Parliament of the United Kingdom
- Long title: An Act to make provision for the regulation of traffic on roads and of motor vehicles and otherwise with respect to roads and vehicles thereon, to make provision for the protection of third parties against risks arising out of the use of motor vehicles and in connection with such protection to amend the Assurance Companies Act, 1909, to amend the law with respect to the powers of local authorities to provide public service vehicles, and for other purposes connected with the matters aforesaid.
- Citation: 20 & 21 Geo. 5. c. 43
- Introduced by: Herbert Morrison (Commons)
- Territorial extent: England and Wales; Scotland; (Note: Section 123(3).)

Dates
- Royal assent: 1 August 1930
- Commencement: 12 November 1930 (Note: The Road Traffic Act 1930 (Date of Commencement) Order (No. 1) 1930 (SI 1930/1003).); 1 December 1930 (Note: The Road Traffic Act 1930 (Date of Commencement) Order (No. 2) 1930 (SI 1930/1011).); 1 January 1931; 10 February 1931 (Note: The Road Traffic Act 1930 (Date of Commencement) Order (No. 1) 1931 (SI 1931/159).); 1 April 1931 (Note: The Road Traffic Act 1930 (Date of Commencement) Order (No. 2) 1931 (SI 1931/165).); 1 April 1936 (Note: The Road Traffic Act 1930 (Date of Commencement) Order (No. 1) 1936 (SI 1936/394).); (Note: Section 123(2).)
Other legislation
Amends	Stage Carriages Act 1832; London Hackney Carriages Act 1843; Town Police Clauses Act 1847; Locomotive Act 1861; Highways and Locomotives (Amendment) Act 1878
Repeals/revokes	Locomotives Act 1865; Locomotives on Highways Act 1896; Motor Car Act 1903
Amended by	Road Traffic (Amendment) Act 1931; Local Government Act 1933; Road Traffic Act 1934; Local Government (Scotland) Act 1947; Post Office Act 1953; Insurance Companies Act 1958; Highways Act 1959; Road Traffic Act 1960; Statute Law (Repeals) Act 1975; Statute Law (Repeals) Act 1993
Relates to	Assurance Companies Act 1909

Status: Partially repealed

Text of statute as originally enacted

Text of the Road Traffic Act 1930 as in force today (including any amendments) within the United Kingdom, from legislation.gov.uk.

The Road Traffic Act 1930 (20 & 21 Geo. 5. c. 43) is an act of the Parliament of the United Kingdom introduced by the Minister of Transport Herbert Morrison.

== Context ==
The last major legislation on road traffic had been the Motor Car Act 1903 ( 3 Edw. 7. c. 36). Amendments had been discussed in 1905, 1911, 1913 and 1914 as the Motor Car Act (1903) Amendment Bill and Motor Car Act (1903) Amendment (No 2) Bill. Since 1926 in which there were 4,886 fatalities in some 124,000 crashes a detailed set of national statistics (now known as Road Casualties Great Britain) had been collected. It was not until 1929 that a new Road Traffic Bill was discussed in detail following a Royal Commission report on Transport, "The control of traffic on roads," which was adopted almost in its entirety. During a parliamentary debate on making speedometers compulsory in 1932 it was suggested that speed limits for cars were removed by this Act because "the existing speed limit was so universally disobeyed that its maintenance brought the law into contempt" rather that for considerations of safety.

== Clauses ==
The act repealed the Locomotives Act 1865 (28 & 29 Vict. c. 83), the Locomotives on Highways Act 1896 (59 & 60 Vict. c. 36) and the Motor Car Act 1903 (3 Edw. 7. c. 36) and introduced many new regulations which controversially included the removal of all speed limits on UK roads for motor cars.

=== Relating to motor cars ===
- Abolition of all speed limits for cars
- Introduction of driving offences of dangerous, reckless and careless driving and driving whilst being unfit and under the influence of drink or drugs
- Compulsory third-party insurance
- The first UK driving tests for disabled drivers only
- Classification of motor vehicles
- Construction, weight and equipment of motor vehicles
- Issue of Highway Code

=== For public service vehicles ===
- Central regulation of UK coach services
- Introduction of a 30-mile an hour speed limit for buses and coaches.
- Issue of public service vehicles
- Rules regarding the conduct of drivers, conductors and passengers on public service vehicles.
- Limitation of hours of continuous driving

It was amended in 1988 and at other times.

== Third Parties (Rights against Insurers) Act 1930 ==
The act was strengthened by the Third Parties (Rights against Insurers) Act 1930.

== Legacy ==
Many clauses introduced by the act have been retained. Regulations relating to insurance, licensing and driving offences have continued to evolve since that date.

== See also ==
- Hill v Baxter
- Locomotives on Highways Act 1896
- Motor Car Act 1903
- Roads Act 1920
- Road Traffic Act 1934
- Traffic in Towns (1963)
- Road Traffic Act 1988
- Road Casualties Great Britain
- Road speed limits in the United Kingdom
