= Motor Car Act 1903 =

Act of the Parliament of the United Kingdom

Motor Car Act 1903 (Note: Section 20(3).)
- Act of Parliament
- Parliament of the United Kingdom
- Long title: An Act to amend the Locomotives on Highways Act, 1896.
- Citation: 3 Edw. 7. c. 36
- Territorial extent: United Kingdom

Dates
- Royal assent: 14 August 1903
- Commencement: 1 January 1904 (Note: Section 20(2).)
- Expired: 31 December 1906 (Note: Section 21.)
- Repealed: England and Wales and Scotland: 1 January 1931 (Note: The Road Traffic Act 1930 (Date of Commencement) Order (No. 2) 1930 (SI 1930/1011).); Northern Ireland:
Other legislation
Amends	Locomotives on Highways Act 1896
Amended by	Roads Act 1920
Repealed by	England and Wales and Scotland: Road Traffic Act 1930; Northern Ireland: Motor Vehicles (Traffic and Regulation) Act (Northern Ireland) 1926

Status: Repealed

History of passage through Parliament

Text of statute as originally enacted

The Motor Car Act 1903 (3 Edw. 7. c. 36) was an act of the Parliament of the United Kingdom that received royal assent on 14 August 1903, which introduced motor vehicle registration, driver licensing and increased the speed limit.

== Context ==
The act followed the Locomotives on Highways Act 1896 (59 & 60 Vict. c. 36) which had increased the speed limit for motorcars to 14 mph from the previous 4 mph in rural area and 2 mph in towns.

There were some who wished to see the speed limit removed altogether. The influential Automobile Club (soon to become the Royal Automobile Club or RAC) was split on the subject; the chair of the working group on the bill was John Douglas-Scott-Montagu MP who took a moderate line supporting speed limits, but was opposed on this by the chairman of the organisation Roger Wallace who were 'strongly against any speed limit' and described Montagu as a 'traitor'. The secretary of the club publicly proposed a 'compromise' of 25 mph without authorisation. Parliamentary debates were described as 'bitter'.

== Provisions ==
- Section 1 introduced the crime of reckless driving, and imposed penalties.
- Section 2 introduced the mandatory vehicle registration of all motor cars with the county council or county borough council in which the driver was resident. The council was to issue a unique number to each car, and prescribe the manner in which it was to be displayed on the vehicle. The act also made it an offence to drive a motor car on a public road without displaying its registration number. The Local Government Boards for England and Wales, for Scotland, and for Ireland were responsible for regulating the format of registration numbers and the design of number plates.
- Section 3 made it compulsory for drivers of motor cars in the United Kingdom to have a driving licence from "the first day of January, nineteen hundred and four". No driving test was required, the licence being issued by the council on payment of five shillings. The qualifying age for a car licence was 17 years and for a motor cycle, 14 years.
- The speed limit on public highway was raised to 20 mph from 14 mph which had been set by the Locomotives on Highways Act 1896.
- Section 9 allowed for lower speed limits to be implemented after a local inquiry.
- Section 10 required local authorities to erect signs indicating where there were prohibitions or speed limits lower than 20 mph and to warn of dangerous corners, cross roads and precipitous places;
- Regulations were introduced regarding the braking ability of vehicles.

== Subsequent developments ==
The Local Government Board issued a circular on 10 March 1904, Motor Car Use and Construction, which set out four standard designs for traffic signs:

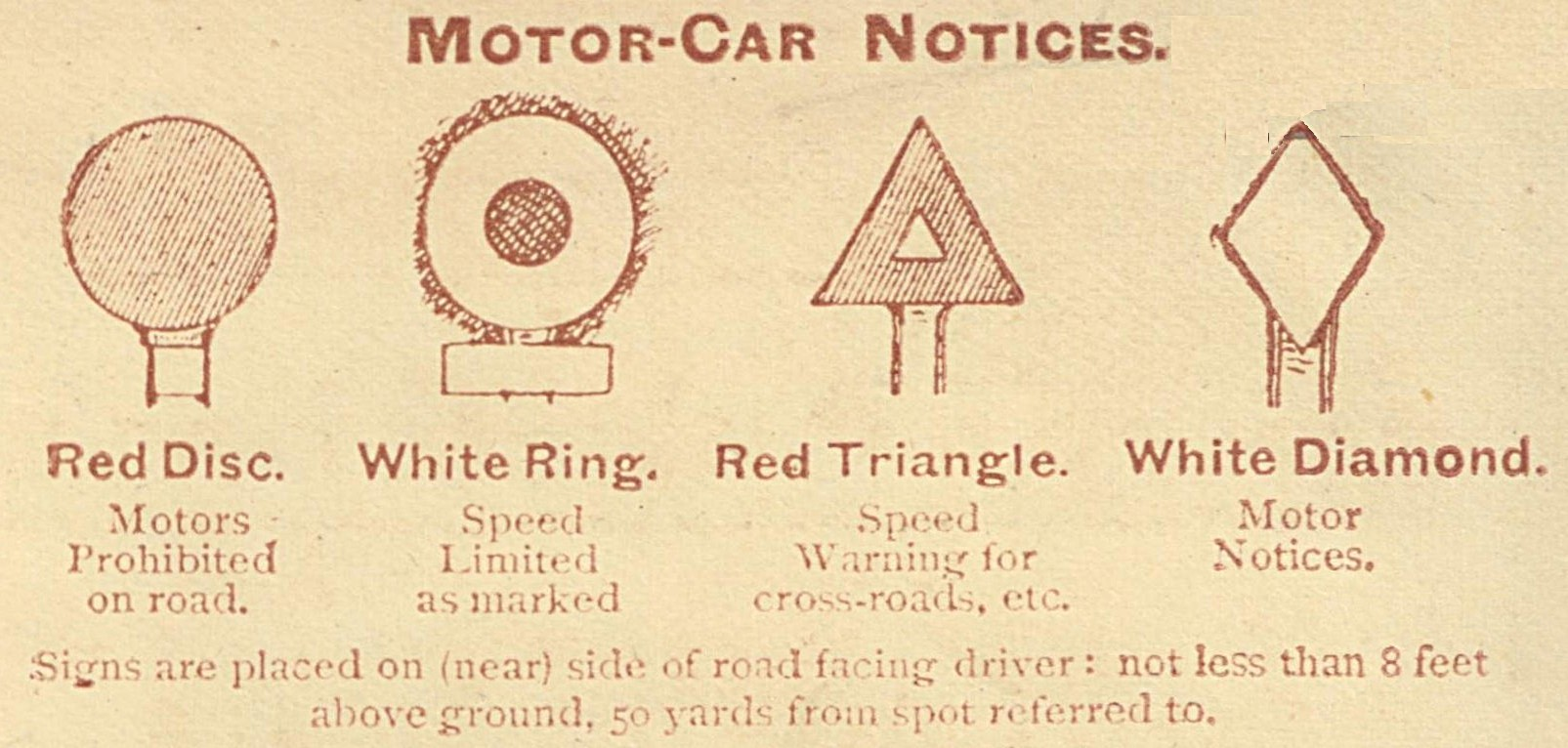
UK Traffic Signs 1904

- Prohibitory signs: to be surmounted by a solid red disc 18 inches in diameter
- Speed limit signs: to have a hollow white ring 18 inches in diameter above a plate giving the speed limit in figures
- Warning signs: to be surmounted by a hollow red equilateral triangle with 18-inch sides
- Other notices: to be on diamond-shaped boards

Local authorities started placing such traffic signs. The first three designs are the ancestors of modern traffic signs. Warning signs of a dangerous corner survive on the approach to the car park at Carisbrooke Castle, Isle of Wight.

The act was intended to expire after three years but was extended via the Expiring Laws Continuance Acts until the Road Traffic Act 1930 (20 & 21 Geo. 5. c. 43) repealed and replaced it and the Locomotives on Highways Act 1896 (59 & 60 Vict. c. 36).

A Royal Commission on Motor Cars was established in 1905 which reported in 1906 and recommended that motorcars should be taxed, that the speed limit should be abolished (by a majority vote only) and raised concern about the manner in which speed traps were being used to raise revenue in rural areas rather than being used to protect lives in towns. Amendments were discussed in 1905, 1911, 1913 1914 under the titles Motor Car Act (1903) Amendment bill and Motor Car Act (1903) Amendment (No 2) bill.

In the Irish Free State, the 1903 act was likewise continued by annual Expiring Laws Acts, until the Road Traffic Act 1933 repealed both the 1896 and 1903 acts.

== See also ==
- Locomotives on Highways Act 1896
- Roads Act 1920
- Road Traffic Act 1930
- Road Traffic Act 1934
- Road speed limits in the United Kingdom
- Rolls-Royce Legalimit

== Bibliography ==
=== Primary ===
Hansard, fourth series

- "Motor-Cars Bill [H.L.]". General Index to the 1903 Session. pp. 443–444.
- Online indexes: "Motor-Cars Bill" and "Motor-Cars Bill [H.L.]"
- Vol 124 col 1499 (HL 1R) — Vol 125 cols 523 (HL 2R); 976, 1256 (HL cttee) — Vol 126 cols 212 (HL report), 525 (HL 3R), 689 (HC 1R), 1454 (HC 2R) — Vol 127 cols 397 (HC cttee), 907 (HC report), 942 (HC 3R), 955 (HL consider HC amdts), 1282 (HL Royal Assent).

Sessional papers

- HL 1903 vi (160) 213 "Motor Cars Bill" [H.L.]
- HL 1903 vi (169) 237 "Motor Cars Bill" [H.L.] As amended in Committee
- HL 1903 vi (173) 249 "Motor Cars Bill" [H.L.] As amended in Standing Committee
- HL 1903 vi (176) 259 "Motor Cars Bill" [H.L.] As amended on Report
- HC 1903 iii (301) 403 "Motor Cars Bill" [H.L.] Brought from the Lords (29 July 1903)
- HC 1903 iii (317) 413 "Motor Cars Bill" [H.L.] As amended in Committee (7 August 1903)
