= Vehicle excise duty =

Motor vehicle tax in the United Kingdom

Vehicle excise duty (VED; also known as "vehicle tax", "car tax", "road tax", formerly as a "tax disc") is an annual tax in the United Kingdom that is levied as an excise duty. The VED must be paid for most types of powered vehicles which are to be used or parked on public roads. Registered vehicles that are not being used or parked on public roads and which have been taxed since 31 January 1998 must be covered by a Statutory Off Road Notification (SORN) to avoid VED. In 2016, VED generated approximately £6 billion for the Exchequer.

A vehicle tax was first introduced in Britain in 1888. In 1920, an excise duty was introduced that specifically applied to motor vehicles; initially it was hypothecated (ring-fenced or earmarked) for road construction and paid directly into a special Road Fund. After 1937, this reservation of vehicle revenue for roads was ended, and instead the revenue was paid into the Consolidated Fund – the general pot of money held by government. Since then, maintenance of the UK road network has been funded out of general taxation, of which VED is a part.

== Current regulations ==
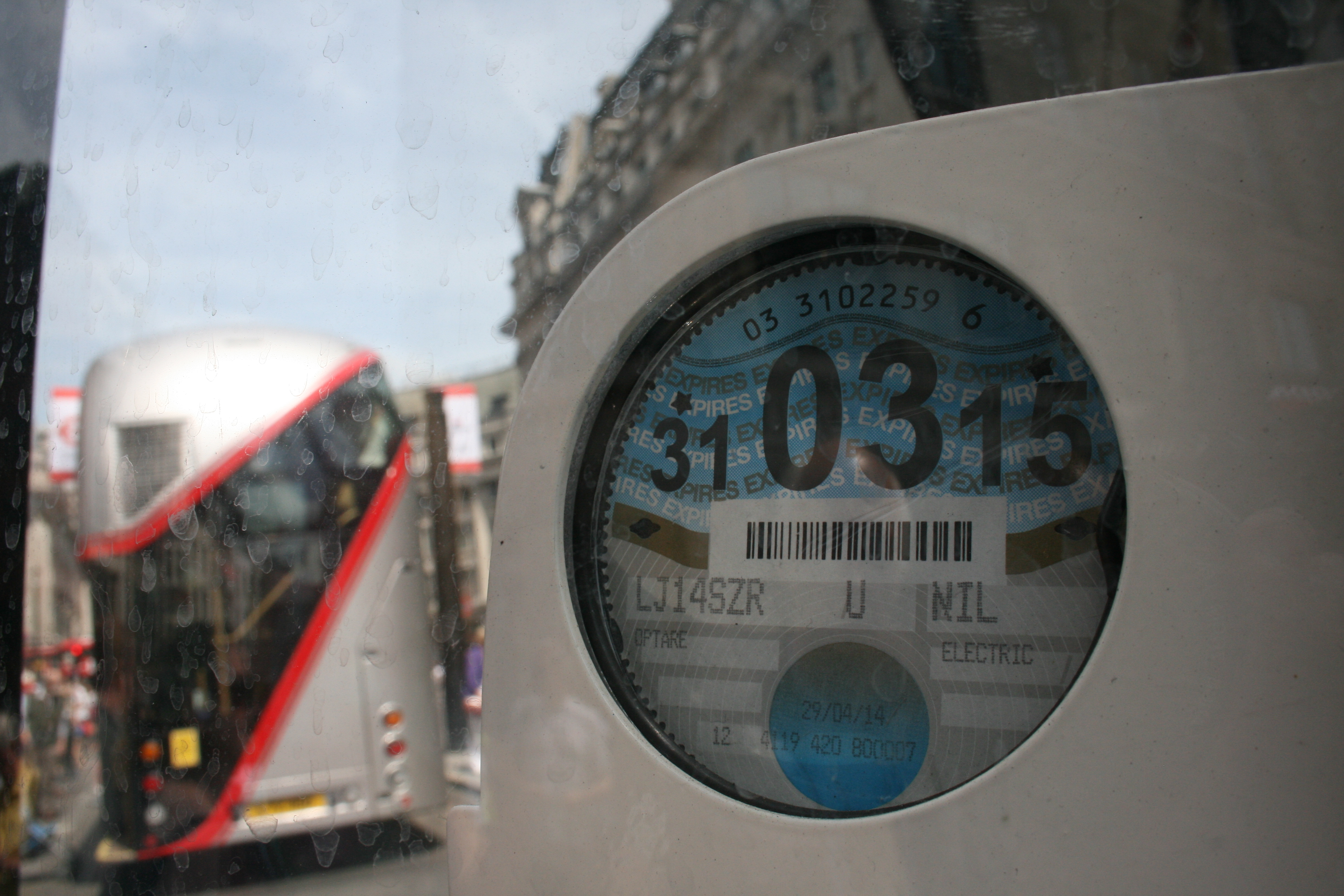
Prior to 2014, UK vehicles were required to display a tax disc as evidence of payment

VED across the United Kingdom is collected and enforced by the Driver and Vehicle Licensing Agency (DVLA). Until 2014, VED in Northern Ireland was collected by the Driver and Vehicle Agency there; responsibility has since been transferred to the DVLA.

The registered keeper of a vehicle that is liable for VED must pay the appropriate VED amount (which may be zero) to license the vehicle for road use. Owners of registered vehicles which have been licensed since 31 January 1998 and who do not now wish to use or store a vehicle on the public highway are not required to pay VED, but are required to submit an annual Statutory Off-Road Notification (SORN). Failure to submit a SORN is punishable in the same manner as failure to pay duty when using the vehicle on public roads.

Until 1 October 2014 a vehicle licence (tax disc) had to be displayed on a vehicle (usually adhered inside the windscreen on the nearside, thus easily visible to officials patrolling roads on foot) as evidence of having paid the duty. Since that date, the circular paper discs have not been issued and there is no longer a requirement to display a disc as the records are now stored in a centralised database and accessible using the vehicle registration plate details.

=== Cars ===
There are three payment schedules in effect, depending on whether the car was first registered before or after 1 April 2017, or before 1 March 2001. Further changes took effect in April 2025, affecting new and existing electric vehicles.

==== Registered before 1 March 2001 ====
For cars registered before 1 March 2001 the excise duty is based on engine size.

	Cost as of 1 April 2025 (£) (single annual payment)
Vehicle engine size <1549 cc	220
Vehicle engine size >1549 cc	360

==== Registered before 1 April 2017 ====
For vehicles registered between 1 March 2001 and 31 March 2017 charges are based on theoretical CO_{2} emission rates per kilometre. The price structure was revised from 1 April 2013 to introduce an alternative charge for the first year (the standard cost was not changed, and remained the same as for 2001 onwards). The "first year rate" only applies in the year the vehicle was first registered and is said by the government to be designed to send "a stronger signal to the buyer about the environmental implications of their car purchase".

Charges as applicable from 1 April 2025:

Vehicles registered between 1 March 2001 and 31 March 2017
Car emission band	Standard cost (£)	Notes
Band A (up to 100 g/km)	20	
Band B (101–110 g/km)	20	
Band C (111–120 g/km)	35	
Band D (121–130 g/km)	160	
Band E (131–140 g/km)	190	
Band F (141- 150 g/km)	210	
Band G (151 to 165 g/km)	255	
Band H (166 to 175 g/km)	305	
Band I (176 to 185 g/km)	335	
Band J (186 to 200 g/km)	385	
Band K (201 to 225 g/km)	415	Also vehicles with >225 g/km registered before 23 March 2006.
Band L (226 to 255 g/km)	710	
Band M (Over 255 g/km)	735	

==== Registered after 1 April 2017 ====
The biggest changes from April 2017 were that hybrid vehicles were no longer rated at £0, and that cars with a retail price of £40,000 and over would pay a supplement for years 2 to 6.

	First year rate	Second year onwards rate
CO_{2} emissions	Diesel cars (TC49) that meet the RDE2 standard, petrol cars (TC48), Alternative fuel and zero emission cars	
0 g/km	£10	£195
1 to 50 g/km	£110	£195
51 to 75 g/km	£130	£195
76 to 90 g/km	£270	£195
91 to 100 g/km	£350	£195
101 to 110 g/km	£390	£195
111 to 130 g/km	£440	£195
131 to 150 g/km	£540	£195
151 to 170 g/km	£1,360	£195
171 to 190 g/km	£2,190	£195
191 to 225 g/km	£3,300	£195
226 to 255 g/km	£4,680	£195
Over 255 g/km	£5,490	£195

For cars with a "list price" over £40,000 an additional amount – the 'expensive car supplement' – is paid at the first five annual renewals, i.e. in years 2 to 6 of the vehicle's life. At first the supplement applied to all types of car, but the 2020 Budget provided an exemption for zero-emission vehicles (both new and existing), effective from 1 April 2020; this exemption ended in April 2025. The supplement increases each year, and is £425 from April 2025.

==== Changes on 1 April 2025 ====
In November 2022, the UK government announced that reduced tax rates for zero-emission vehicles would cease on 1 April 2025, making rates the same as for those with internal combustion engines. The changes affect new and existing vehicles as follows:

- Zero-emission cars first registered on or after 1 April 2017 will pay the 1–50g/km rate in their first year of registration, and the standard annual rate in subsequent years.
- The £10 reduction for alternative fuel vehicles and hybrid vehicles will be removed, bringing them also onto the standard rate.
- The exemption from the expensive car supplement was already due to end in 2025.

== Other vehicle tax rates ==
=== Light goods vehicles (TC39) ===
Registered on or after 1 March 2001 and not over 3,500 kg revenue weight (also known as maximum or gross vehicle weight).

Single 12 month payment	Single 12 month payment by Direct Debit	Total of 12 monthly instalments by Direct Debit	Single 6 month payment	6 months by Direct Debit
£290	£290	£304.50	£159.50	£152.25

=== Euro 4 light goods vehicles (TC36) ===
Registered between 1 March 2003 and 31 December 2006, Euro 4 compliant and not over 3,500 kg revenue weight.

Single 12 month payment	Single 12 month payment by Direct Debit	Total of 12 monthly instalments by Direct Debit	Single 6 month payment	6 months by Direct Debit
£140	£140	£147	£77	£73.50

=== Euro 5 light goods vehicles (TC36) ===
Registered between 1 January 2009 and 31 December 2010, Euro 5 compliant and not over 3,500 kg revenue weight.

Single 12 month payment	Single 12 month payment by Direct Debit	Total of 12 monthly instalments by Direct Debit	Single 6 month payment	6 months by Direct Debit
£140	£140	£147	£77	£73.50

=== Motorcycle (with or without sidecar) (TC17) ===
Engine size (cc)	Single 12 month payment	Single 12 month payment by Direct Debit	Total of 12 monthly instalments by Direct Debit	Single 6 month payment	6 months by Direct Debit
Not over 150	£26	£26	£27.30	N/A	N/A
151-400	£57	£57	£59.85	£31.35	£29.93
401-600	£87	£87	£91.35	£47.85	£45.68
Over 600	£121	£121	£127.05	£66.55	£63.53

=== Tricycles (not over 450 kg unladen) (TC50) ===
Engine size (cc)	Single 12 month payment	Single 12 month payment by Direct Debit	Total of 12 monthly instalments by Direct Debit	Single 6 month payment	6 months by Direct Debit
Tricycle not over 150	£26	£26	£27.30	N/A	N/A
All other tricycles	£121	£121	£127.05	£55.55	£53.03

=== Trade licences ===
Trade licences are available for between 6 and 12 months, depending on the month in which the application is made.

Issue month	Expiry month	Period	Rate (most vehicles)	Rate (bicycles and tricycles)
January	June	6 months	£94.05	£65.55
January	December	12 months	£171	£121
February	December	11 months	£171	£121
March	December	10 months	£156.75	£110.90
April	December	9 months	£141.05	£99.80
May	December	8 months	£125.40	£88.75
June	December	7 months	£109.70	£77.65
July	December	6 months	£94.05	£66.55
August	June	11 months	£171	£121
September	June	10 months	£156.75	£110.90
October	June	9 months	£141.05	£99.80
November	June	8 months	£125.40	£88.75
December	June	7 months	£109.70	£77.65

=== Heavy goods vehicles ===
VED payable for heavy goods vehicles (those over 3,500 kg revenue weight) varies according to their weight and axle configuration. The 12-month rates applicable from 1 August 2023 range from £80 to £850.

An additional HGV levy for vehicles with a revenue weight of 12,000 kg or more was introduced with effect from 1 April 2014. The levy is paid at the same time as VED, the amount varying according to weight, axle configuration and emissions rating; there are higher levies for vehicles pulling a trailer of over 4,000 kg. The 12-month levies applicable from 1 August 2023 range from £150 to £749.

Vehicles over 12,000 kg that are not registered in the UK must also pay the HGV levy before entering the UK, although zero-emission vehicles are exempt. Payment can be made on a daily, weekly, monthly or annual basis. The rate ranges from £3 per day (or £150 per year) to £10 per day (or £749 per year).

The HGV levy was suspended from 1 August 2020 to 31 July 2023 to support the haulage sector and aid pandemic recovery efforts.

== Exempt vehicles ==
Various classes and uses of vehicle are exempt, including vehicles older than 40 years (see below), trams, vehicles which cannot convey people, police vehicles, fire engines, ambulances and health service vehicles, mine rescue vehicles, lifeboat vehicles, certain road construction and maintenance vehicles, vehicles for disabled people, certain agricultural and land maintenance vehicles, road gritters and snow ploughs, vehicles undergoing statutory tests, vehicles imported by members of foreign armed forces, and crown vehicles. Electrically propelled vehicles were exempt until 1995 (at a time when the most common electric vehicles were milk floats); today, they are not exempt, though they were generally zero-rated until April 2025.

Each year on 1 April, vehicles constructed more than forty years before the start of that year become eligible for a free vehicle licence under "historic vehicle" legislation. This is due to the age of the vehicle and a presumption of limited mileage. Initially this was a rolling exemption applied to any vehicles over 25 years old; however, in 1997 the cutoff date was frozen at 1 January 1973. The change to "pre-1973" was unpopular in the classic motoring community, and a number of classic car clubs campaigned for a change back to the previous system. In 2006 there were 307,407 vehicles in this category.

On 1 April 2014, vehicles manufactured before 1 January 1974 became exempt from the VED (Finance Act 2014, as set out in the 2013 Budget, 20 March 2013). In the 2014 Budget, the government introduced the forty-year rolling exemption, with vehicles built before 1 January 1975 becoming exempt on 1 April 2015 and so on.

== Enforcement ==
In 2008 it was reported that flaws in DVLA enforcement practices have meant that more than a million late-paying drivers per year have evaded detection, which lost £214 million in VED revenue during 2006. It was estimated that 6.7% of motorcycles were not taxed in 2007. Since then better systems reduced the loss to an estimated £33.9 million in 2009/2010.

Automatic number plate recognition (ANPR) systems are being used to identify untaxed, uninsured vehicles and stolen cars.

== History ==
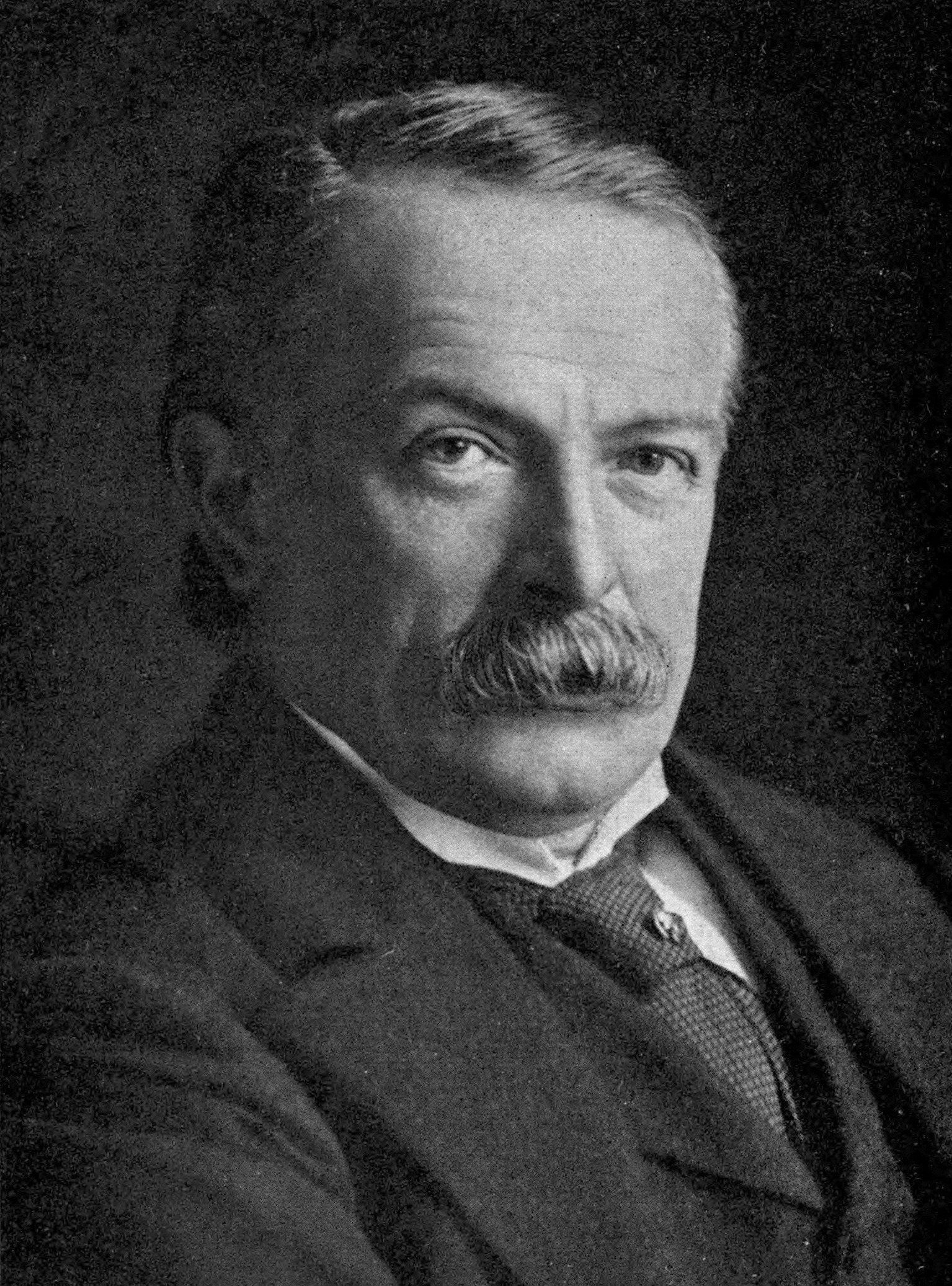
The government of David Lloyd George introduced a hypothecated motor vehicle tax in 1920 to pay for the road network.

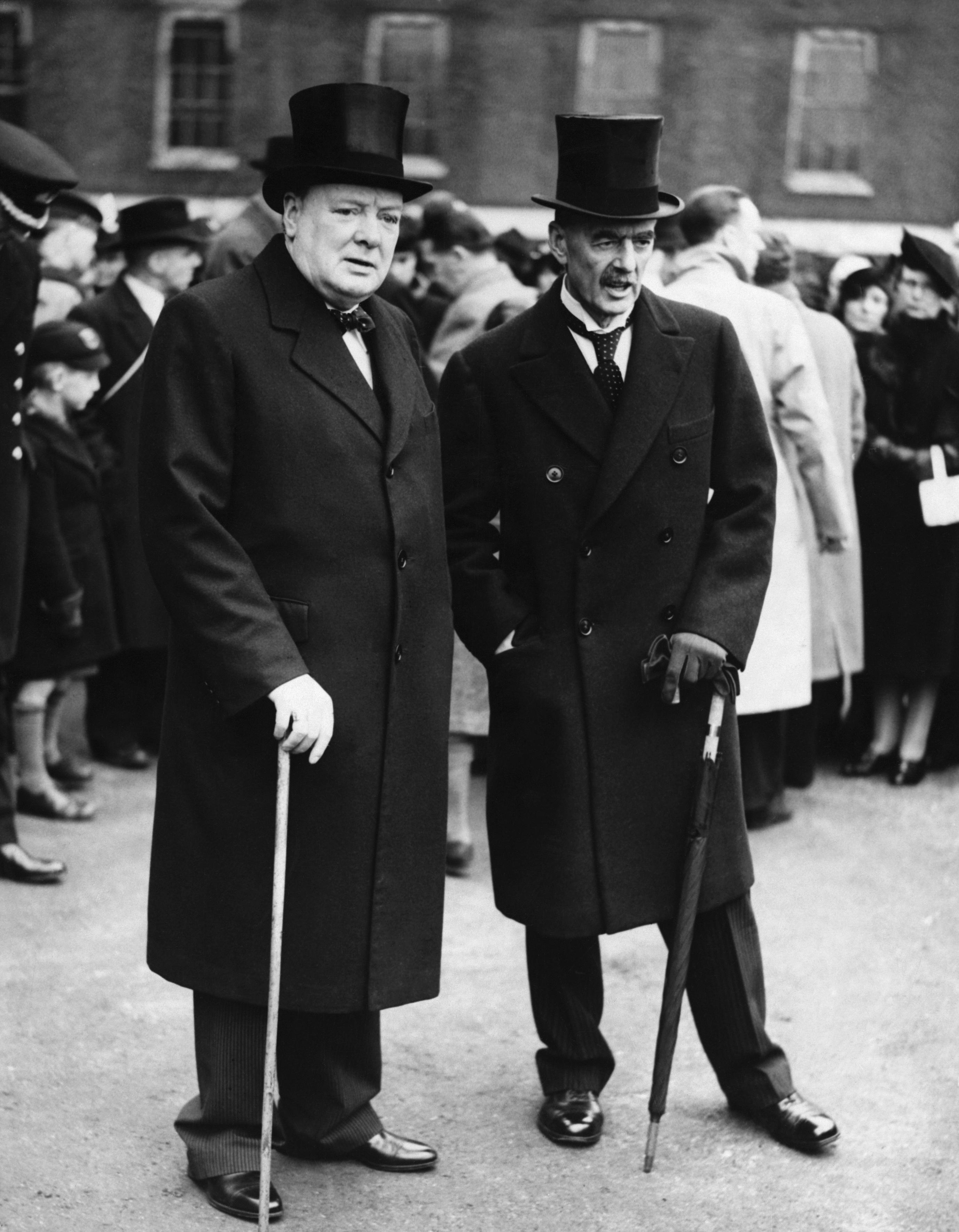
Hypothecation of vehicle tax was opposed by Churchill and ended by Chamberlain's government in 1937.

Following the 1888 budget, two new vehicle duties were introduced – the locomotive duty and the trade cart duty (a general wheel-tax also announced in the same budget was abandoned). The locomotive duty was levied at £5 (equivalent to £561.89 as of 2025), for each locomotive used on the public roads and the trade cart duty was introduced for all trade vehicles (including those which were mechanically powered) not subject to the existing carriage duty, with the exception of those used in agriculture and those weighing less than 10 cwt-imperial, at the rate of 5s (£0.25) per wheel.

=== The Road Fund ===
In the budget of 1909, the then Chancellor of the Exchequer, David Lloyd George announced that the roads system would be self-financing, and so from 1910 the proceeds of road vehicle excise duties were dedicated to fund the building and maintenance of the road system. Even during this period the majority of the cost of road building and improvement came from general and local taxation owing to the tax being too low for the upkeep of the roads.

The Roads Act 1920 required councils to "register all new vehicles and to allocate a separate number to each vehicle" and "make provision for the collection and application of the excise duties on mechanically propelled vehicles and on carriages". The Finance Act 1920 introduced a "Duty on licences for mechanically propelled vehicles" which was to be hypothecated – that is, the revenue would be exclusively dedicated to a particular expenditure, namely the newly established Road Fund. Excise duties specifically for mechanically propelled vehicles were first imposed in 1921, along with the requirement to display a vehicle licence (tax disc) on the vehicle.

=== End of hypothecation ===
The accumulated Road Fund was never fully spent on roads (most of it was spent on resurfacing, not the building of new roads), and became notorious for being used for other government purposes, a practice introduced by Winston Churchill when he was Chancellor of the Exchequer. In 1926, by which time the direct use of taxes collected from motorists to fund the road network was already opposed by many in government, the Chancellor, Winston Churchill is reported to have said in a memo: "Entertainments may be taxed; public houses may be taxed ... and the yield devoted to the general revenue. But motorists are to be privileged for all time to have the tax on motors devoted to roads? This is an outrage upon ... common sense." Hypothecation came to an end in 1937 under the 1936 Finance Act, and the proceeds of the vehicle road taxes were paid directly into the Exchequer. The Road Fund itself, then funded by government grants, was not abolished until 1955.

=== 1990s ===
Since 1998, keepers of registered vehicles which had been licensed since 1998, but which were not currently using the public roads, have been required to submit an annual Statutory Off-Road Notification (SORN). Failure to submit a SORN is punishable in the same manner as failure to pay duty when using the vehicle on public roads. It was announced in the 2013 Budget that SORN declarations would become perpetual, thus removing the need for annual renewal after the initial declaration has been made. In June 1999, a reduced VED band was introduced for cars with an engine capacity up to 1100cc. The cost of 12 months tax for cars up to 1100cc was £100, and for those above 1100cc was £155.

=== 2001 onwards: incentives for lower emissions ===
During the 1990s, political arguments were put forward for the abolition of VED. Among the proposals was a suggestion that VED could be replaced by increased fuel duty as an incentive for consumers to purchase vehicles with lower emission ratings. The proposal was politically unappealing, as it would increase costs for businesses and for people living in rural areas. Rather than abolish VED, the Labour government under Tony Blair introduced a new system for calculating of VED that was linked explicitly with a vehicle's carbon emissions ratings, as a means for vehicle emissions control. Since March 2001, VED for cars has been levied in a system of tax bands based on CO_{2} ratings.

In tax year 2002–2003, it is estimated that evasion of the tax equated to a loss to the Exchequer of £206 million. In an attempt to reduce this, from 2004 an automatic £80 penalty (halved if paid within 28 days) is issued by the DVLA computer for failure to pay the tax within one month of expiry. A maximum fine of £1,000 applies for failure to pay the tax, though in practice fines are normally much lower.

In April 2009 there was a reclassification to the CO_{2} rating based bandings, with the highest set at £455 per year and the lowest at £0; the bands were also backdated to cover vehicles registered on or after 1 March 2001, meaning that vehicles with the highest emissions ratings registered after this date pay the most. Vehicles registered before 1 March 2001 continued to be charged according to engine size, above or below 1549cc.

In 2010, different first-year rates were introduced as a signal to purchasers.

VED can be automatically be collected from a bank account by direct debit. VED can still be paid if a reminder is not received.

== See also ==
- Car costs
- London congestion charge
- Motoring taxation in the United Kingdom
- Road Fund
- Vehicle registration plates of the United Kingdom
- Velology – the study and collection of tax discs
- Vignette (road tax)
