= Road Fund =

1920–1955 UK government fund for road maintenance

The Road Fund was a British Government fund designated to pay for the building and maintenance of the United Kingdom road network. Its income came originally from Vehicle Excise Duty, until that ceased to be hypothecated for roads use in 1936, and then from government grants. It was created by the Roads Act 1920 and Finance Act 1920, and was wound up in the Miscellaneous Financial Provisions Act 1955.

The Road Fund is notable as one of the few beneficiaries of hypothecated taxation in British history, and is the root of a popular misconception that Vehicle Excise Duty (especially when referred to as road tax) is still hypothecated. Between 1920 and 1936 the vehicle licence (tax disc) was officially known as the "Road Fund Licence", a term which is still in common use today.

== History ==
The origins of the road fund can be traced back to a number of "assigned revenues" granted to local authorities in 1888 as part of a financial settlement to limit recurrent demands for grants from central government. In the budget of 1909, the then Chancellor of the Exchequer, David Lloyd George combined these grants into a single tax on petrol and a duty on the rated horsepower of motor cars. Under the same act it became compulsory for motor vehicles subject to VED to display a vehicle licence (tax disc) as visible evidence of having paid the tax. Road locomotives were subject to a separate 'wetted tax', where the fee was proportional to the size of the wetted area of the steam boiler.

In 1907 a major problem associated with roads was the level of dust raised by passing motor vehicles and there was support for a tax of £1 or 10s. per horse-power to pay for improvements to roads to solve this problem.

At the time Lloyd George announced that the roads system would be self-financing so from 1910 the proceeds of road vehicle excise duties, which had been in existence in various forms since 1889, were dedicated to fund the building and maintenance of the road system under a scheme known as the Road Board. Under the Roads Act 1920 the Road Board was replaced by the Road Fund, dedicated solely to road building on the basis that no other claims would be made on the Exchequer for construction of new roads.

The Road Fund was never fully utilised, returning a surplus each year, and it became notorious for being used for other government purposes. Winston Churchill opposed the Road Fund, saying:

It will be only a step from this for them to claim in a few years the moral ownership of the roads their contributions have created.

In 1926 as Chancellor of the Exchequer Churchill sought, successfully, to redirect a third of payments as taxation on luxury and pleasure uses with the stated aim of putting competition between road and rail on a fair basis. At the same time, the majority of road building and maintenance costs were met from general and local taxation.

In 1932 Lieut. Colonel Moore-Brabazon said in a debate in the House of Commons about the Road Fund:

This vote is different from any other because the money that goes to the Ministry of Transport is motorists' money. It is not Imperial taxation. It is money that comes from the motorists, to be spent on one definite thing, namely, the roads. If the Government come to the conclusion that they are going to spend less money on the roads, they have to make a case to the motorists why they are not going to reduce the taxation upon their cars. If they are going to keep on the same taxation and to spend the money derived from the motorists upon Imperial taxation, let them say so.

== Winding up ==
Hypothecation of VED into the Road Fund was formally ended under the Finance Act 1936, in accordance with the recommendations of the Salter Report that controversially sought to introduce a balance between the road haulage industry and the railways. It had concluded that the method of road funding, which had relied on parishes and local authorities to fund a portion of the road network through their own means, represented a subsidy to the road hauliers. After the 1936 act the proceeds of road vehicle duties were to be paid directly into the Exchequer. The Road Fund itself was finally wound up in the Miscellaneous Financial Provisions Act 1955, becoming a system of funding through government grants.

== See also ==
- Vehicle Excise Duty
