= Roads Act 1920 =

Act of the Parliament of the United Kingdom

Roads Act 1920 (Note: Section 20(1).)
- Act of Parliament
- Parliament of the United Kingdom
- Long title: An Act to make provision for the collection and application of the excise duties on mechanically-propelled vehicles and on carriages; to amend the Finance Act, 1920, as respects such duties; and to amend the Motor Car Acts, 1896 and 1903, and the Development and Road Improvement Funds Act, 1909; and to make other provision with respect to roads and vehicles used on roads, and for purposes connected therewith.
- Citation: 10 & 11 Geo. 5. c. 72
- Territorial extent: United Kingdom

Dates
- Royal assent: 23 December 1920
- Commencement: 1 January 1921 (Note: Section 20(2).)
- Repealed: 22 July 2004
Other legislation
Amends	Motor Car Act 1896; Motor Car Act 1903; Development and Road Improvement Funds Act 1909; Finance Act 1920
Amended by	Statute Law Revision Act 1950; Highways Act 1959; Statute Law (Repeals) Act 1975; Statute Law (Repeals) Act 1989; Statute Law (Repeals) Act 1993
Repealed by	Statute Law (Repeals) Act 2004

Status: Repealed

Text of statute as originally enacted

Revised text of statute as amended

The Roads Act 1920 (10 & 11 Geo. 5. c. 72) was an act of the Parliament of the United Kingdom which established the Road Fund, and introduced tax discs.

== Provisions ==
The act:

- Required county councils to register all new vehicles and to allocate a separate number to each vehicle, in a continuation of the vehicle registration scheme introduced under the Motor Car Act 1903 (3 Edw. 7. c. 36)
- It clarified the situation regarding cars driven by internal combustion engines, replacing complex previous legislation for different types of vehicle.
- Provision for the collection and application of the excise duties on mechanically-propelled vehicles and on carriages.
- Creation of the Road Fund.

== Subsequent developments ==
Section 18(a) and 18(c) of the act were repealed by section 1(1) of, and the first schedule to, the Statute Law Revision Act 1950 (14 Geo. 6. c. 6), which came into force on 23 May 1950.

Section 4 of, and the schedule to, the act were repealed by section 1(1) of, and part X of schedule 1 to, the Statute Law (Repeals) Act 1989, which came into force on 16 November 1989.

The whole act was repealed by section 1(1) of, and part 14 of schedule 1 to, the Statute Law (Repeals) Act 2004, which came into force on 22 July 2004.

== See also ==
- Locomotives on Highways Act 1896
- Motor Car Act 1903
- Road Traffic Act 1930
- Road Traffic Act 1934
- Road speed limits in the United Kingdom
