= Vignette (road tax) =

Tax imposed based on time on a road

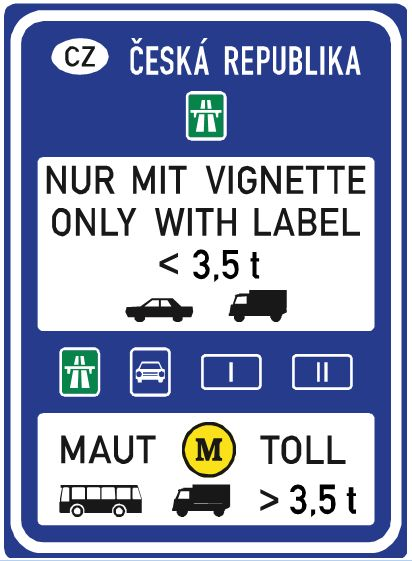
Czech roadsign indicating that certain vehicles require a vignette

Vignette is a form of road pricing imposed on vehicles, usually in addition to the compulsory road tax, based on a period of time the vehicle may use the road, instead of road tolls that are based on distance travelled. Vignettes are currently used in several European countries. The term originated in France in the 1950s, although vignettes there were not linked to motorway use and no longer exist; it is now used throughout Central Europe, as well as in Italy (vignetta).

Vignettes are used in Austria, Bulgaria, the Czech Republic, Hungary, Moldova, Romania, Slovakia, Slovenia and Switzerland. In most of these countries a small, coloured sticker is affixed to a vehicle windscreen, but in Bulgaria, Czech Republic, Hungary, Romania, Slovakia and since 2021 in Slovenia these have been superseded by electronic vignettes. In Moldova, vignettes are required for the use of any road, while in Bulgaria and Romania they are required for the use of any road outside urban areas. In the other countries, vignettes are required only for the use of motorways and expressways.

Prices for an annual vignette for passenger cars range from €30 to €150, depending on country. In all countries except Switzerland, short-period vignettes are sold for visiting or transiting vehicles. In Switzerland, visiting foreign motorists must buy an annual vignette to use the country's motorways. Vignettes can usually be obtained at border crossings, gas stations and other outlets. Improperly used or lost vignettes are usually not refunded.

Vignette stickers are usually constructed in such a way that detaching and re-attaching them is impossible without destruction, ensuring that they cannot be used on more than one vehicle. Road traffic is often monitored by roadside cameras, and vignettes are verified by state officials, such as border guards and national police. Hefty cash fines are often charged to travelers using public roads without a valid and properly affixed vignette. Additional tolls are usually levied for passing through certain motorway tunnels and bridges. In Austria a tunnel or bridge subject to a special toll (de:Sondermautstrecke) is in theory free of the vignette obligation, but in practice this is usually a moot point as access to many of them is via motorway only.

== Vignette obligation by country ==
=== European Union ===
The Eurovignette Directive introduced in the European Union in 1993 governs road tolls for trucks of minimum 12 metric tonnes. An international agreement, based on Article 8 of the Eurovignette Directive, signed in 1994 by Belgium, Denmark, Germany, Luxembourg, and the Netherlands established a common system of vignettes within the Eurovignette framework. Sweden signed a protocol to accede to the agreement in 1997. Germany denounced the agreement in 2017, as did Belgium in 2019 and Denmark in 2024.

=== Austria ===
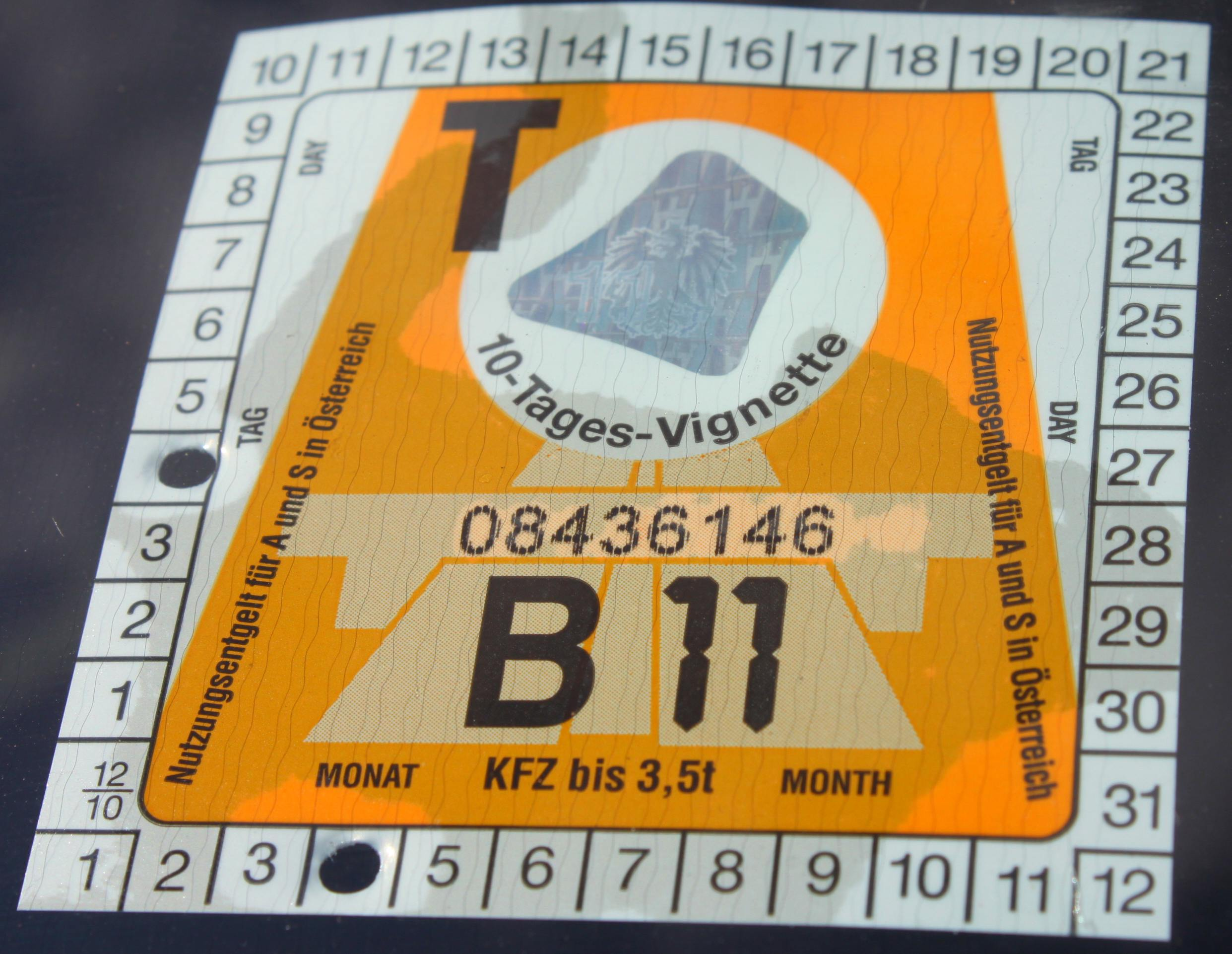
Austrian vignette, valid for 10 days, starting on 4 April 2011.

Since 1997, vignettes are required for all vehicles of up to 3.5 tonnes, driving on motorways and expressways (prefixed with letters A and S) under federal administration. Vignettes are overseen by the police and toll-sheriff employees of the federal motorway administration. A €240 fine with an additional obligatory payment of a substitute toll are charged to travelers without a valid vignette, and unpaid fines lead to penalties between €300 and €3,000. Furthermore, the vehicle may be confiscated from foreigners to guarantee payment of the penalty.

Additional tolls are charged for certain motorway sections where tollgates and video tolling systems are installed. Several sections require drivers to buy electronic toll cards. Vignettes for vehicles of over 3.5 tonnes were replaced with electronic distance-based highway-toll GO-Boxes on 1 January 2004. Since 2019, electronic vignettes have been made available in addition to the traditional stickers.

The official website for buying Austrian digital vignettes is shop.asfinag.at.

=== Bulgaria ===
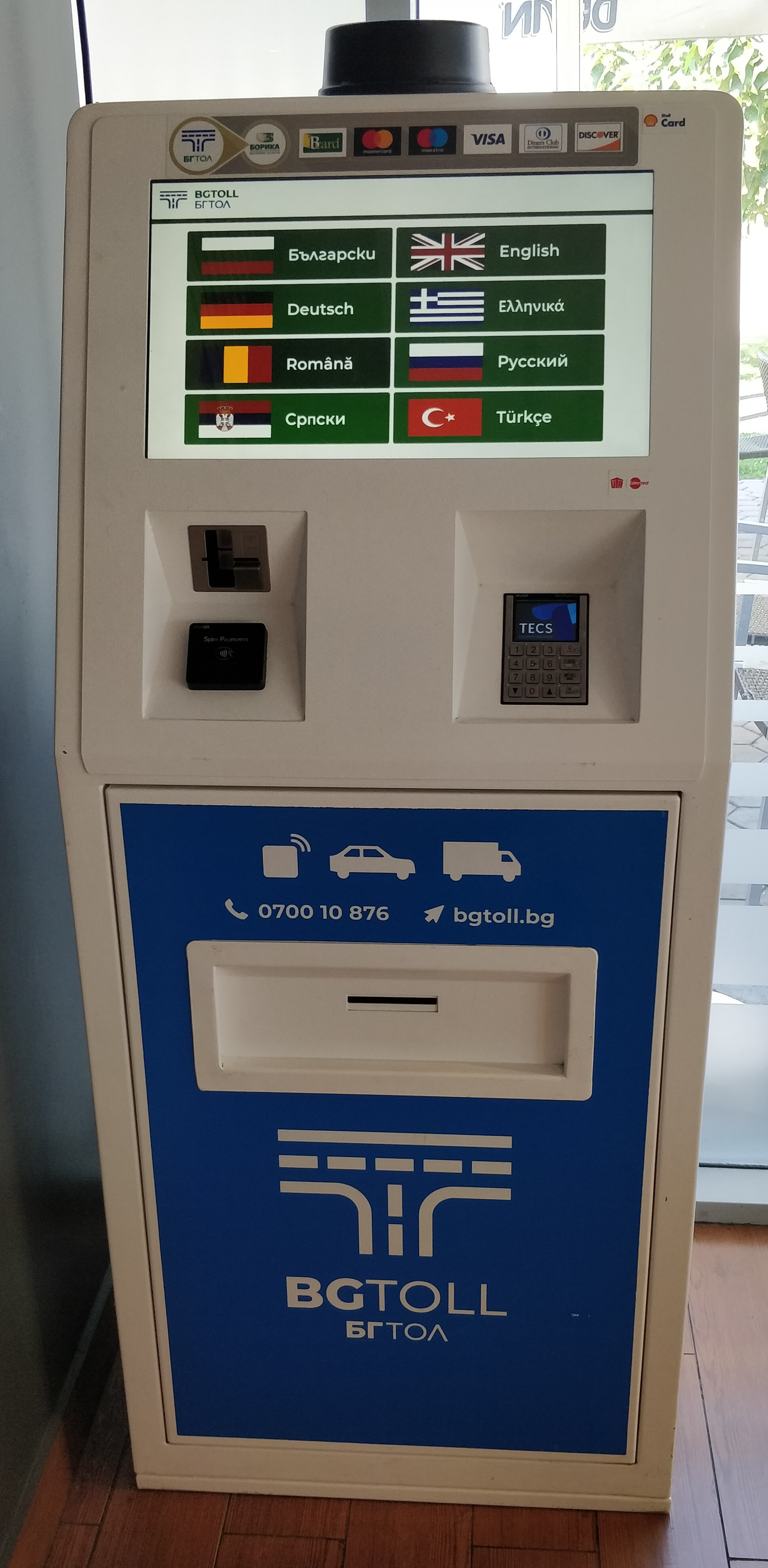
A vignette machine in Bulgaria

Vignettes are required for all four-wheeled motor vehicles and trailers under 3.5 metric tons that use public roads, with the exception of cities, towns, and villages. Motorcycles, ATVs, and farm equipment are exempt. For vehicles over 3.5 tons, drivers are required to pay a toll based on the distance traveled.

All vignettes in Bulgaria are electronic and are usually valid from the time they are purchased, but some types can be set to start at a future date. They can be bought in person at all border crossings, at most gas stations, at post offices, and at some bank branches. Vignettes can also be purchased online using the National Toll Administraton's website and its network of official partners.

=== Czech Republic ===
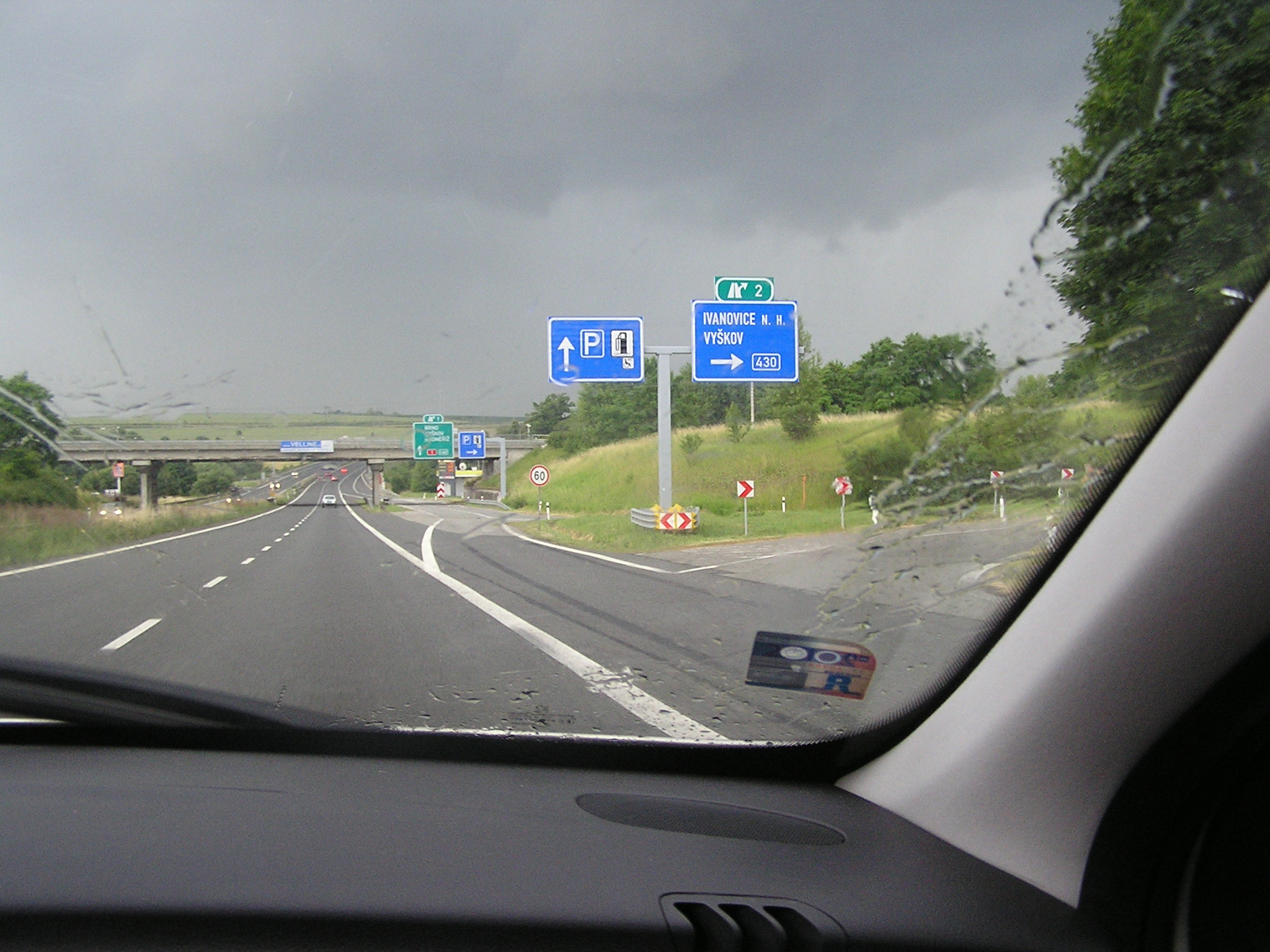
Vignette affixed on a car's windshield on the R-46 expressway in the Czech Republic.

Vignettes are required for the use of motorways and expressways by all vehicles of up to 3.5 tonnes. Cash fines for not displaying a valid vignette affixed on a car's windshield range from €80 to €200. Vignettes for heavier vehicles were replaced with electronic toll collection in 2007. By 1 January 2021, the vignette stickers were replaced by digital vignettes.

The official website for buying Czech electronic vignettes is edalnice.cz.

=== Germany ===
Motorways and expressways are a toll-free road network for all lighter vehicles. The Eurovignette system for trucks was abolished in August 2003. A distance-based toll charge was introduced from 1 January 2005 for vehicles of over 12 tonnes, operated by the Toll Collect company.

As of 1 March 2007, all drivers are required to purchase an emission sticker when passing through low-emission zones in several cities and municipalities. Certain "green zones" have completely disallowed entrance to vehicles with higher particle emissions ("yellow" and "red" groups). Travellers passing through these areas without the sticker are charged with a €100 fine.

=== Hungary ===
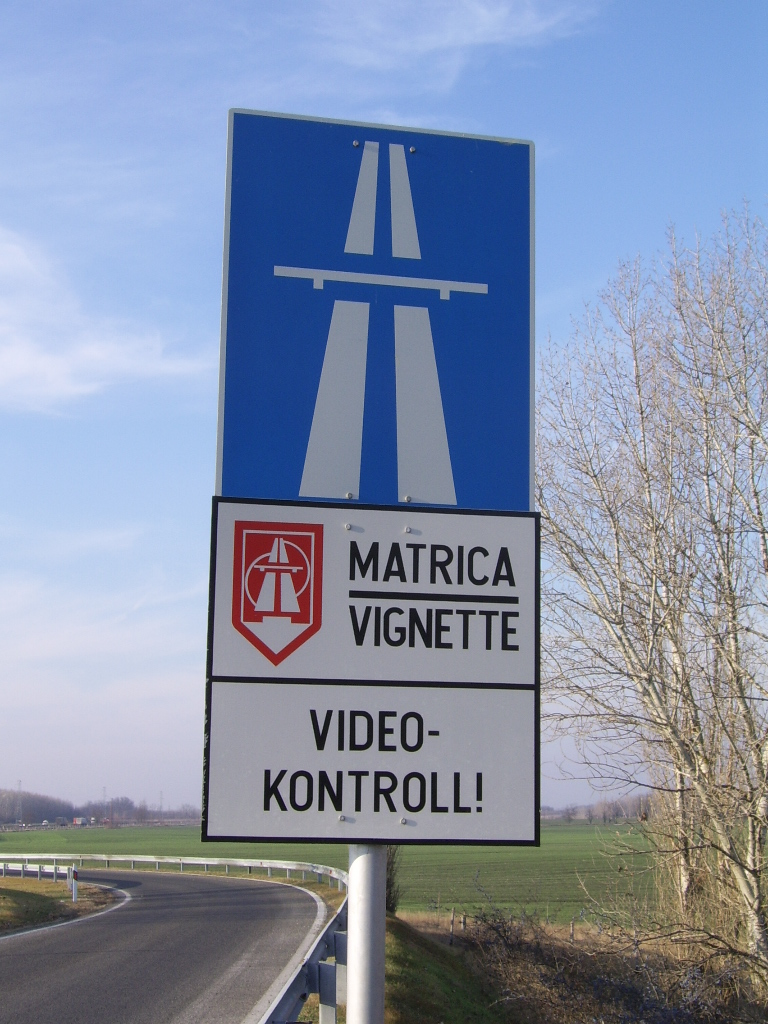
Motorway sign in Hungary. Electronic vignettes are checked by roadside cameras.

Vignettes are required for all vehicles on motorways and expressways. Physical toll stickers were replaced with electronic vignettes and video tolling on 1 January 2008, the only physical item the purchaser receives is a control coupon. Motorway usage entitlement is verified by roadside cameras based on license plate numbers, and drivers of vehicles up to 3.5 tonnes without a valid vignette are charged with cash fines between €50 and €200.

The official website for buying Hungarian e-vignettes is nemzetiutdij.hu.

=== Moldova ===
Vignettes are obligatory for personal motor vehicles registered abroad, driving on public roads, and are available for purchase at border customs posts and offices. Foreign drivers without a valid vignette are charged with cash fines between €125 and €375. Heavier vehicles use existing tax rates, with commercial vehicle drivers paying a single-entry tax and a distance-based charge.

The official website for buying Moldovian e-vignettes is evinieta.gov.md.

=== Montenegro ===
Ecological-tax vignettes were abolished on 31 December 2011. Driving on public roads is generally toll-free, with the exception of passing through certain tunnels and bridges.

=== Romania ===
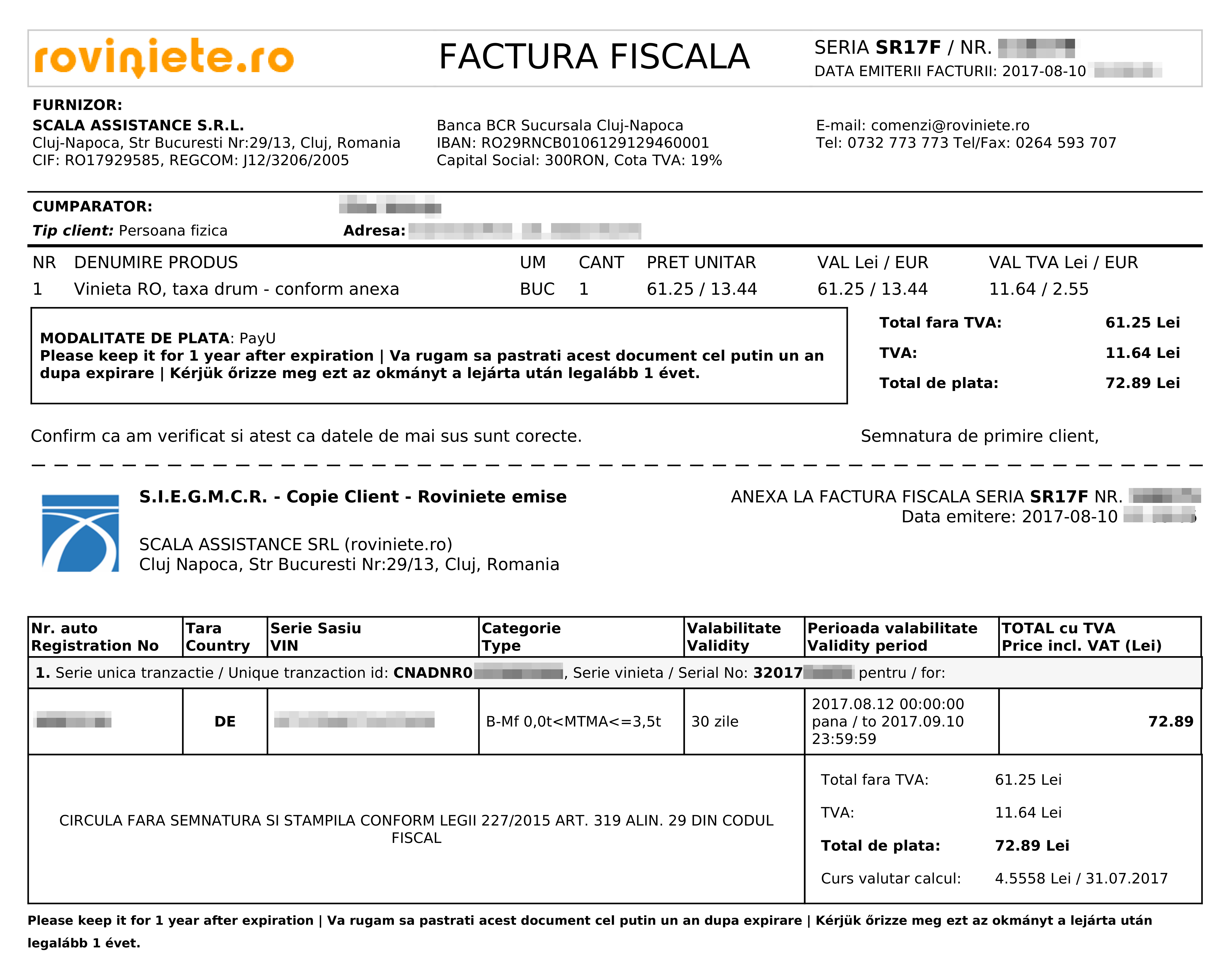
Electronic Vignette Romania 2017

With the exception of motorcycles, vignettes are required for all vehicles driving on all national roads and motorways. Physical vignettes have been replaced with electronic ones since 1 October 2010. They can be obtained at most gas stations, border crossings, or online using a credit card. Drivers without a valid vignette are fined with €100 or more. The fines are dispensed by automatic systems that scan the numberplate of the car when it exits a city.

The official website for buying Romanian vignettes is www.erovinieta.ro.

=== Slovakia ===
Vignettes are obligatory for all vehicles of up to 3.5 tonnes, driving on Slovak motorways. Drivers without a valid vignette are charged with cash fines between €100 and €500. Vignettes for heavier vehicles were replaced with distance-based electronic toll collection using the remote-operated toll-box in force since 2010. Special arrangements are to be sought by the motorbike riders.

From 1 January 2016 Slovak vignettes are purchased and checked electronically via eZnamka.sk without a sticker. As of 1st August 2024, Motorways and expressways that bypass large cities or go through urban areas are exempt from toll payments (Including ring roads such as the D4 around Bratislava), though some exemptions are the Pristavny most (Pristavny bridge) in Bratislava but this is a separate toll that only applies to HGV's over 7.5 tonnes.

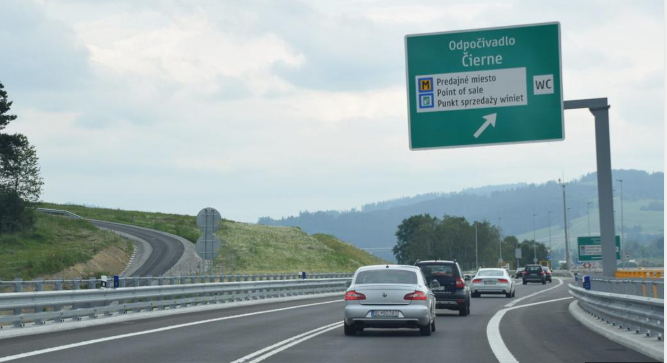
Vignette salespoint on the D3 motorway

=== Slovenia ===
Vignettes are required for all vehicles of up to 3.5 tonnes, driving on Slovenian motorways as of 1 July 2008. Drivers without a valid vignette are charged with cash fines between €300 and €800. On 1.4.2018, Slovenia implemented an electronic tolling of vehicles whose maximum permissible weight exceeds 3.5 tonnes.

From 1 December 2021 Slovenian vignettes are purchased and checked electronically via evinjeta.dars.si without a sticker.

=== Switzerland ===
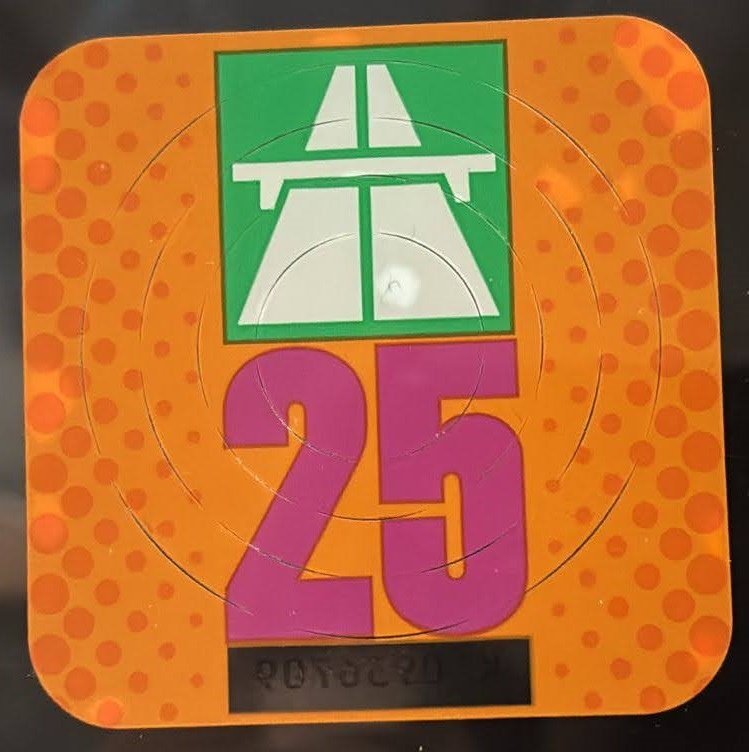
Swiss Vignet 2025

All travelers using motorways and expressways are required to purchase an annual vignette. The vignette was introduced on 1 January 1985, following a successful referendum the previous year: the scheme was originally expected to run for ten years, but it was made permanent by a follow-up referendum in 1994. The vignette sticker was designed by Roland Hirter, and consists of a green motorway symbol and a two-digit year on a coloured background: the e-vignette, introduced on 1 August 2023, was designed by his son Thomas.

Vignettes can be obtained in and outside of Switzerland in bordering countries at gas stations and labeled points. Use of motorway networks without a valid vignette is an offense against the Public Highways Act, and is punishable with cash fines of CHF 200, in addition to the obligatory purchase of an annual vignette. Heavier vehicles use a distance-based tax rate on all types of roads, called the performance-related heavy vehicle charge.

Switzerland only offers a vignette valid for a year (from December of the preceding year to the January of the following year) at CHF 40 (around EUR 43). Because of this, its vignette is the most expensive in Europe for transiting and visiting passenger cars. Other countries offer short-term vignettes that make a transit or visit less expensive than in Switzerland.

The official website for buying Swiss e-vignettes is e-vignette.ch.

=== Other EU countries ===
The official shops for e-vignettes of other european countries or information about them can be found on tolls.eu.

=== United States ===
In many states in the US, a validation sticker, also called "tag", has to be added to the rear license plate.

== See also ==
- Road pricing
- Road tax
- Toll road
- Toll roads in Europe
- Transport economics
- Transport in Europe
