= Toll roads in Europe =

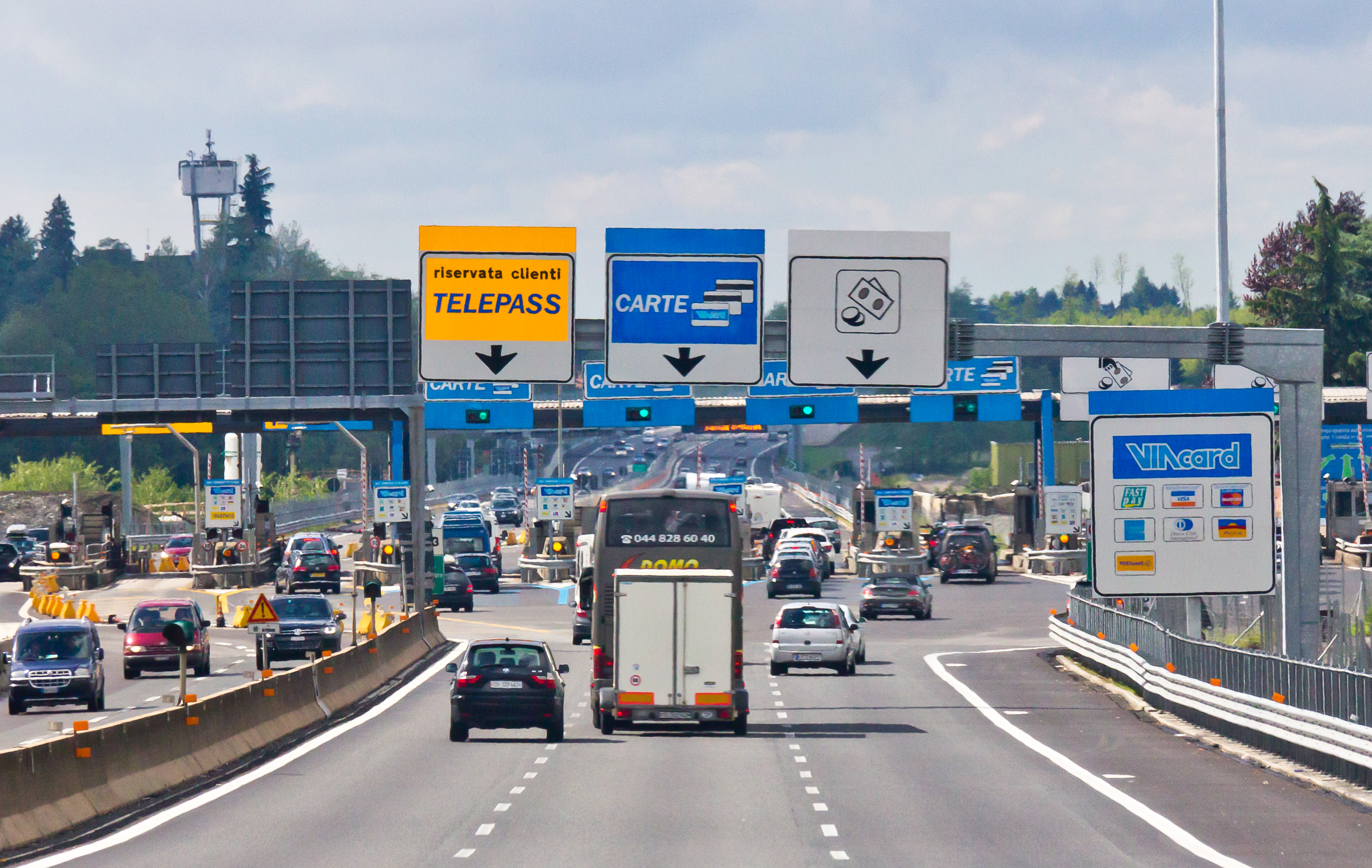
Toll station along the Autostrada A9 in Italy

A toll road is a road over which users may travel over on payment of a toll, or fee. Tolls are a form of use tax that pays for the cost of road construction and maintenance, without raising taxes on non-users. Investor's bonds necessary for the construction of the roads are issued and sold with the expectation that the bonds will be paid back with user tolls. The toll roads may be run by government agencies that have bond issuing authority and/or private companies that sell bonds or have other sources of finance. Toll roads are usually a government guaranteed road monopoly that guarantees limited or no competing roads will be built by government agencies for the duration of the bonds. Private toll roads built with money raised from private investors in expectation of making money from the tolls probably dominated early toll roads. Government sponsored toll roads often guarantee a minimum payment (from other taxes) to the bond holders if traffic volume and toll collections are less than predicted. If the toll authority is a private company there is often a maximum amount of fees that they may extract from users. Toll road operators are typically responsible for maintaining the roads. After the bonds are paid off the road typically reverts to the government agency that authorized the road and owns the land it was built on. Like most government taxes it is not unusual for tolls to continue to be charged after the bonds have been paid off.

== History ==
Many modern European roads were originally constructed as toll roads in order to bring in the costs of construction. Tolls on roads and bridges were very common in England in the 12th century and in the 15th century, schemes for improving particular roads or rivers were granted by acts of Parliament that authorised justices to levy rates for the repair of certain roads. In 1706, a new concept of road tolls was introduced in England: the turnpike trusts. The turnpike trusts were authorised to erect gates, collect tolls, appoint surveyors and collectors, demand statute labour or its monetary equivalent, mortgage the tolls, elect new trustees, and undertake work necessary for repairing the roads. By 1750, most of the main roads between London and the provincial centres and some inter-provincial routes had been turnpiked. By the mid-1830s, over 1000 turnpike trusts controlled 35,000 km of main roads and disposed about 1.5 million pounds of toll receipts each year. However, the rise of railway transport largely halted the road improving schemes of the turnpike trusts, and from the 1870s, the Parliament stopped renewing the acts and roads began to revert to local authorities; toll roads passed out of fashion until the later 19th century.

In the 20th century, road tolls have been introduced for financing the construction of motorway networks and specific road infrastructure such as bridges and tunnels. Italy has been the first European country to apply the use of motorway tolls on a 50 km motorway section near Milan in 1924. It was followed by Greece, which made users to pay for the network of motorways around and between its cities in 1927. Later in the 1950s and 1960s, also France, Spain and Portugal started to build motorways largely with the aid of concessions, allowing rapid development of this infrastructure without massive State debts. Since then, road tolls have been introduced in the majority of the EU Member States.

Road tolling has been a topic on the European Community level since the 1960s, when the Council published the Council Decision No. 64/389/EEC in order to collect data to serve as a basis for the establishment of a system of charging for the use of infrastructure under the common transport policy.

However, the focus of the European Commission has rather been on lorries than on private cars, as lorries are concerned directly by the internal market. But it was only in the end of the last century, that the legal basis for road tolling was established in Directive 1999/62/EC ("Eurovignette") on European Community level. This Directive had the focus on the tolling of motorways, bridges, tunnels and mountain passes, but only for lorries over 12 tonnes maximum laden weight, and the charging was only possible for infrastructure costs. Eight years later in 2006, the Directive was amended by Directive 2006/38/EC, which has a new focus on road tolling of the trans-European road network, but leaves the EU Member States the right to apply tolls as well on roads not included in the trans-European road network. The amended Directive gives the EU Member States the possibility of varying tolls according to a number of factors such as distance travelled, place, infrastructure type and speed, vehicle characteristics, time of day and congestion level. In addition, the EU Member States are obliged to include all vehicles over 3.5 tonnes maximum laden weight after 2012, and after 2010, the tolls must be differentiated according to the environmental performance of the vehicle. Recently, the European Commission proposed a new, second amendment to the Directive 1999/62/EC, enabling EU Member States to integrate the cost of air and noise pollution caused by traffic in tolls levied on heavy goods vehicles and allowing tolls to be calculated on the basis of the cost of congestion imposed upon other vehicles during peak periods.

== Specialised system provisions ==
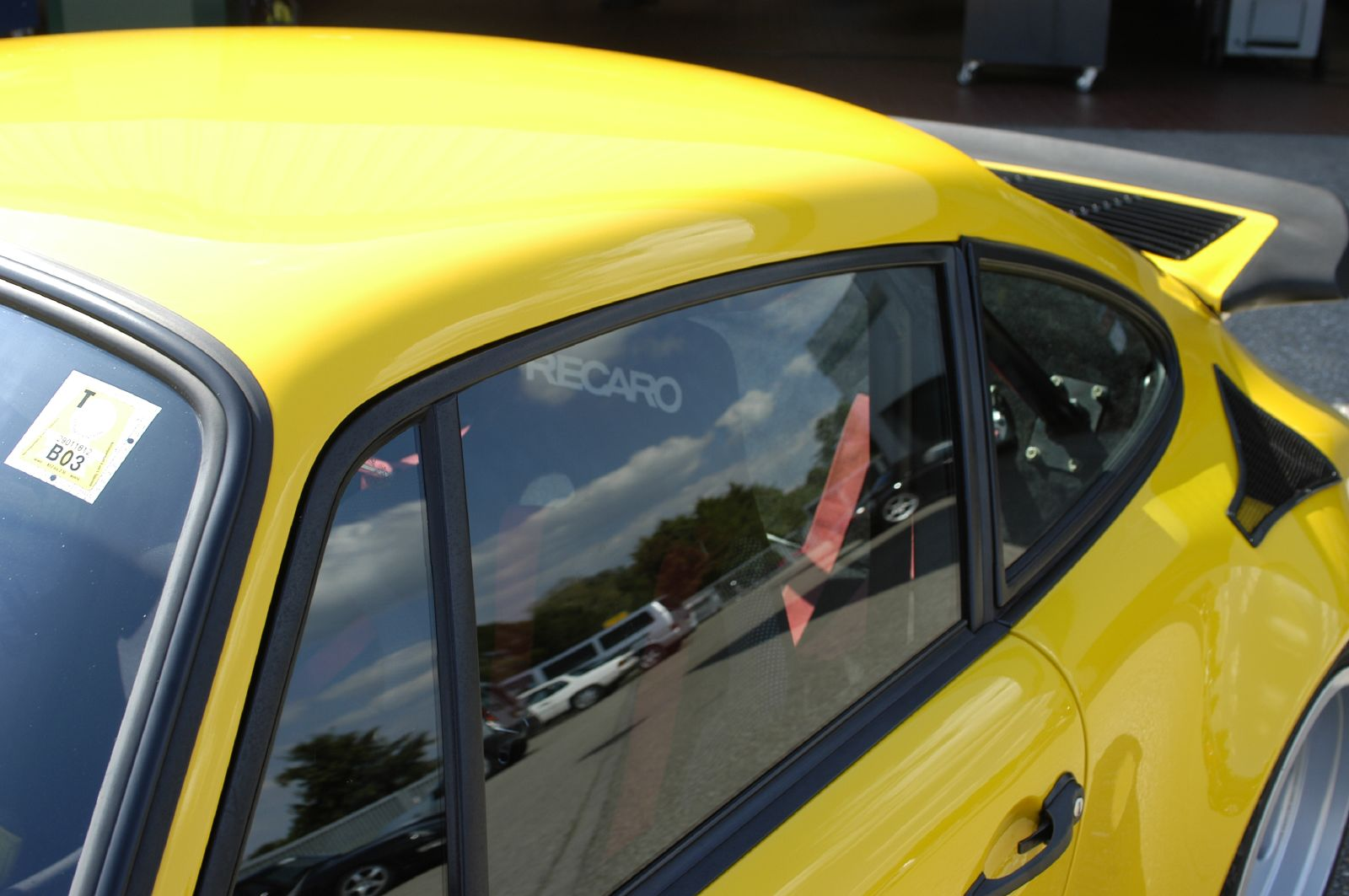
Austrian toll sticker on windshield

=== Toll stickers ===
Several European countries have toll road payment done in the form of toll stickers affixed to the car's front window, which are valid for a certain amount of time.

=== Toll collection for lorries ===
- Switzerland introduced a toll-system for HGVs over 3.5 tonnes in January 2001, and
- Austria introduced an electronic toll collection system for lorries over 3.5 tonnes in January 2004, based on DSRC micro wave technology.
- Germany followed suit with a toll system for lorries over 12 tonnes, with some delay due to organisational and technical problems on 1 January 2005. The German Toll Collect system is based on a technology using satellites; lorry operators may choose to either install on-board units for automated tracking of movements, or to book their route in advance using the internet or computerised booking terminals. The toll is valid for lorries or HGVs over 12 tonnes. On 1 October 2015, the toll will be extended to lorries over 7.5 tonnes.
- Hungary installed the e-toll system for lorries over 3.5 tonnes on 1 July 2013.
- Lithuanian highways A1-A18 have a toll system for all vans, lorries and buses.
- On 1 July 2014, Latvia introduced a toll system for all lorries over 3.5 tons on highways A1-A15.

== Particular countries ==
=== Austria ===
As of 2017, a twelve-month sticker for private cars and motorhomes up to 3.5t is EURO 86.40 and for motorcycles EURO 34.40. A two-month sticker for private cars and motorhomes up to 3.5t is EURO 25.90 and for motorcycles EURO 13.00. A 10-day sticker for private cars and motorhomes up to 3.5t is EURO 8.90 and for motorcycles EURO 5.10.

=== Belarus ===
Major highways in Belarus are toll roads with Open road tolling (ORT) or free-flow tolling. BelToll is an electronic toll collection system (ETC), valid from 1 July 2013 in the Republic of Belarus.

=== Bulgaria ===
All vehicles using roads in Bulgaria must have a vignette sticker. It is obligatory for almost all national roads in Bulgaria, not only for highways. 2017 Price for annual sticker (valid from January 1 to January 31 next year regardless date of purchase) for vehicles under 3.5 t is 97 BGN. There's stickers for a month (30 BGN) and for a week (15 BGN).

In April 2016 Bulgaria launched a tender for implementation of an electronic toll collection system for vehicles heavier than 3.5 tonnes for all roads.

=== Czech Republic ===
2024 prices for vehicles under 3.5 tonnes:

Annual (R): CZK 2,300 Starts on the day chosen during the online purchase and expires at the end of the 365-th calendar day.

Month (M): CZK 430 Starts on the day chosen during the online purchase and expires at the end of the same day as chosen in the immediately following month.

10-day (D): CZK 270 Starts on the day chosen during the online purchase and expires at the end of the tenth calendar day.

One day (J): CZK 200 Valid for one day chosen during the online purchase.

=== Croatia ===
Croatian motorways are generally toll roads and most of these use networked closed toll collection system, meaning the driver receives a ticket upon entering the network and pays the toll upon exiting. Toll is paid in proportion to the length of the used section and according to the corresponding vehicle group. The first motorway, today's A1 section between Zagreb and Karlovac, was opened in 1972. As of 2020 there are 1,306.5 km (811.8 mi) of tolled highways in Croatia, operated by three motorway concessionaire companies, notably the state-owned Hrvatske autoceste (HAC). As a cash and credit card alternative, all highway concession companies offer paying the toll via electronic toll collection (ETC) or Smart card prepaid toll card.

Croatia also has a considerable network of other motorways, including some grade-separated expressways and major state routes, but they are by and large not tolled.

=== Denmark ===
The Great Belt Fixed Link and the Øresund Bridge are toll roads.

In the Faroe Islands, the inter-island road tunnels Vágatunnilin, Norðoyatunnilin, Eysturoyartunnilin and Sandoyartunnilin have tolls (but no physical toll booths are present and the toll must be paid at nearby petrol stations).

=== Finland ===
In Finland there are no toll roads or toll bridges, which is mainly because constructing and maintaining roads is funded by Finnish taxes.

=== Germany ===
Autobahns are totally free (Court of Justice of the European Union verdict).

=== Greece ===
Greece has 2133 kilometers of motorway (Greek: Αυτοκινητόδρομοι) toll roads:

- Attiki Odos
- Moreas
- Αegean Motorway
- Nea Odos
- Kentriki Odos
- Egnatia Odos
- "Charilaos Trikoupis" Rion-Antirion Bridge.

=== Hungary ===
In Hungary every motorway is a toll road, administered by the National Toll Payment Services (NÚSZ Zrt.). The roads M0 (that forms a half ring around the city of Budapest), M2 and M15 although are divided multilane roads, most sections can be used only with a sticker. A detailed map is available, showing toll roads in red and toll-exempt sections of the motorway network.

Since the beginning of 2008, the purchase of a motorway sticker is handled electronically (known as an "e-sticker" or e-matrica), thus cannot be put physically on the windshield anymore, it is only registered in a computer system with its validity period. The highway cameras are checking the registered plate number and not the sticker itself. The 10 days, monthly and yearly stickers can be used for unlimited trips on every highway, within its validity period.

The highway stickers can be purchased or registered online or at petrol stations (gas stations) all around the country. The purchase receipts should be kept for at least half a year after the trip.

=== Iceland ===
The Hvalfjörður Tunnel was once tolled, but is toll free as of 28 September 2018.

=== Ireland ===
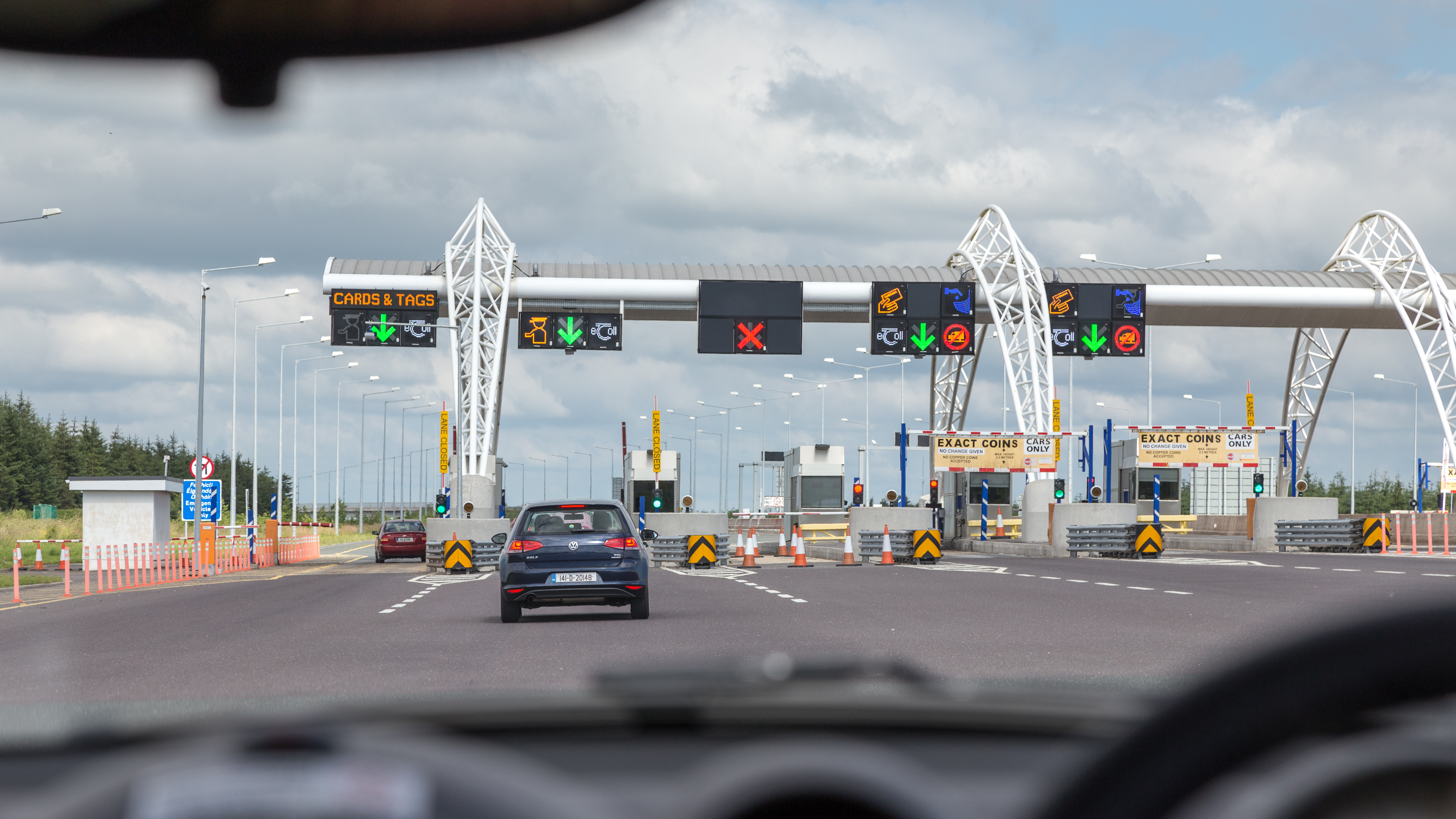
Toll plaza on the M4 motorway

In Ireland there are eleven tolled road-transport schemes, operated by various independent operators. The majority of these are tolls on a major bridge or tunnel on the route. All tolled roads in the Republic were built under a public-private partnership system, giving the company which arranged for the road to be built the right to collect tolls for a defined period. Tolls vary from €1.65 to €12 for cars. Larger vehicles pay more, with the exception of the Dublin Port Tunnel, where buses and heavy goods vehicles travel toll-free.

=== Italy ===
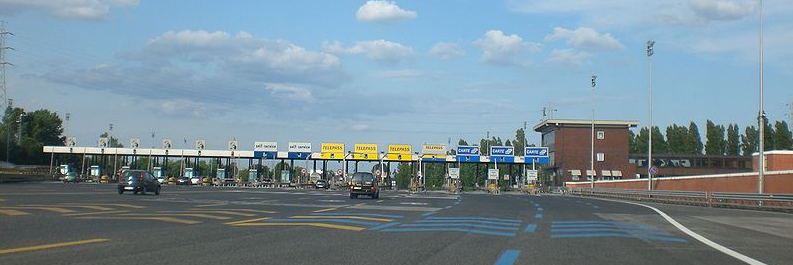
Toll plaza along the Autostrada A57

In Italy the only toll roads are the autostrade (Italian for motorways). Major exceptions are the beltways around some larger cities (tangenziali) which are not part of a thoroughfare motorway, and the section of the A3 motorway between Salerno and Reggio di Calabria which is operated by the government-owned ANAS. Both are toll free.

On Italian motorways, the toll applies to almost all motorways not managed by Anas. The collection of motorway tolls, from a tariff point of view, is managed mainly in two ways: either through the "closed motorway system" (km travelled) or through the "open motorway system" (flat-rate toll).

Given the multiplicity of operators, the toll is only requested when exiting the motorway and not when the motorway operator changes. This system was made possible following article 14 of law 531 of 12 August 1982.

From a technical point of view, however, the mixed barrier/free-flow system is active where, at the entrance and exit from the motorways, there are lanes dedicated to the collection of a ticket (on entry) and the delivery of the ticket with simultaneous payment (on exit) and other lanes where, during transit without the need to stop, an electronic toll system present in the vehicles records the data and debits the toll, generally into the bank account previously communicated by the customer, to the manager of his device. In Italy, this occurs through the Autostrade per l'Italia interchange system.

The Autostrada A36, Autostrada A59 and Autostrada A60 are exclusively free-flow. On these motorways, those who do not have the electronic toll device on board must proceed with the payment by subsequently communicating the data to the motorway manager (by telephone, online or by going to the offices dedicated to payment).

The closed motorway system is applied to most Italian motorways. It requires the driver of the vehicle to collect a special ticket at the entrance to the motorway and pay the amount due upon exit. If equipped with an electronic toll system the two procedures are completely automatic and the driver on the detection lanes located at the entrances and exits from the motorways subject to toll payment must only proceed at a maximum speed of 30 kilometres per hour (20 mph) without the need to stop. The amount is directly proportional to the distance travelled by the vehicle, the coefficient of its class and a variable coefficient from motorway to motorway, called the kilometre rate.

Unlike the closed motorway system, in the open system, the road user does not pay based on the distance travelled. Motorway barriers are arranged along the route (however not at every junction), at which the user pays a fixed sum, depending only on the class of the vehicle. The user can therefore travel along sections of the motorway without paying any toll as the barriers may not be present on the section travelled.

=== North Macedonia ===
Highways in North Macedonia which have been upgraded to avtopat standard are toll roads and they use a ticket system.

=== Norway ===
Norwegian toll road sign

Norway has a sixty-year experience in road tolling for financing bridges, tunnels and roads. Until the beginning of the 1980s contributions of tolls to the road building budget stagnated at about 5%, since then it has soared to more than 25% in 2000. Those twenty years were marked by the advance of road tolling in urban areas.

Norwegian authorities closely monitored Singapore's use of tolls as a means to discourage urban traffic and Bergen got its first toll zone outside the ring road on 1 February 1986. Any driver wishing to enter central Bergen by car had to pay the fee. In difference to the project in Singapore, the tolls in Norway are by law not meant as a means for regulating traffic but rather only as one for generating income to be invested in infrastructure. The lack of general protest and high income from such toll zones made them very popular initially and today toll rings circumscribe Oslo, Stavanger, Tønsberg, Namsos and Kristiansand. The toll ring in Trondheim was closed December 30, 2005 after 14 years in operation. However, after voters elected a socialist city council it was reintroduced in 2014 – though there is a slight possibility entering the city from the west where few people reside, via a major detour. Toll roads around major cities are permanent, financing to a large extent non-road related infrastructure, like subsidizing subways or bike paths. While in rural areas they are normally of temporary nature to finance the building of the road. Often tolls are introduced on old roads, before the new roads are built – especially in the Oslo region.

There are also several toll roads to finance road infrastructure and highways in other parts of Norway. An example of successful use is the bridge over lake Mjøsa which is now free of charge. A map of all public toll roads in Norway are available on the Autopass website. The site also allows payment after passing a toll without the normal electronic badge. The Brobizz badge from Denmark works in Norway's Autopass system.

=== Poland ===
Only highways in Poland levy charges on vehicles. There are two systems: open and closed (see: Toll Roads). A toll systems operate on the following highways:

- A1—only section Gdańsk—Toruń is payable
- A2—section between Rzepin and Poznań and section Poznań—Konin
- A4—section Katowice—Kraków

A toll is collected electronically from vans, trucks and buses. All other highways are free of charge as they do not meet all present-day requirements or are parts of Ring roads.

=== Portugal ===
In Portugal a certain number of roads are designated Toll-Roads. They charge a fixed value per kilometre distance, with several classes depending on vehicle type and regulated by the government. Several authorised franchises run them, the largest at present being BRISA. Other operators are AEA, Ascendi and Lusoponte.

Some motorways operate a cash-free Via Verde system (Portuguese for Green Way) which is an electronic tag that is fitted to vehicles and automatically debits an associated bank-account with the cost of the journey made. To use these motorways foreign cars will need to buy a pre-paid pass, for 3 or 5 days or link their bank account to the system or buy a pre-paid toll card that uses a text message to link it to your vehicle registration number.

Well-known roads are the A1, which goes from Lisbon to Porto and the A2, from Almada to the Algarve, or the A6, from the A2 at Marateca to the Spanish border, close to Badajoz.

=== Russia ===
A number of toll roads in Barnaul and Pskov Region (Nevil-Velezh (RUR 190 ($2.8)), Pechori-state border RUR 140($2.1)), also M4-Don (18 km close to Lipetsk costs RUR20($0.3) for cars and RUR40 ($0.6) for trucks).

Ordinary speed limits apply so far. In 2007 adopted Toll Road Law and Concession Law in 2005 to develop this sector.

=== Spain ===
Spanish toll roads (or autopistas) are designated AP-XX (where XX is the number of the road) as opposed to State-maintained dual carriage-ways (or autovías), called A-XX. Most of them are networked, so a ticket is issued on entering and the fee is paid when leaving the road. Technically, all the roads belong to the Government, although autopistas are built and maintained by private companies under a State concession; when the concession expires, the road reverts to State ownership, although most of them are renewed.

There are some autovías which are built and maintained by private companies, notably the Pamplona-Logroño autovía A-12; the company assumes the building costs and the Autonomous Community where they are located (in the given example, Navarre) pays a yearly per-vehicle fee to the company based upon usage statistics, called "toll in the shadow" (in Spanish, peaje en la sombra). The system can be regarded as a way for the Government to finance the build of new roads at the expense of the building company. Also, since the payment starts only after the road is finished, construction delays are usually shorter than those of regular state-owned dual carriage-ways.

=== Sweden ===
Swedish toll road sign

Tolls were established for the border-crossing The Oresund Bridge (opened 2000, no plans to end tolls) and Svinesund Bridge (opened 2003, tolls ended 2021). Domestic active toll bridges are the Sundsvall Bridge (opened 2014), Motala Bridge (opened 2015) and Skuru Bridge (opened 2023). Before year 2000 road tolls did not exist in Sweden for several decades.

The Stockholm congestion tax was introduced in 2006 to reduce traffic congestion in Stockholm during peak hours. Later in 2013 the Gothenburg congestion tax was also introduced. There are no toll-booths. Instead, vehicles passing into or out of central Stockholm or Gothenburg between 06:00 and 18:30 on weekdays are identified by an automatic number plate recognition system and the owners of applicable vehicles are billed on a monthly basis.

=== Switzerland ===
Switzerland uses a Vignette system similar to Austria for private vehicles. All domestic and foreign users of motorways need to purchase such a sticker and put it on the windshield according to instructions. Only an annual sticker is available, which currently costs CHF 40, (around 34 Euros as of 20.11.2017) and allows for unlimited travel on the motorway network of the country during the calendar year. The sticker can be purchased at gas stations along the border and other convenience shops in the country. Use of motorway networks without a valid vignette is an offense against the Public Highways Act, and is punishable with cash fines of CHF 200 or more, in addition to the obligatory purchase of an annual vignette.

As for trucks and lorries a performance-related heavy vehicle fee (HVF) was introduced in Switzerland on 1 January 2001. This fee replaces the flat-rate heavy vehicle charge that had been levied since 1985 and is based on a law approved by a clear majority of the electorate in September 1998.

The HVF must be paid on all Swiss and foreign vehicles (i.e. those registered outside Switzerland) used for freight transport whose total maximum permitted weight exceeds 3.5 tonnes. It is levied on all public roads in Switzerland.

The amount charged is based on the mileage covered, the total maximum permitted weight and the emission rating (Euro class) of the vehicle in question.

The mileage covered within Switzerland is read off the tachograph that is fitted in almost all vehicles which are subject to the fee. A fee is not charged separately for trailers but in conjunction with the tractor unit. In this case, the rate is calculated according to tariffs for maximum permitted weight on Swiss roads. This maximum permitted weight may be lower than the sum of the maximum total weight of the tractor unit and the trailer since it depends on the type of tractor unit and is subject to the general national weight limit. The national weight limit is 40 tonnes.

The person who is liable for the fee has at the same time a duty to cooperate. Swiss transport companies regularly declare the mileage covered by their vehicles to the Directorate General of Customs. In the case of foreign vehicles, the mileage is automatically declared at the customs post upon leaving Switzerland. The fee is then either paid direct when the driver leaves the country or charged to an account in the transport company's name.

The owner of the vehicle (and in the case of foreign vehicles the driver too) is responsible for ensuring that the declaration made is correct. Equally, he is responsible for ensuring that the recording device is in good working order. This is also part of the principle of obligatory cooperation on the part of persons who are subject to the fee.

No distance-related fee is levied on heavy vehicles used to transport passengers, i.e. buses and coaches, for which a flat-rate charge is levied. Certain vehicles (military vehicles, police vehicles, fire brigade vehicles, etc.) are exempt from the fee.

The system for levying HVF is implemented by the customs administration in conjunction with cantonal highways offices, transport companies and authorised assembly points.

The Swiss authorities invested some CHF 290 million to set up the HVF system. This sum included development (toll system, recording device, etc.), procuring and installing the necessary roadside infrastructure (beacons and associated equipment) and procuring the recording devices.

The annual cost of operation, maintenance and additional staff constitutes around 7–8% of the total, which is relatively low in comparison with other electronic toll systems.

=== Turkey ===
In Turkey, a toll is collected on certain highways, the so-called Otoyol or Otoban. The beltways around major cities (çevreyolu), even though they are classified as highways are generally toll-free. Payment for toll-road has been done by three different systems. Historically, three methods of payment have been used. The KGS method (Turkish: Kartlı Geçiş Sistemi; English: Card passage system) required a prepaid card to be presented at the tollgate, although this system was later removed in January 2013. The OGS (Turkish: Otomatik Geçiş Sistemi; English: Automatic passage system), and later HGS (Turkish: Hızlı Geçiş Sistemi; English: Fast passage system) (the former of which was retired in 2021) method uses a RFID chip stuck to the windshield of the vehicle. This chip is scanned automatically when passing the toll collecting point and the fee is automatically withdrawn from the connected bank account. Bypassing the toll system results with a fine to the registered postal home address of the vehicle.

Toll fees can vary greatly on Turkish highways, depending on how they were built and are operated. While the Istanbul-Ankara highway, built during the 1980s and is fully state-owned will cost 30,00 TL to travel one direction, the newly built and privately operated Istanbul-Izmir highway will cost 367,00 TL for passengers vehicles as of September 2021. Similarly, the intercontinental Bosphorus crossings over Istanbul's two suspension bridges (the Bosphorus Bridge and the Fatih Sultan Mehmet Bridge) costs 13,35 TL, while the newly built Çanakkale 1915 Bridge over the Dardanelles Strait is expected to cost over 150,00 TL.

=== United Kingdom ===
In the 18th century and 19th century most main roads in Great Britain were managed as toll roads, by turnpike trusts, but these were gradually abolished in the 1860s and 1870s.

As a result, until recently, the only tolls on roads in the United Kingdom were mainly tolled bridges and tunnels at estuaries (e.g. Humber Bridge, Severn crossing, Mersey Tunnels and Tyne Tunnel) and some small, privately owned toll roads and bridges (for example, in Dulwich College).

The recently built and privately financed M6 Toll, opened in 2003, is potentially the first of a new generation of toll roads.

There are three places in the UK with congestion charges; London has the peak-time London congestion charge, Durham has a similar charge on a much smaller scale and in 2002 a congestion charge was implemented on the Dartford Crossing.

In principle, UK roads today are maintained from general taxation, some of which is raised from motoring taxes including fuel duty and vehicle excise duty.

== See also ==
- Toll road
- Electronic toll collection
  - TELEPASS (Italy)
- High-occupancy toll lane
- Freeway
- List of toll roads
- London congestion charge
- Private highway
- Road pricing
- Toll bridge
- Turnpike trusts the first organisations empowered to collect tolls on English roads
- Road Transport
- Vignette (road tax)
