= LKW-Maut =

Road sign for toll road for heavy trucks

The HGV toll (German: LKW-Maut) is the tolling scheme for heavy goods vehicles (Lastkraftwagen in German) traversing Autobahn road usage with trucks. Charges are based on the distance driven in kilometres, the emission category of the vehicle and the number of axles.

== Overview ==
As much as 35% of truck miles travelled on Autobahns are generated by foreign lorries. Facing increased pressure from freight traffic passing through and needing an additional source of revenue for motorway maintenance and expansion, in January 2005 Germany implemented a distance-based toll for all lorries of more than twelve tonnes gross weight (later reduced to 7.5 tonnes, and 2024 it was reduced further to 3.5 tonnes for freight transport vehicles) using the motorways (Autobahnen). The motorway freight tolling was authorized by the Motorway Toll Act for Heavy Goods Vehicles (introduced on 12 April 2002) and the Toll Regulation (Toll Collect, 2007).

== Administration ==
The toll is based on the route and the pollution class of the vehicle, its weight and the number of axles. Certain vehicles, such as emergency vehicles and buses, are exempt from the toll. An average user is charged € 0.15 per kilometre, or about $0.31 per mile (Toll Collect, 2007).

=== Automatic log-on ===
Toll Collect oversees the toll collection on behalf of the Federal Republic of Germany (Toll Collect, 2007). Toll Collect has developed an automatic log-on system for truckers, based on a combination of GSM and GPS. To take advantage of the automatic log-on, lorry drivers are required to register the freight company as well as each individual lorry. After registration an on-board unit (OBU) can be installed by an authorized Toll-Collect partner. The OBU automatically determines the distance travelled on the toll route, calculates the toll based on vehicle class and toll rate information entered and transmits the information to the Toll-Collect centre for processing via GSM (cellular) communication (Richards, 2006). Once the toll information has been submitted to the Toll-Collect centre a bill is generated and e-mailed to the driver or owner of the lorry. The German government paid for the approximately 450,000 OBUs currently in use and lorry drivers were responsible for covering their installation (UK Commission for Integrated Transport 2007).

=== Manual log-on ===
Alternatively lorry drivers who rarely use German toll roads can log-on manually at one of 3,500 toll station terminals or over the internet. The log-on to a toll station terminal, located near motorway access ramps, is similar to purchasing a ticket. The driver enters the vehicle information, starting point and destination. The toll station calculates the fees based on the shortest route within the toll road network. As of December 2006 90% of the lorries on German roads paid the toll automatically. In 2006 the toll-collection rate for automatic transactions was 99.75% (Toll Collect, 2007).

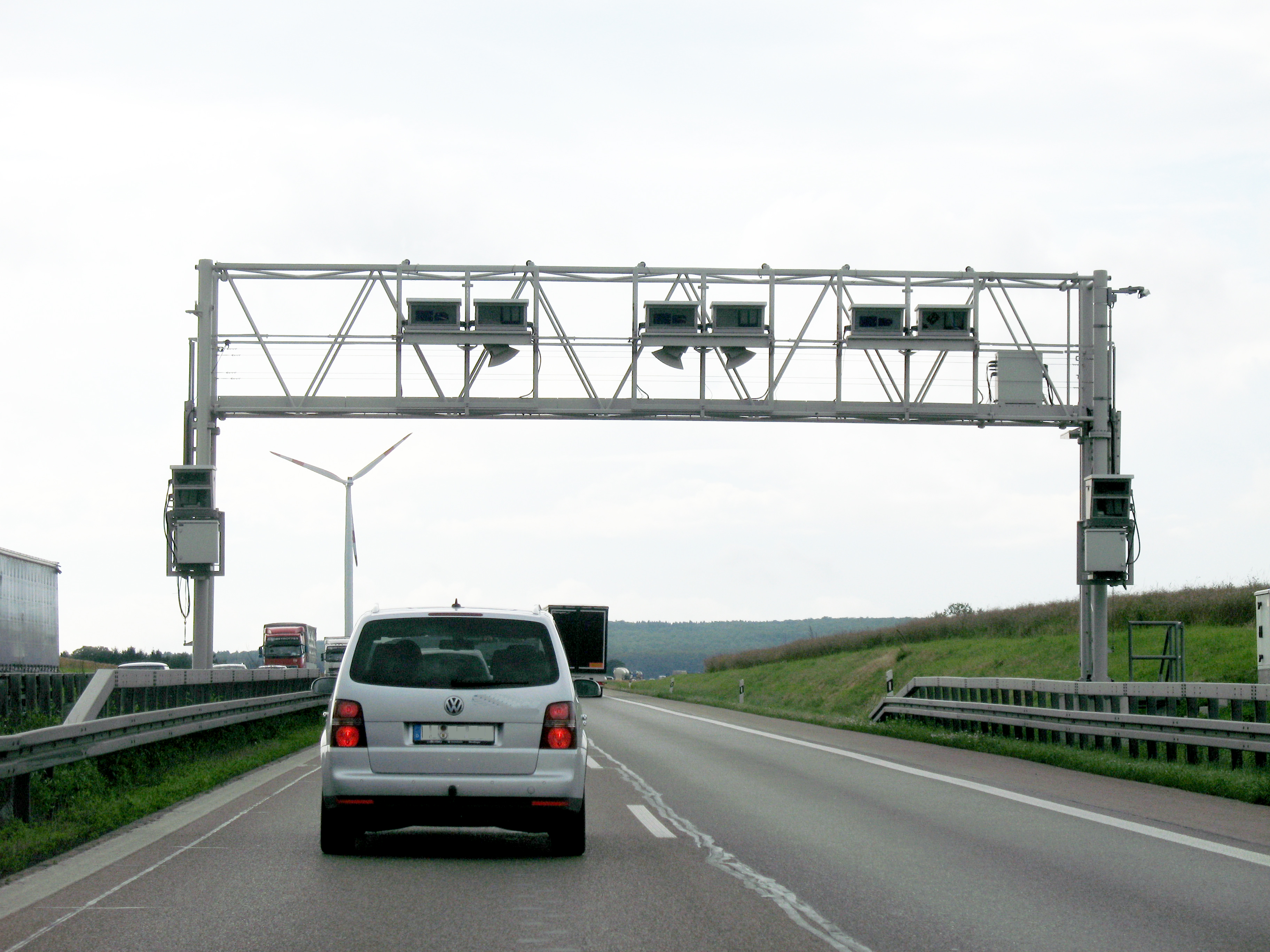
Toll-collect gantry on the A65

== Enforcement ==
The system enforcement is based on 300 gantries equipped with infrared detection equipment and high-resolution cameras (able to identify the license plates of lorries). Owing to the large volume of data generated by these gantries, not all of the gantries installed are in operation at the same time. Only selected gantries are in operation and able to identify vehicles for which the toll has not been paid. In addition Federal Officers of Freight in 300 mobile enforcement vehicles patrol the motorways and are authorized to pull lorries over and check for payment records. If a fee has not been paid and the GPS data is unclear a charge for 500 km of travel is imposed. The collection costs are estimated at 20 per cent of gross revenues. During the first eight months of operation of the scheme 11.6 million lorries were checked for violation, with a resulting violation rate of less than 2% (Richards, 2006; UK Commission for Integrated Transport, 2007).

== Results ==
Toll revenues in excess of system operating costs provide funding for transport infrastructure improvements (Richards, 2006). The scheme has provided freight companies with an incentive to purchase vehicles with lower emission rates. The UK Commission for Integrated Transport (2007) cites a 6% decrease in the number of empty runs and a 6% shift to rail from road freight mode as a result of implementing the system. Those factors are likely to lower the emissions of carbon dioxide and other pollutants on German roads. The only negative consequence of the freight toll system detected thus far has been the rerouting of some trucks off the motorways onto other roads, resulting in additional noise and congestion on those routes.

== See also ==
- Congestion pricing
- Electronic toll collection
- Road pricing
- Toll Collect
