= Toll Collect =

German road toll company

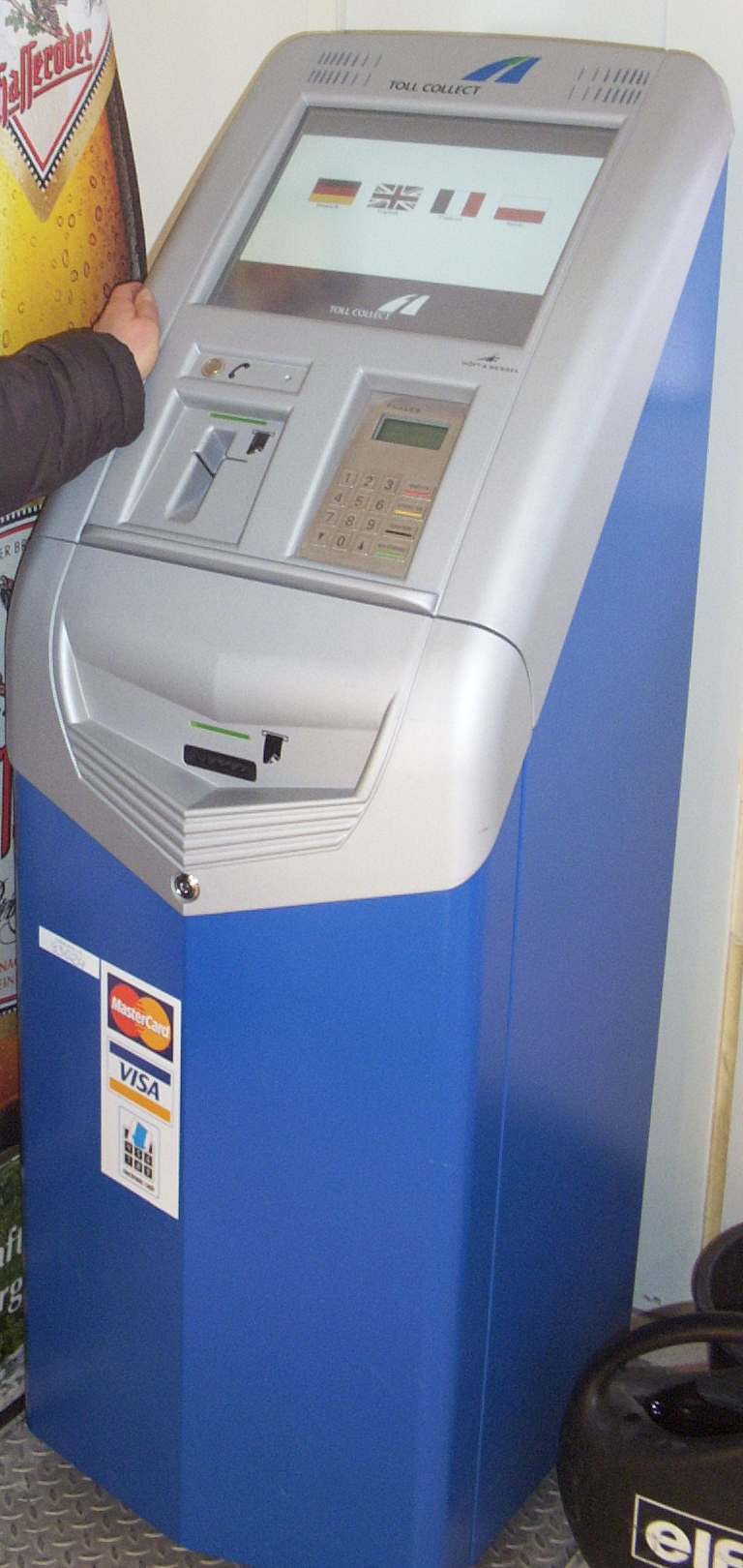
Truckers without electronic billing units use a Toll Collect terminal to select a route and pay the appropriate toll.

Toll Collect GmbH is a German company that has developed and is running the tolling system for trucks (LKW-Maut) on German motorways.

The company was a consortium led by Daimler AG, Deutsche Telekom, and Cofiroute until 2018 when it was taken over by German Government. The consortium won a bid for the development of a toll billing system from the German government. The development of the system started in September 2002. The technology is based on the Global Positioning System, and a web application for booking truck routes in advance. Trucks are equipped with embedded systems called "On Board Units" (OBUs). OBUs are used for positioning, monitoring and billing. Additionally, the OBUs have infrared and Dedicated short-range communications (DSRC) interfaces for exchanging data with stationary enforcement gantries and mobile enforcement on the tolled road network.

Since the end of 2002 several hundred engineers and programmers worked on the project. Articles report more than 1000 experts were involved in the project. The rollout was first scheduled for the end of August 2003, but was delayed repeatedly, causing the government to forfeit toll collection on trucks using the Autobahn. The deadline was first shifted by 2 months, then by at least one year. Not until the German government purchased Toll Collect were the long-lasting disputes between Toll Collect and the German government about the payment of damages due to the long delay in the launching system resolved. There were also accusations that during the tendering procedure for the system, the offers made by non-German companies were not given fair consideration.

The system was opened two years behind schedule on January 1, 2005. It was the first system in the world that deployed a national GNSS road pricing scheme. The charge per kilometre varies according to the number of axles and the vehicle's emission category, and is between 9 and 14 cents per kilometre. For a trip from Hamburg to Munich (776 km) for example, the costs lie between €69.84 and €108.64. Since the installation of an On Board Unit (OBU) by a professional service is costly and/or time-consuming, the option of paying for a specific trip tickets was also provided from the very beginning (as illustrated).

In publications from December 2019, however, journalists attributed Toll Collect's whereabouts to the federal government to the contracts signed by Transport Minister Andreas Scheuer with industry representatives on the failed car toll in December 2018 and also critically assessed the role of the State Secretary and later Toll Collect boss Gerhard Schulz . According to this, the provision of parts of the Toll Collect infrastructure was probably already assured to Scheuer's contractual partners at the time before the bidding process for the Toll Collect privatization was officially ended in January 2019.

== Technical background of the satellite based toll system ==
Generally, for any truck travelling on the German motorways, the distance-based fees can be paid by different means: through the advance purchase of a specific route via the internet or at payment terminals (typically located in fuel stations), or fully automated through the use of OBUs that are professionally installed in the trucks. Through the use of satellite navigation, the position and the trip are data stored in the OBU which enable the device to determine the tolling fees that apply for the route driven. The data collected in the OBU are transferred to the data center by mobile data communication (GSM), and processed for billing. The fact that the system is "satellite based" relates to the positioning only, not to the communication of the OBU to the data center.

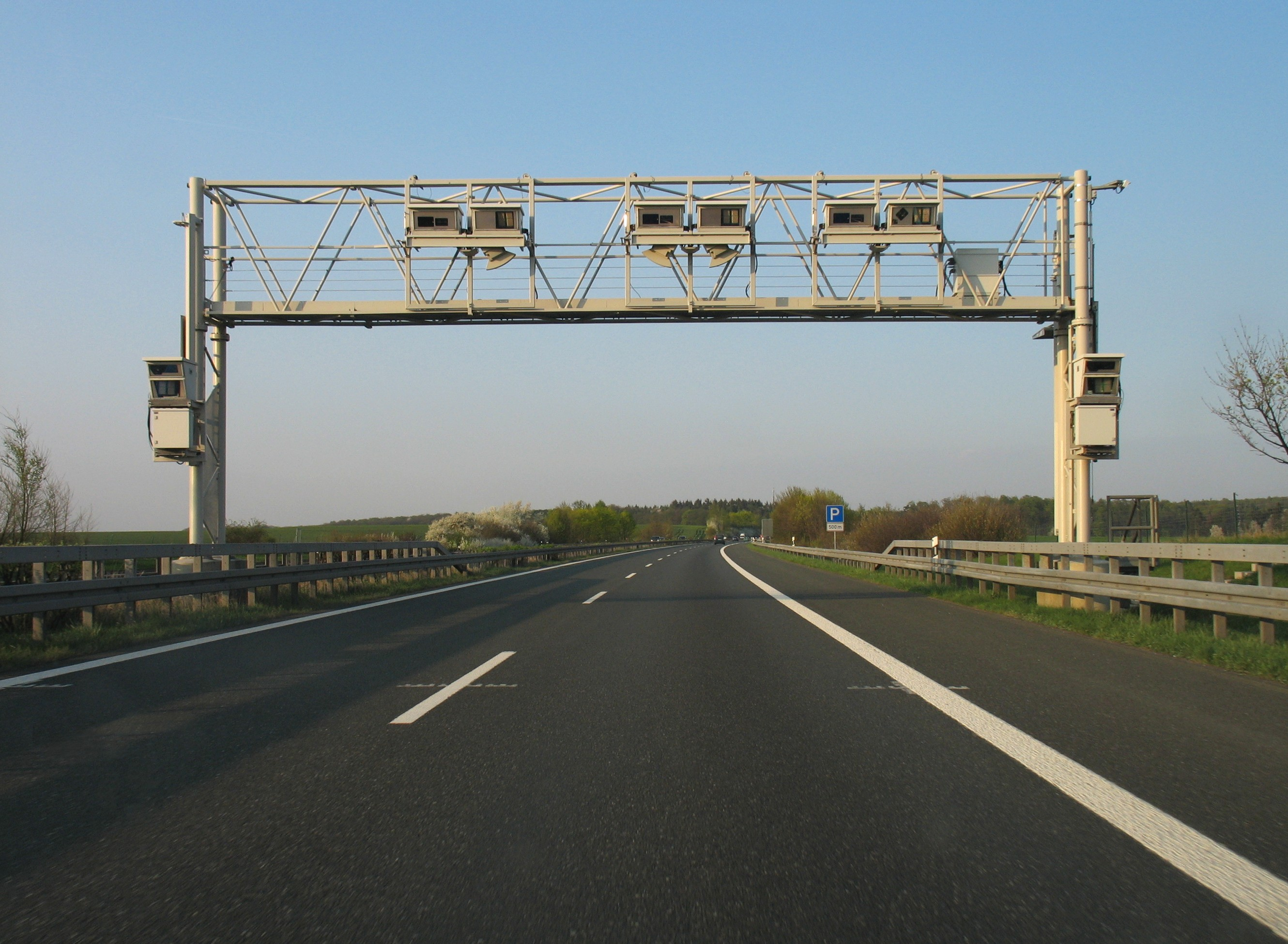
Camera gantry in Germany for toll compliance enforcement

To prevent avoidance of toll payments (e.g. by switching off the OBUs), the trucks are photographed at approximately 300 toll enforcement gantries, and checked by approximately 450 mobile checking stations. The data generated from these compliance checks are compared in the central computing system, and enforcement measured being started. The non-compliance rate is published as being consistently less than 1%.

Plans to export the specific German solution to other countries were not realized, but a number of GNSS-based tolling solutions were implemented in European countries for distance-based charging of trucks. Plans to expand the system to value-added services, such as fleet management, were not implemented.

== See also ==
- LKW-Maut
